= Luck and fate in Middle-earth =

Theme in Tolkien's fiction

The lives of the characters in J. R. R. Tolkien's world of Middle-earth appear variously to be driven by luck or by fate. This is arranged in such a way that the characters' free will is never compromised; they must rely on their own courage, just like Old English heroes like Beowulf and figures from Norse mythology. The text of The Lord of the Rings, while never Christian on the surface, hints at the working of higher powers, which the cosmology in The Silmarillion presents as the angelic or godlike Valar, who in turn carry out the will of the creator, the one God Eru Ilúvatar.

== Context ==
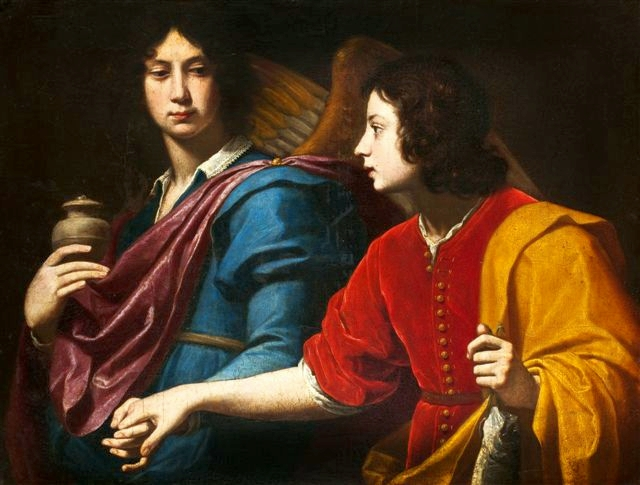
Scholars have likened the Valar to Christian angels, intermediaries between the creator and the created world. Painting by Lorenzo Lippi, c. 1645

J. R. R. Tolkien was an English author and philologist of ancient Germanic languages, specialising in Old English; he spent much of his career as a professor at the University of Oxford. He is best known for his novels about his invented Middle-earth, The Hobbit and The Lord of the Rings, and for the posthumously published The Silmarillion which provides a more mythical narrative about earlier ages. A devout Roman Catholic, he described The Lord of the Rings as "a fundamentally religious and Catholic work", rich in Christian symbolism. (Note: Carpenter 2023, letter 142 to Robert Murray, 2 December 1953) The cosmology of Middle-earth includes the Valar, who are "angelic powers" or "gods". (Note: Carpenter 2023, letter 154 to Naomi Mitchison, September 1954) They are subordinate to the one God, Eru Ilúvatar, who created the world as described in the Ainulindalë. Scholars have noted that the Valar resemble angels in Christianity, but that Tolkien presented them rather more like pagan gods, such as the Æsir in Norse mythology.

== Higher powers ==
The Episcopal priest and Tolkien scholar Fleming Rutledge writes that in The Lord of the Rings, and especially at moments like the wizard Gandalf's explanation to Frodo in "The Shadow of the Past", there are clear hints of a higher power at work in events in Middle-earth:

There was more than one power at work, Frodo. The Ring was trying to get back to its master ... Behind that there was something else at work, beyond any design of the Ring-maker. I can put it no plainer than by saying that Bilbo was meant to find the Ring, and not by its maker. In which case you also were meant to have it. [Tolkien's italics] (Note: Tolkien 1954a, book 1, ch. 2 "The Shadow of the Past")

Rutledge writes that in this way, Tolkien repeatedly hints at a higher power "that controls even the Ring itself, even the maker of the Ring himself [her italics]", and asks who or what that power might be. Her reply is that at the surface level, it means the Valar, "a race of created beings (analogous to the late-biblical angels)". At a deeper level, as both Rutledge and the Catholic philosopher Peter Kreeft write, it means "the One", Eru Ilúvatar, or in Christian terms, divine Providence.

Fleming Rutledge's analysis of levels of power in The Lord of the Rings
Level	Power	Action
In Middle-earth	The Ring; The Dark Lord Sauron	tries to "get back to its master" tries to command the Ring to return to him
In Ea's cosmology, surface level	The angelic Valar	guide events in Middle-earth
In Ea's cosmology, deeper level	"The One", Eru Ilúvatar	has a plan for everything
In Christian terms	Divine Providence	intervenes in the universe

== Luck, courage, and providence ==
And suddenly he felt the Eye ... that did not sleep. He knew that it had become aware of his gaze. A fierce eager will was there. It leaped towards him; almost like a finger he felt it, searching for him. ... He heard himself crying out: Never, never! Or was it: Verily I come, I come to you? He could not tell. Then as a flash from some other point of power there came to his mind another thought: Take it off! Take it off! Fool, take it off! Take off the Ring! The two powers strove in him ... Suddenly he was aware of himself again. Frodo, neither the Voice nor the Eye: free to choose, and with one remaining instant in which to do so. He took the Ring off his finger.

— The Lord of the Rings, book 2, ch. 10 "The Breaking of the Fellowship" (Note: Tolkien 1954a, book 2, ch. 10 "The Breaking of the Fellowship")

The Tolkien scholar Tom Shippey discusses the connection between the Valar and "luck" on Middle-earth, writing that as in real life, "People ... do in sober reality recognise a strongly patterning force in the world around them" but that while this may be due to "Providence or the Valar", the force "does not affect free will and cannot be distinguished from the ordinary operations of nature" nor reduce the necessity of "heroic endeavour". He states that this exactly matches the Old English view of luck and personal courage, as Beowulf's "wyrd often spares the man who isn't doomed, as long as his courage holds."

'Yes', said Gandalf... The Ring now has passed beyond my help... Very nearly it was revealed to the Enemy, but it escaped. I had some part in that: for I sat in a high place, and I strove with the Dark Tower; and the Shadow passed. Then I was weary, very weary; and I walked long in dark thought.'

— The Lord of the Rings, book 3, ch. 5 "The White Rider" (Note: Tolkien 1954, book 3, ch. 5 "The White Rider")

In addition, the leapfrogging of the timeline by the multiple interlaced story threads in The Lord of the Rings allows Tolkien to make hidden connections that can only be grasped retrospectively, as the reader realises on reflection that certain events happened at the same time. Shippey gives as an instance the moment when Frodo sits on Amon Hen, the Seat of Seeing, puts on the One Ring, and feels the Eye of Sauron pressing towards him; at the same time, Frodo hears a voice urging him to take the Ring off, giving him just enough time to make up his mind and save the quest by complying. Interlace, West notes, can "show purpose or pattern behind change". This can appear, Shippey writes, as luck, where in daily life it is uncertain whether this is "something completely humdrum and practical or something mysterious and supernatural", just like wyrd. In this case, the reader has to wait from book 2, chapter 10 ("The Breaking of the Fellowship") (Note: Tolkien 1954a, book 2, ch. 10 "The Breaking of the Fellowship") until book 3, chapter 5 ("The White Rider") for Gandalf to reveal that the voice that Frodo heard was his. (Note: Tolkien 1954, book 3, ch. 5 "The White Rider")

The scholar of humanities Paul H. Kocher similarly discusses the role of providence, in the form of the intentions of the Valar or of the creator, in Bilbo's finding of the One Ring and Frodo's bearing of it; as Gandalf says, they were "meant" to have it, though it remained their choice to co-operate with this purpose.

== Free will and fate ==
The literary critic Colin Manlove criticised Tolkien's attitude on free will, stating that Tolkien had ended free will and heroism "by cancelling them with luck" and his story made mortals "into puppets".

The medievalist Elizabeth Solopova comments that the monster Gollum has an important part to play, providing in her view the clearest testament to the role of fate in The Lord of the Rings. Beyond Gandalf's words, the story is structured in such a way that past decisions have a critical influence on current events. For instance, because Bilbo and Frodo spare Gollum, Gollum is able to destroy the Ring by falling into the Cracks of Doom while Frodo fails to destroy it. Frodo, who is overpowered by the evil of the Ring, is saved by what seems to be luck. The role of fate in The Lord of the Rings is contrasted sharply with the prominent role that Tolkien gives to personal choice and will. Frodo's voluntary choice to bear the Ring to Mordor is central to the plot of the whole story. Also important is Frodo's willing offer of the Ring to Gandalf, the hero Aragorn, and the Elf-lady Galadriel, and their conscious refusal of it, not to mention Frodo's final inability to summon the will to destroy it. Thus, both free will and fate play out throughout the story: from Sam's vision of old Gaffer Gamgee's wheelbarrow and the Scouring of the Shire in the Mirror of Galadriel, to Arwen Evenstar's choice of mortality.

Elizabeth Solopova's analysis of fateful action
Perceived event/chain of causation
Superficial explanation
Deeper explanation
Gollum slipped
Accident, luck
—————

Frodo spared Gollum's life
▶ Gollum was able to intervene when Frodo failed
▶ Gollum slipped
▶ Ring was destroyed, Quest succeeded

—————
Free will and fate

The Tolkien scholar Helen Lasseter Freeh notes that the longer version of the tale of Túrin Turambar in Unfinished Tales (the Narn i Hîn Húrin (Note: Tolkien 1980, Part One: Narn i Hîn Húrin)) contains a dialogue between the Dark Lord Morgoth, who is a fallen Vala, and the heroic but mortal Man Húrin about fate and providence. Despite his imprisonment, Húrin insists that Morgoth cannot control everything, and while Morgoth does not directly contradict this, he says he will spread a "cloud of Doom" on everyone Húrin loves, and "wherever they go, evil shall arise". Túrin lives a life of disaster, in which Freeh sees the hand of fate, which threatens to overwhelm Túrin's free will. Shippey comments that Morgoth is one of the Valar, whose power in the world appears as luck, or chance, or fate. Terrible things in the Narn seem to be coincidences; but, writes Shippey, Tolkien often gives double explanations of these events, one fate, one just accident.

== Proverbs and providence ==
Shippey writes that the numerous proverbs in The Lord of the Rings lend weight to the subtle implications of the text's interlaced structure, which for much of the time leaves the reader, like the characters, unaware of what else is going on in Middle-earth. While the real-world proverbs are broadly neutral, although some remain optimistic or gloomy, the invented proverbs are, he suggests, closer to Tolkien's thought. So Théoden's "Oft evil will shall evil mar", Aragorn's "The hasty stroke goes oft astray", or Gandalf's "A traitor may betray himself", all contribute to Tolkien's portrayal of what he believed was the character of reality. The implied message is that what appears as luck to the protagonists is indeed a higher purpose, and that all can work out well. But all the same, they must keep up their courage, and ignore, as Frodo and Sam do, "their bewilderments, infatuations, [and their] sense of being lost and abandoned". The scholar of literature Randel Helms writes that the "significance" of the destruction of Saruman's realm of Isengard is summarized by a pair of similar proverbs, Théoden's maxim, and Gandalf's "Often does hatred hurt itself"; the action of the Ents taking revenge on Saruman then shows just how providential control and cause-and-effect morality work out in practice.

== Sources ==
- Carpenter, Humphrey (1977). J. R. R. Tolkien: A Biography. New York: Ballantine Books. ISBN 978-0-04-928037-3.
- Carpenter, Humphrey, ed. (2023) [1981]. The Letters of J. R. R. Tolkien: Revised and Expanded Edition. New York: HarperCollins. ISBN 978-0-35-865298-4.
- Dickerson, Matthew (2013) [2007]. "Valar". In Drout, Michael D. C. (ed.). The J. R. R. Tolkien Encyclopedia. Routledge. pp. 689–690. ISBN 978-0-415-86511-1.
- Helms, Randel (1971). "The Structure and Aesthetic of Tolkien's Lord of the Rings". Mythcon Proceedings. 1 (2). Article 2.
- Kocher, Paul (1974) [1972]. Master of Middle-earth: The Achievement of J.R.R. Tolkien. Penguin Books. ISBN 0140038779.
- Kreeft, Peter J. (November 2005). "The Presence of Christ in The Lord of the Rings". Ignatius Insight. Archived from the original on 24 November 2005.
- Rutledge, Fleming (2004). The Battle for Middle-earth: Tolkien's Divine Design in The Lord of the Rings. William B. Eerdmans Publishing Company. ISBN 978-0-80282-497-4.
- Shippey, Tom (2005) [1982]. The Road to Middle-Earth: How J. R. R. Tolkien Created a New Mythology (Third ed.). HarperCollins. ISBN 978-0-261-10275-0.
- Solopova, Elizabeth (2009). Languages, Myths and History: An Introduction to the Linguistic and Literary Background of J. R. R. Tolkien's Fiction. New York City: North Landing Books. ISBN 978-0-9816607-1-4.
- Spacks, Patricia Meyer (2005). "Power and Meaning in 'The Lord of the Rings'". In Isaacs, Neil David; Zimbardo, Rose A. (eds.). Understanding The Lord of the Rings: The Best of Tolkien Criticism. Houghton Mifflin. pp. 58–64. ISBN 978-0-618-42253-1.
- Tolkien, J. R. R. (1954a). The Fellowship of the Ring. The Lord of the Rings. Boston: Houghton Mifflin. OCLC 9552942.
- Tolkien, J. R. R. (1954). The Two Towers. The Lord of the Rings. Boston: Houghton Mifflin. OCLC 1042159111.
- Tolkien, J. R. R. (1980). Christopher Tolkien (ed.). Unfinished Tales. Boston: Houghton Mifflin. ISBN 978-0-395-29917-3.
- West, Richard C. (1975). "The Interlace Structure of The Lord of the Rings". In Jared Lobdell (ed.). A Tolkien Compass. Open Court. pp. 77–94. ISBN 0-87548-303-8.
- Wood, Ralph C. (2003). The Gospel According to Tolkien. Westminster John Knox Press. ISBN 978-0-664-23466-9.
- Wood, Ralph C. (2015). "2. On Fate, Providence, and Free Will in 'The Silmarillion'". Tolkien among the Moderns. University of Notre Dame Press. pp. 65–75. ISBN 978-0-268-09674-8.
