= Literary devices in The Lord of the Rings =

Literary techniques in Tolkien's work

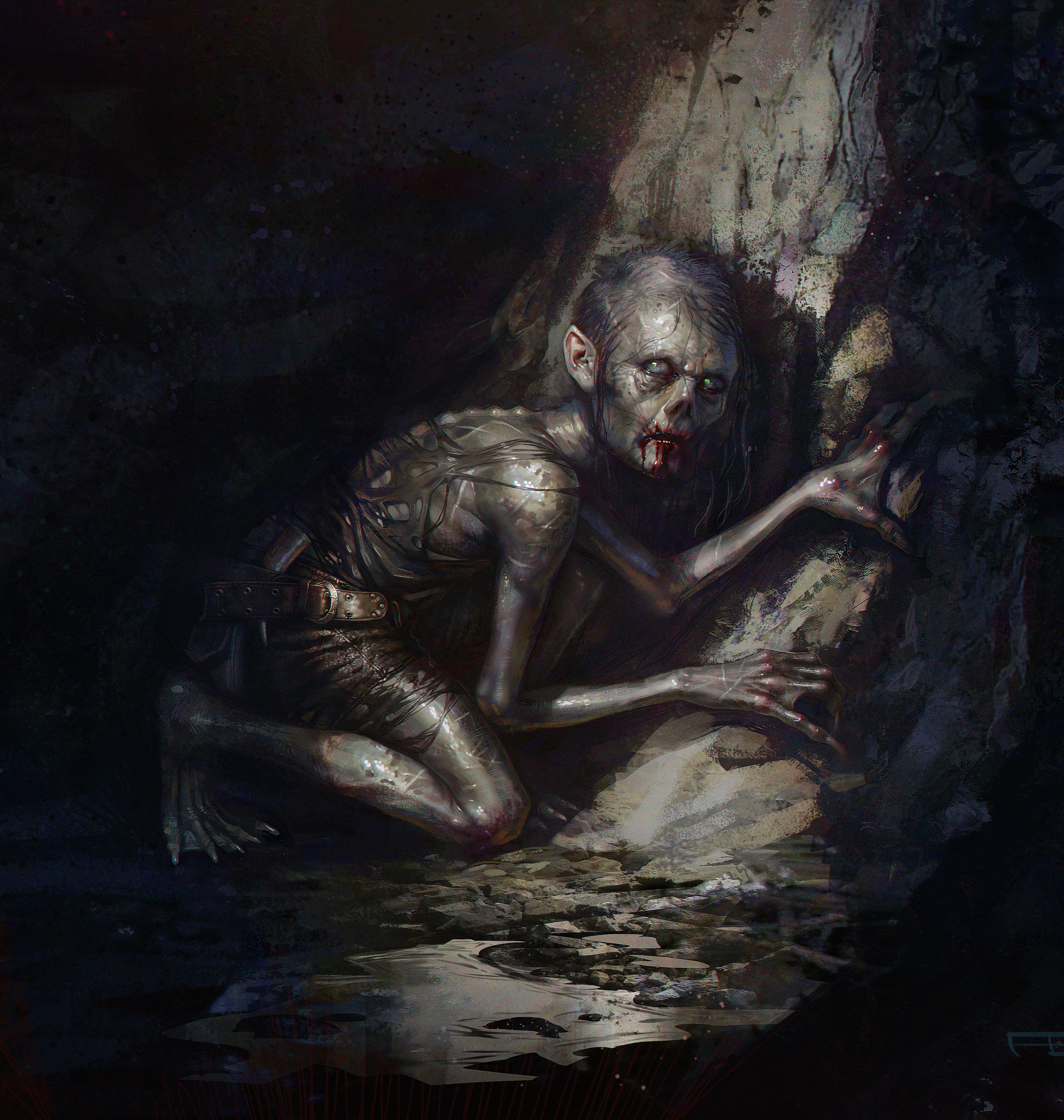
The scholar Brian Rosebury considers Tolkien's narrative portrayal of Gollum (pictured) his most memorable success.

The philologist and fantasy author J. R. R. Tolkien made use of multiple literary devices in The Lord of the Rings, from its narrative structure and its use of pseudotranslation and editorial framing, to character pairing and the deliberate cultivation of an impression of depth while constructing the novel. The narrative structure in particular has been seen as a pair of quests, a sequence of tableaux (static scenes), a complex edifice, multiple spirals, and a medieval-style interlacing. The first volume, The Fellowship of the Ring, on the other hand, has a single narrative thread, and repeated episodes of danger and recuperation in five "Homely Houses". His prose style, too, has been both criticised and defended.

== Context ==
J. R. R. Tolkien (1892–1973) was an English Roman Catholic writer, poet, philologist, and academic, best known as the author of the high fantasy works The Hobbit and The Lord of the Rings.

The Lord of the Rings was published in 1954–55; it was awarded the International Fantasy Award in 1957. The publication of the Ace Books and Ballantine Books paperbacks in the United States helped it to become immensely popular with a new generation in the 1960s. The book has remained so ever since, ranking as one of the most popular works of fiction of the twentieth century, judged by both sales and reader surveys. In the 2003 "Big Read" survey conducted by the BBC in the United Kingdom, The Lord of the Rings was found to be the "Nation's best-loved book." In similar 2004 polls, both Germany and Australia also found The Lord of the Rings to be their favourite book. In a 1999 poll of Amazon.com customers, The Lord of the Rings was judged to be their favourite "book of the millennium." The popularity of The Lord of the Rings increased further when Peter Jackson's film trilogy came out in 2001–2003.

== Narrative structure ==
=== The Fellowship of the Ring ===
The first volume, The Fellowship of the Ring, has a different structure from the rest of the novel. It has attracted attention both for its sequence of five "Homely Houses", safe places where the Hobbit protagonists may recuperate after a dangerous episode, and for its arrangement as a single narrative thread focused on its protagonist, Frodo, interrupted by two long but critically important flashback narrative chapters, "The Shadow of the Past" and "The Council of Elrond".

Tolkien's descriptions of Frodo's five "Homely Houses", (house icons) alternating with places of danger (swords icons), form a repetitive structure for the first part of The Fellowship of the Ring.

=== The work as a whole ===
Scholars have described the narrative structure of The Lord of the Rings in a variety of ways, including as a balanced pair of outer and inner quests; a linear sequence of scenes or tableaux; a fractal arrangement of separate episodes; a Gothic cathedral-like edifice of many different elements; multiple cycles or spirals; or an elaborate medieval-style interlacing of intersecting threads of story. Also present is an elaborate symmetry between pairs of characters.

Diagram of Brian Rosebury's analysis of The Lord of the Rings as a combined quest (to destroy the Ring) and journey (as a series of Tableaux of places in Middle-earth); the two support each other, and must interlock tightly to do so.

=== Interlacing ===
The narrative interlacing in The Lord of the Rings, also called by the French term entrelacement, is an unusual and complex narrative structure, known from medieval literature, that enabled Tolkien to achieve a variety of literary effects. These include maintaining suspense, keeping the reader uncertain of what will happen and even of what is happening to other characters at the same time in the story; creating surprise and an ongoing feeling of bewilderment and disorientation. More subtly, the leapfrogging of the timeline in The Lord of the Rings by the different story threads allows Tolkien to make hidden connections that can only be grasped retrospectively, as the reader realises on reflection that certain events happened at the same time, and that these connections imply a contest of good and evil powers.

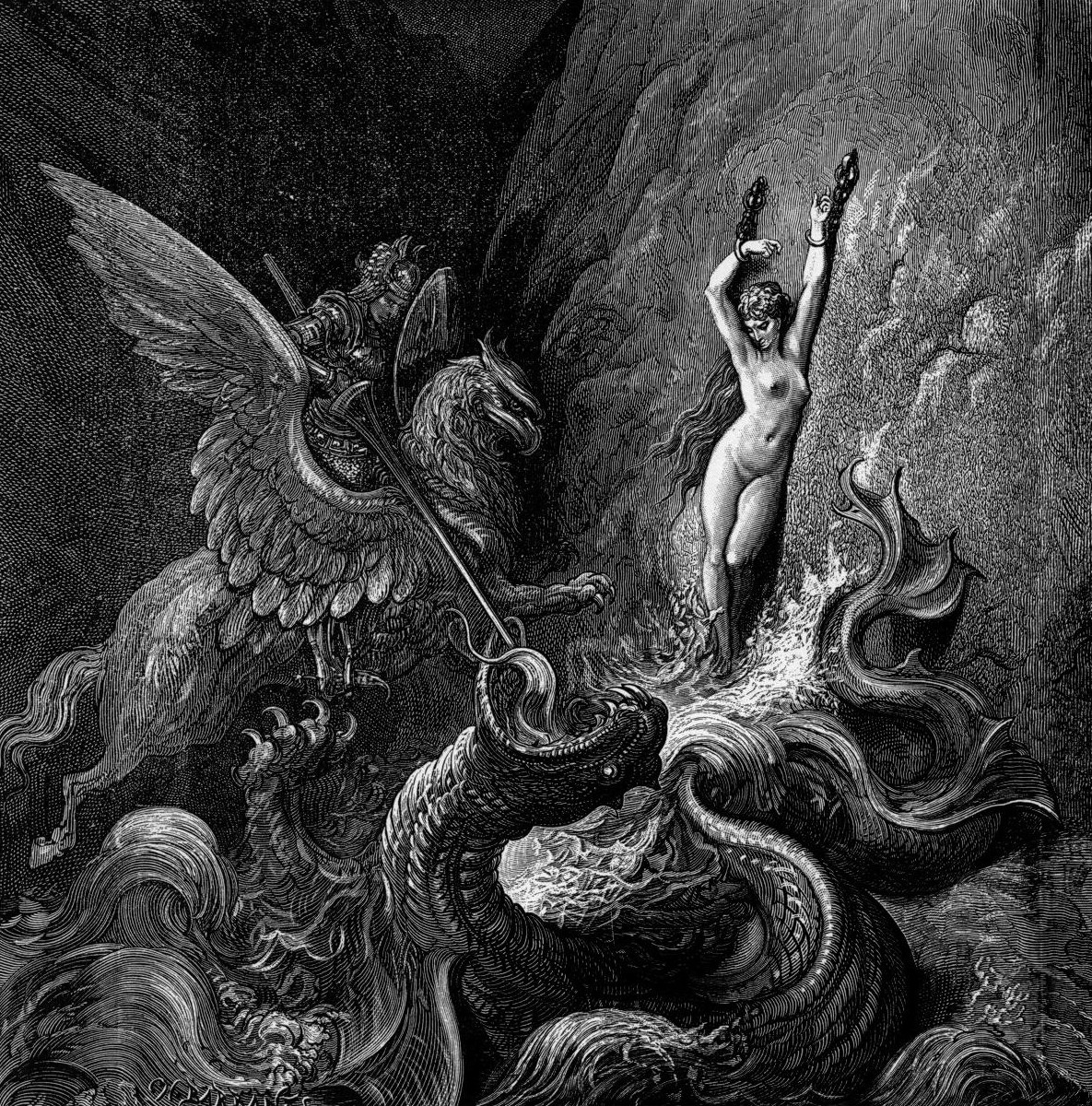
Tolkien disliked the French and Italian interlaced romances, like Orlando Furioso, but used their technique anyway. Illustration of Ruggiero rescuing Angelica for Orlando Furioso by Gustave Doré, 19th century

The Tolkien scholar Tom Shippey comments that it is curious that Tolkien used this literary device, as he favoured "northern" literature over French or later Italian epics like Ariosto's Orlando Furioso. All the same, Shippey writes, Tolkien's use of the technique is far more tightly structured than that of the Medieval romances.

== Character pairing ==
Tolkien used character pairing to express some of the moral complexity of his major characters in The Lord of the Rings. Commentators have noted that the format of a fantasy does not lend itself to subtlety of characterisation, but that pairing allows inner tensions to be expressed as linked opposites, including, in a psychoanalytic interpretation, those of Jungian archetypes. Major pairings include those between the Hobbits Frodo, Sam, and Gollum, the three of them linked by the Ring, by friendship, and by bonds of loyalty and of oath. This enables Tolkien to portray the good and evil sides of Frodo's character. The unheroic Frodo is further contrasted with the plainly heroic Aragorn. Among the kingly figures, the unhappy Steward of Gondor, Denethor, is paired both with the future king Aragorn and with the bold king of Rohan, Théoden. Pairings operate, too, among supporting characters, such as that between the elf-queen Galadriel and the giant spider Shelob, light opposing darkness. Patrick Grant, a scholar of Renaissance literature, interpreted the interactions of the characters as fitting the oppositions and other pairwise relationships of Jungian archetypes, recurring psychological symbols proposed by Carl Jung.

Diagram of Patrick Grant's Jungian view of The Lord of the Rings with hero, anima and other archetypes

== Impression of depth ==
Tolkien deliberately sought to create the aesthetic effect of impression of depth in The Lord of the Rings. It was intended to give the reader the feeling that the work had "deep roots in the past", and hence that it was attractively authentic. The effect was constructed on at least four factors, namely the enormous scale of The Lord of the Rings and the amount of background detail, including maps and genealogies; the apparently casual and incomplete mentions of this background; multiple inconsistent accounts, as in real history; and writing different texts in varying styles. Scholars have noted some of Tolkien's medieval antecedents in the effect, such as Beowulf and Sir Gawain and the Green Knight, books which he had studied and translated. Fantasy authors such as Ursula K. Le Guin and J. K. Rowling have to an extent followed Tolkien in using the technique.

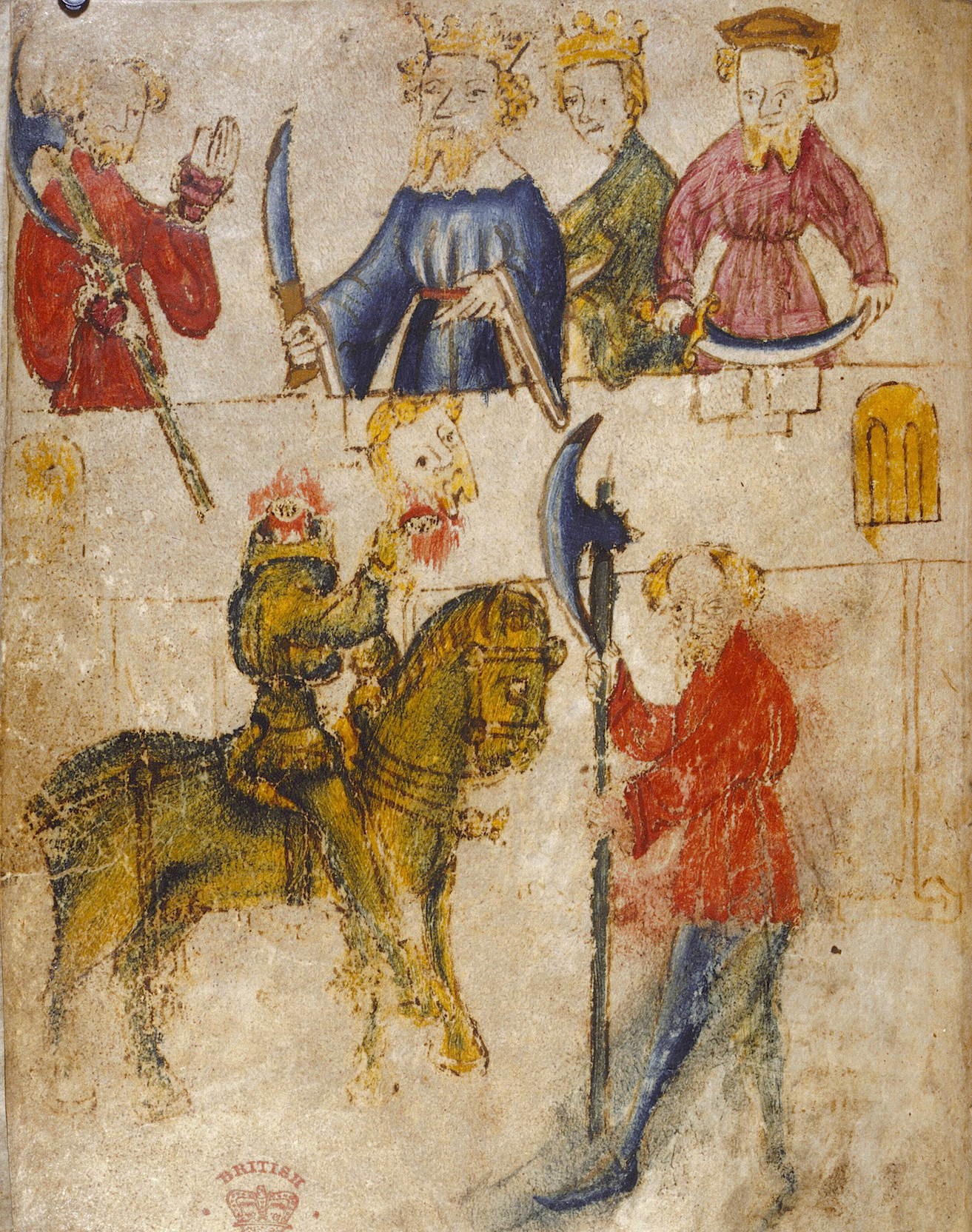
Tolkien admired the impression of depth in Sir Gawain and the Green Knight. Illustration from the medieval manuscript

== Prose style ==
Tolkien's prose style in The Lord of the Rings is remarkably varied and "invitational" to the reader. Commentators have noted that Tolkien selected linguistic registers to suit different peoples, such as simple and modern for Hobbits and more archaic for Dwarves, Elves, and Riders of Rohan. This allowed him to use the Hobbits to mediate between the modern reader and the heroic and archaic realm of fantasy. The Orcs, too, are depicted in different voices: the Orc-leader Grishnákh speaks in bullying tones, while the minor functionary Gorbag uses grumbling modern speech.

Brian Rosebury considers Tolkien's portrayal of Gollum his "most memorable success", sharply defining him with an "extraordinary idiolect", a unique way of speaking. This encompasses "obsessive repetition", "undeveloped syntax and unstable sense of grammatical person, sufficient to imply dissociative mental illness. The language is, Rosebury suggests, partly modelled on "the playful, wheedling, sentimental argot of the nursery" with its frequent use of "nice" and "nasty" and phrases like "little hobbitses". He comments that the effect is to depict Gollum as morally deformed "like ... an unregenerate child grown old, in whom the unattractive infant qualities of selfishness, cruelty and self-pitying are monstrously preserved and isolated."

Tolkien's prose style was attacked by scholars of literature such as Catharine R. Stimpson and Burton Raffel in the 20th century. Raffel criticised the work's style, the embedded poetry, the characterisation, what he called the "manipulatory" use of incident, and the implied Christian morality. It has more recently been analysed more favourably, both by other novelists such as Ursula Le Guin, and by scholars such as Rosebury and Shippey. Where Stimpson called Tolkien's diction needlessly complex, Rosebury argues that even in the example she chose, Tolkien was as plain and simple as Ernest Hemingway. He analyses a passage where Merry has just helped to kill the Witch-King. Tolkien begins this in plain language, modulating into a higher register to deal with the echoes of ancient and magical history. More recently, scholars have applied corpus linguistics to analyse his text quantitatively.

== Pseudotranslation and editorial framing ==
A pseudotranslation is a text written as if it had been translated from a foreign language. Tolkien used it in The Lord of the Rings for two reasons: to help resolve the linguistic puzzle he had accidentally created by using real-world languages within his legendarium, and to lend realism by supporting a found manuscript conceit to frame his story.

Effectively, Tolkien pretends to be an editor who has received an ancient manuscript, the Red Book of Westmarch, written in Westron, the Common Speech of Middle-earth, annotated and edited by many hands, which he undertakes to translate into English. The manuscript supposedly contains names and words from other languages, some of them related to Westron; he pretends he has translated those into languages related to English, namely Old English and Old Norse.

Tolkien then goes much further, constructing an elaborate editorial framing of the entire book, constructing a prologue and multiple appendices that all collude to support the found manuscript conceit, and indeed to construct a secondary world that appears real and solid because of the interlocking evidence from many different technical points of view. These include genealogies, ancient annals complete with scribal footnotes and editorial comments, even a discussion "On Translation" about how it has proven best to handle the complexities of the translation into modern English.

== See also ==
- Non-narrative elements in The Lord of the Rings

== Sources ==
- Attebery, Brian (2012). James, Edward; Mendlesohn, Farah (eds.). The Cambridge Companion to Fantasy Literature. Cambridge University Press. ISBN 978-1-107-49373-5.
- Bettridge, William Edwin (1990). "Tolkien's "New" Mythology". Mythlore. 16 (4). Article 5.
- Birns, Nicholas (2012). "'You Have Grown Very Much': The Scouring of the Shire and the Novelistic Aspects of The Lord of the Rings". Journal of the Fantastic in the Arts. 23 (1): 82–101. JSTOR 24353144.
- Brljak, Vladimir (2010). "The Books of Lost Tales: Tolkien as Metafictionist". Tolkien Studies. 7 (1): 1–34. doi:10.1353/tks.0.0079. ISSN 1547-3163.
- Brooke-Rose, Christine (1981). A Rhetoric of the Unreal. Cambridge University Press. ISBN 978-0-5212-2561-8. OCLC 7197513.
- Burns, Marjorie (2005). Perilous Realms: Celtic and Norse in Tolkien's Middle-earth. University of Toronto Press. ISBN 978-0-8020-3806-7.
- Chance, Jane (1980) [1979]. Tolkien's Art: 'A Mythology for England'. Papermac. ISBN 978-0-333-29034-7.
- Carpenter, Humphrey, ed. (2023) [1981]. The Letters of J. R. R. Tolkien: Revised and Expanded Edition. New York: HarperCollins. ISBN 978-0-35-865298-4.
- Caughey, Anna (2020) [2014]. "The Hero's Journey". In Lee, Stuart D. (ed.). A Companion to J. R. R. Tolkien. Wiley Blackwell. pp. 404–417. ISBN 978-1-1196-5602-9. OCLC 1183854105.
- Curry, Patrick (2020) [2014]. "The Critical Response to Tolkien's Fiction" (PDF). In Lee, Stuart D. (ed.). A Companion to J. R. R. Tolkien. Wiley Blackwell. ISBN 978-1-11965-602-9.
- Drout, Michael D. C.; Hitotsubashi, Namiko; Scavera, Rachel (2014). "Tolkien's Creation of the Impression of Depth". Tolkien Studies. 11 (1): 167–211. doi:10.1353/tks.2014.0008. ISSN 1547-3163. S2CID 170851865.
- Flieger, Verlyn (2001) [1997]. A Question of Time: J.R.R. Tolkien's Road to Faërie. Kent State University Press. ISBN 978-0-87338-699-9.
- Flieger, Verlyn (2005). Interrupted Music: The Making of Tolkien's Mythology. Kent State University Press.
- Grant, Patrick (1973). "Tolkien: Archetype and Word". Cross Currents (Winter 1973): 365–380. Archived from the original on 3 December 2021.
- Kullmann, Thomas; Siepmann, Dirk (2021). Tolkien as a Literary Artist. Cham: Palgrave Macmillan. ISBN 978-3-030-69298-8.
- Le Guin, Ursula (2001). "Rhythmic Pattern in The Lord of the Rings". In Haber, Karen (ed.). Meditations on Middle-earth. Simon & Schuster. pp. 101–116. ISBN 978-0743468749.
- Miller, David M. (1975). "Narrative Pattern in The Fellowship of the Ring". In Lobdell, Jared (ed.). A Tolkien Compass (First ed.). Open Court. pp. 95–106. ISBN 0-87548-303-8.
- Raffel, Burton (1968). "The Lord of the Rings as literature". In Isaacs, Neil D.; Zimbardo, Rose A. (eds.). Tolkien and the Critics. University of Notre Dame Press. pp. 218–246.
- Risden, E. L. (2011). "Tolkien's Resistance to Linearity: Narrating The Lord of the Rings in Fiction and Film". In Bogstad, Janice M.; Kaveny, Philip E. (eds.). Picturing Tolkien: Essays on Peter Jackson's 'The Lord of the Rings' Film Trilogy. McFarland. pp. 70–83. ISBN 978-0-7864-8473-7.
- Rosebury, Brian (2003) [1992]. Tolkien : A Cultural Phenomenon. Palgrave. ISBN 978-1403-91263-3.
- Sas, Katherine (2019). "A Sense of Darker Perspective: How the Marauders Convey Tolkien's 'Impression of Depth' in Harry Potter and the Prisoner of Azkaban". Mythlore. 38 (1). Article 9.
- Shippey, Tom (2001). J. R. R. Tolkien: Author of the Century. HarperCollins. ISBN 978-0261-10401-3.
- Shippey, Tom (2005) [1982]. The Road to Middle-Earth: How J. R. R. Tolkien Created a New Mythology (Third ed.). HarperCollins. ISBN 978-0-261-10275-0.
- Solopova, Elizabeth (2009). Languages, Myths and History: An Introduction to the Linguistic and Literary Background of J. R. R. Tolkien's Fiction. New York City: North Landing Books. ISBN 978-0-9816607-1-4.
- Stimpson, Catharine (1969). J.R.R. Tolkien. Columbia University Press. p. 29. ISBN 978-0-231-03207-0. OCLC 24122.
- Turner, Allan (2007). "Language, Theories of: Translation". In Drout, Michael D. C. (ed.). J.R.R. Tolkien Encyclopedia. Routledge. pp. 328–330. ISBN 978-1-135-88033-0.
- Turner, Allan (2011a). "A Theoretical Model for Tolkien Translation Criticism". In Honegger, Thomas (ed.). Tolkien in Translation. Cormarë series. Vol. 4. Zurich: Walking Tree Publishers. pp. 1–30. ISBN 978-3-9521424-6-2.
- Tolkien, J. R. R. (1983). The Monsters and the Critics, and Other Essays. London: Allen & Unwin. OCLC 417591085.
- Walker, Steve (2009). The Power of Tolkien's Prose: Middle-Earth's Magical Style. New York: Palgrave Macmillan. ISBN 978-0-230-61992-0.
- West, Richard C. (1975). "The Interlace Structure of The Lord of the Rings". In Jared Lobdell (ed.). A Tolkien Compass. Open Court. pp. 77–94. ISBN 0-87548-303-8.
