= Addiction to power in The Lord of the Rings =

Theme in Tolkien's fantasy

The theme of addiction to power in The Lord of the Rings is central, as the Ring, made by the Dark Lord Sauron to enable him to take over the whole of Middle-earth, progressively corrupts the mind of its owner to use the Ring for evil.

The corrupting power of the Ring has been compared to the Ring of Gyges in Plato's Republic, which gave the power of invisibility and so tempted its owner, but there is no evidence that Tolkien modelled The Lord of the Rings on that story. Scholars such as Tom Shippey consider the theme to be modern, since in earlier times, power was considered to reveal character, not to alter it, recalling the English politician Lord Acton's 1887 statement that "power tends to corrupt, and absolute power corrupts absolutely".

The corrupting effect of power in the book is not limited to the Ring. Sauron was already corrupted when he chose to put much of his power into the Ring to gain further control of Middle-earth. Some other characters, like Tom Bombadil, are of an earlier time, and are unaffected by the Ring; the giant spider Shelob is unquestionably evil but uninterested in the Ring. The Wizard Saruman turns to evil and is wholly corrupted, lured by pride and power, but never gets the Ring.

Tolkien uses the Ring to illuminate the moral choices made by each character. Sméagol kills his friend Déagol to gain the Ring, and is corrupted by it, becoming wholly miserable as the creature Gollum. The virtuous warrior Boromir is seduced by the idea of using the Ring for good, and dies as a result. The Elf-lady Galadriel is greatly tempted, but rejects all use of the Ring. The Hobbit Frodo Baggins contends bravely with the Ring but is taken over by it, whereas his companion Samwise Gamgee is saved by his love for Frodo, and his simple good sense.

== The Ring and power ==
=== In the narrative ===
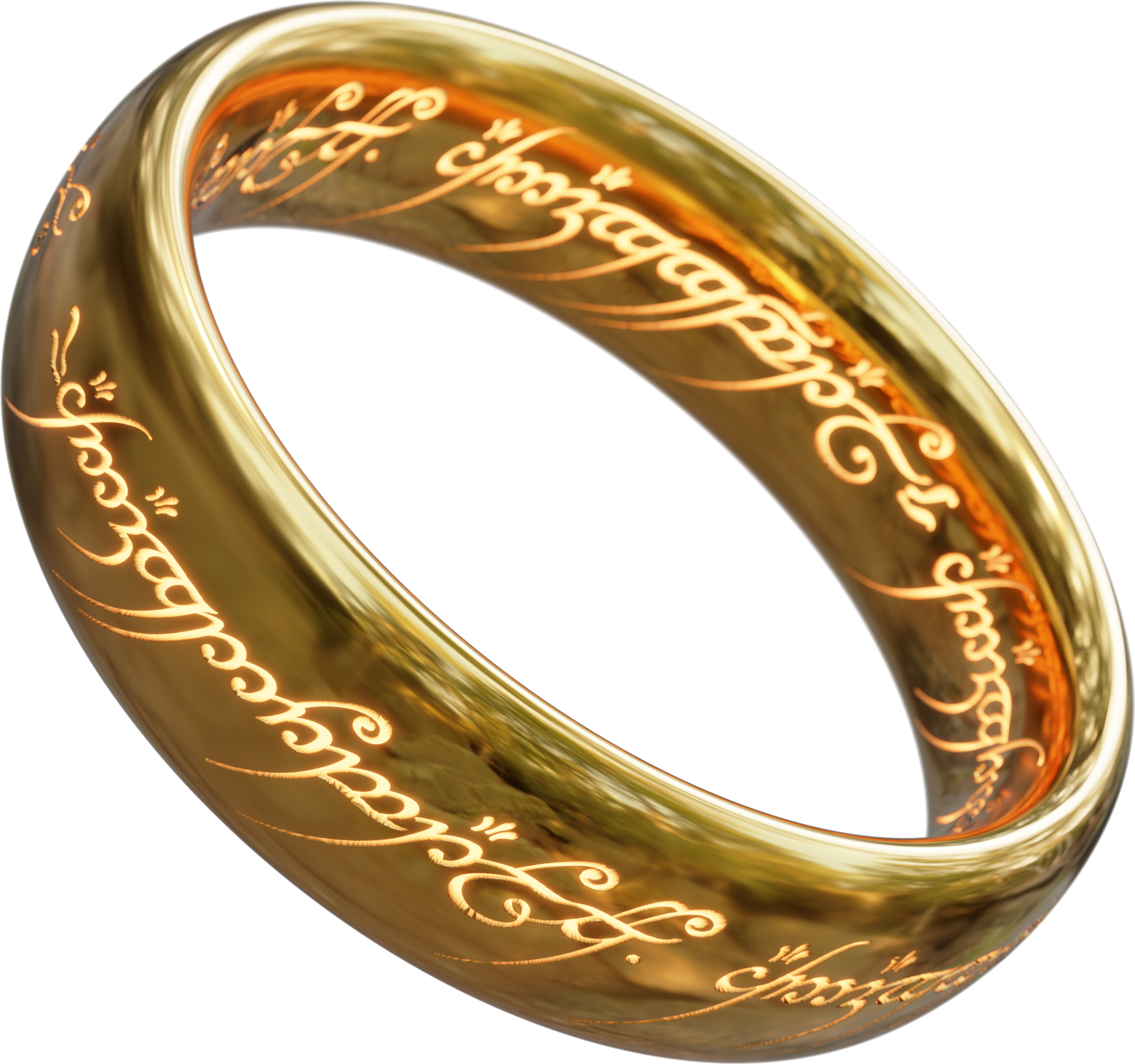
Artist's representation of the One Ring

In J. R. R. Tolkien's fantasy work The Lord of the Rings, the One Ring was forged by the Dark Lord Sauron in the fires of Mount Doom during the Second Age to gain dominion over peoples of Middle-earth. (Note: Tolkien 1954, book 1, ch. 2 "The Shadow of the Past") He intended it to control those who wore any of the other Rings of Power. Since they were powerful, he had to put much of his own power as a Maia, a supernatural being, into the Ring to achieve this. (Note: Tolkien 1977, "Of the Rings of Power and the Third Age")

When the Stoorish Hobbit Sméagol saw the Ring that his friend Déagol had found in the River Anduin, he killed Déagol to get it, and used the Ring's power of invisibility:

to find out secrets, and he put his knowledge to crooked and malicious uses. He became sharp-eyed and keen-eared for all that was hurtful. The ring had given him power according to his stature. ... he became very unpopular and ... they called him Gollum.

The wizard Gandalf explains that Gollum was wholly corrupted by and addicted to the Ring:

"He hated it and loved it, as he hated and loved himself. He could not get rid of it. He had no will left in the matter."

=== The Ring's effects ===
A major theme is the corrupting influence of the Ring through the power it offers, especially to those already powerful. The Tolkien scholar Tom Shippey notes Gandalf's statements about the power and influence of the One Ring in "The Shadow of the Past", and the corrupting influence it has on its bearers. Gandalf rejects the Ring for this reason when Frodo offers it to him; this view of the Ring is reinforced as Elrond, Galadriel, Aragorn, and Faramir in their turn also reject it, fearing that it would overpower them as well. Inversely, the hobbits' good-naturedness and lack of ambition makes them less susceptible to the Ring's promises of power, as in Frodo and Samwise Gamgee, who are able to handle the Ring for extended periods of time. Hobbits are not totally immune to the Ring's effects, however, as shown by the changes it works in Frodo, Bilbo and Gollum. On the other hand, Boromir becomes obsessed with the Ring, but never possesses it, while Sméagol kills his kin Déagol, the first Ring bearer after Isildur, to obtain it.

Gollum and Saruman differ from the other characters in submitting willingly to an evil power; the effect, according to the scholar Patricia Spacks, is of gradual destruction, even when the character starts out mainly virtuous. Saruman's case shows, she writes, that "pride and the lust for power", as he strives to get the Ring and to be powerful like Sauron, are enough to destroy him even though he never gets the Ring. When Gandalf comes to the ruins of Isengard to meet Saruman, and offers him freedom in place of slavery to Sauron, Saruman is too thoroughly corrupted to be able to choose any longer. As for Gollum, he is "a far more pitiable creature" as the Ring has taken him from a basically amoral position to one of evil. When Frodo suggests Gollum is not totally evil, Faramir replies "Not wholly, perhaps, but malice eats it like a canker, and the evil is growing".

=== Tolkien vs Plato ===
The theme of a corrupting ring dates back to Plato's Republic, where the Ring of Gyges gave invisibility and thus the ability to get away with crime. The philosopher Eric Katz, however writes that "Plato argues that such [moral] corruption will occur, but Tolkien shows us this corruption through the thoughts and actions of his characters"; Plato tries to counter the "cynical conclusion" that moral life is chosen by the weak; Glaucon thinks that people are only "good" because they suppose they will be caught if they are not. Plato argues that immoral life is no good as it corrupts one's soul. So, Katz states, according to Plato a moral person has peace and happiness, and would not use a Ring of Power. Katz writes that Tolkien's story "demonstrate[s] various responses to the question posed by Plato: would a just person be corrupted by the possibility of almost unlimited power?" The question is answered in different ways: Gollum is weak, corrupted, and finally destroyed; Boromir begins virtuous but like Plato's Gyges is corrupted "by the temptation of power" from the Ring, even if he wants to use it for good, but redeems himself by defending the hobbits to his own death; the "strong and virtuous" Galadriel, who sees clearly what she would become if she accepted the ring, and rejects it; the immortal Tom Bombadil, exempt from the Ring's corrupting power and from its gift of invisibility; Sam who in a moment of need faithfully uses the ring, but is not seduced by its vision of "Samwise the Strong, Hero of the Age"; and finally Frodo who is gradually corrupted, but is saved by his earlier mercy to Gollum, and Gollum's desperation for the Ring. Katz concludes that Tolkien's answer to Plato's "Why be moral?" is "to be yourself".

== Addiction ==
=== "Power corrupts" ===
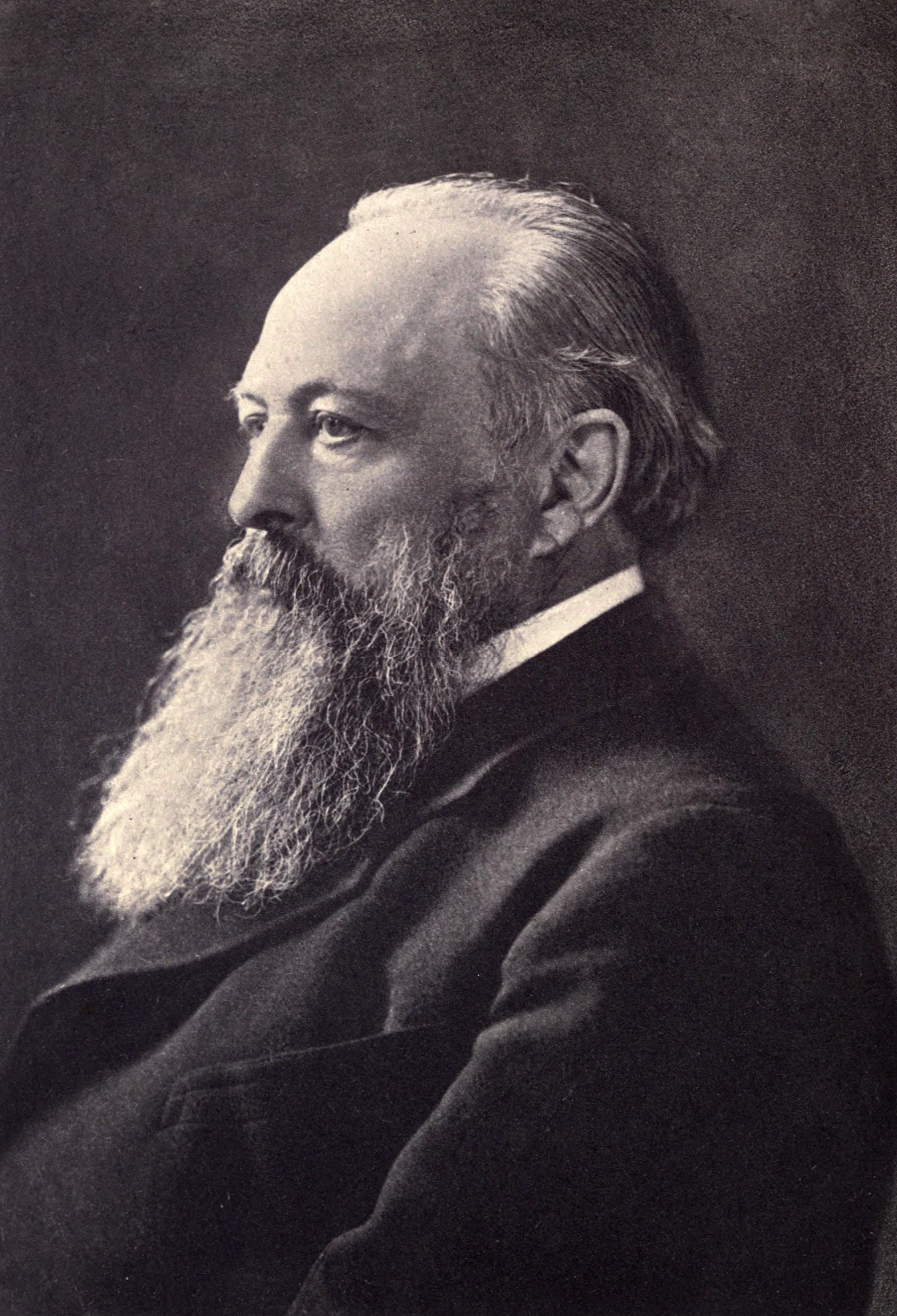
Lord Acton famously stated "Power tends to corrupt, and absolute power corrupts absolutely", an idea embodied in the addictive power of the One Ring.

The corrupting effect of power is, according to Shippey, a modern theme, since in earlier times, power was considered to "reveal character", not alter it. Shippey quotes Lord Acton's 1887 statement:

Power tends to corrupt, and absolute power corrupts absolutely. Great men are almost always bad men

Shippey points out authors contemporary with Tolkien who dealt in the theme of the corrupting influence of power: George Orwell with Animal Farm (1945), William Golding with Lord of the Flies (1954), and T. H. White with The Once and Future King (1958). In his view, this was largely a modern idea; he writes that the nearest medieval equivalent is the Old English proverb "man deþ swa he byþ þonne he mot swa he wile": "A man does as he is when he can do what he wants", i.e. power reveals existing character, rather than changing it for the worse. The Lord of the Rings is largely medieval in its setting, but its attitude to the corrupting effect of power is an anachronism, something wholly modern. He sees a modern echo, too, in Boromir's response to the Ring, with "all the signals which the twentieth century has learned to distrust", including fascination with power even if it is the Enemy's; his speech praising "the fearless" and then "the ruthless" as the way to victory; the portrayal of himself as a leader with "power of Command"; and eventually "the naked appeal to force".

Jack Brown comments that Tolkien "witnessed with disgust the rise of communism and fascism" in the years after the First World War, notes that he makes Gandalf reject the use of the Ring "for fear that it w[ould] lead to tyranny", and remarks that some characters recognise that such "absolute power is too dangerous to be used", while others fail to do so. The Tolkien scholars Agnes Perkins and Helen Hill, writing in A Tolkien Compass, analyse the corrupting effect of power. They pay particular attention to the Ring, but point out that the issue is wider than that, as some characters were corrupted long before the Rings were forged. They view Tolkien's scheme as having five groups of three characters, each affected differently by power.

Agnes Perkins and Helen Hill's analysis of the corrupting effect of power, especially of the Ring
Group	Character	Effects of power (including the Ring)
Wholly corrupted already	Sauron	Unrelieved evil; he put power into the One Ring with the intention of gaining evil control
Wholly corrupted already	The 9 Ringwraiths	Servants of Sauron, wholly taken over by the Rings of Power
Wholly corrupted already	Gollum	Split character
Of an earlier time, Ring means nothing to them	Shelob	Unquestionably evil, gluttonous: only interested in food
Of an earlier time, Ring means nothing to them	Treebeard	Too old to desire power
Of an earlier time, Ring means nothing to them	Tom Bombadil	In complete control in his own territory, "unwilling to go outside his self-imposed boundaries"
"The Great", who could wield the Ring	Saruman	Succumbs to desire for power
"The Great", who could wield the Ring	Gandalf	Rejects the Ring when Frodo offers it; rejects Saruman's proposal to wield power together
"The Great", who could wield the Ring	Galadriel	Is tempted to take or accept the Ring; passes the test
Men of Gondor	Boromir	Urges use of Ring to defend Gondor against Sauron
Men of Gondor	Denethor	Desires the Ring but does not get a chance to seize it; is destroyed by his own pride, challenging Sauron
Men of Gondor	Faramir	"Understands the danger of the Ring", chooses not to take it
Heroes	Frodo	Bravely accepts quest to destroy the Ring; it comes to dominate his will; temptation proves too much
Heroes	Sam	Tempted strongly but for a short time; "he alone gives up the Ring willingly" to Frodo
Heroes	Aragorn	Has right to rule as heir to throne; fights steadily against evil; gains power by moral right

=== A single explanation ===
The literary critic Colin Manlove criticises Tolkien's attitude towards power as inconsistent, with exceptions to the supposedly overwhelming influence of the Ring. The Ring can be handed over relatively easily (Sam and Bilbo), and removing the Ring by force (Gollum to Frodo) does not, despite Gandalf's assertion at the beginning of the story, break Frodo's mind. The Ring also appears to have little effect on characters such as Aragorn, Legolas and Gimli. Shippey notes that, despite Manlove, Tolkien is fair in showing a regular pattern of "creeping corruption": Bilbo becomes angry when Gandalf tries to coax him to give up the Ring, and is seen as "a little wrinkled creature with a hungry face and bony groping hands" when he asks Frodo to let him look at the Ring just one more time; Isildur uses Gollum-like words with "It is precious to me, though I buy it with great pain"; there is Gollum's corrupted state throughout the story; and there are the ominous signals from Boromir. Shippey replies to Manlove's doubt with "one word": addictive. He writes that this sums up Gandalf's whole argument, as in the early stages, as with Bilbo and Sam, the addiction can be shaken off easily enough, while for those who are not yet addicted, as with Aragorn and indeed others like Galadriel and Faramir, its pull is like any other temptation. What Gandalf could not do to Frodo, Shippey writes, is make him want to hand the Ring over. And for the owner of the Ring, the destructive aspect is the urge to use it, no matter how good the intentions of the owner might be at the start. Katz writes that "it is clear that Tolkien is demonstrating to us the progressive forces of corruption of the possession and use of the One Ring"; usage may begin innocently or accidentally, but "its seductive power" gradually wears down any resistance.

Other critics, too, have described the Ring as addictive, with each use progressively increasing the hold the Ring has over its bearer. Bilbo, while possessing the Ring for some time, is able to give it away willingly, though with considerable difficulty. Later, when he encounters the Ring in Rivendell, he experiences a powerful longing to hold it again. Frodo also shows features of addiction, ultimately becoming unable to relinquish the Ring of his own accord.

In Peter Jackson's The Lord of the Rings film trilogy, the effects of the Ring on Bilbo and Frodo are obsessions that have been compared with drug addiction; the actor Andy Serkis, who played Gollum, cited drug addiction as an inspiration for his performance. Critical theory scholar Douglas Kellner, examining the question of whether the work is an allegory despite Tolkien's statement to the contrary, writes that Gollum serves as "a cautionary warning as to what obsession with the Ring and addiction to power can do to someone. In deprivation, he craves his 'precious' talisman of power, although he knows its destructive force. The film presents a parable of addiction, as Gollum is torn apart by his need for the destructive substance".

=== Revealing each character's morality ===
Katz argues that Tolkien uses the device of the Ring and its addictive power to reveal each character's morality in turn. The extreme case is Sméagol, whose addiction to the Ring becomes more pronounced as, over 500 years, he is wholly overcome by its power. He is transformed into the monstrous creature Gollum, showing traits ranging from withdrawal and isolation to suspicion and anger towards others; his obsession with the Ring leads to his demise. Eventually he is "utterly destroyed" by the pull of the Ring.

Eric Katz's analysis of how addiction to the power of the One Ring uncovers each character's morality
Character	Effect of the Ring on the character	Character's morality
Sméagol / Gollum	Sméagol kills his friend Déagol to gain the Ring; over the centuries is "almost completely corrupted" by desire for the Ring; is made "a miserable creature, afraid of everything, friendless, homeless, constantly seeking his 'precious' Ring"; personality disintegrates, talking to himself as two halves, Sméagol and Gollum; eventually gains the Ring and dies, destroying it and himself	Desire, greed; loses his soul
Boromir	Seduced by power of the Ring, and the idea of using it for good; sees himself as a great warrior wielding the Ring against Mordor; becomes separated from the Fellowship; repents, tries to save Merry and Pippin, but is killed by Orcs	Virtuous—"noble, good-hearted, and brave", corrupted by power, for good of his country, Gondor
Galadriel	Is offered the Ring by Frodo; admits "my heart has greatly desired to ask what you offer"; displays how powerful she might be if she used it; rejects all use of Ring, with "I pass the test... I will diminish, and go into the West, and remain Galadriel"	Remains herself, an immortal Elf
Frodo	Makes limited use of the Ring at first (checking that Tom Bombadil has returned the real Ring), then "by accident" in the inn at Bree, then when compelled by the Nazgul on Weathertop; later, freely to escape from Boromir on Amon Hen. He is progressively taken over, weighed down physically and psychologically; eventually succumbs	Resistant, but unable to overcome its power; ultimately unable to destroy the Ring
Sam	Makes limited use of the Ring; eventually sees where it would lead, imagining himself as "Samwise the Strong, Hero of the Age, striding with a flaming sword across the darkened land ... and ... the vale of Gorgoroth became a garden of flowers and trees and brought forth fruit", but seeing he would quickly be defeated, and rejects its use	Saved by his love for Frodo, and his "still unconquered ... plain hobbit-sense"; remains himself
Tom Bombadil	None, it has no power over him	Remains himself, an immortal being

=== Overcoming the addiction ===
The Tolkien scholar Patrick Curry writes that Tolkien's narrative is not limited to "a single, all-consuming crisis: the War of the Ring dominates, but is not absolutely everything", and furthermore "Nor is the end of the Ring a purely voluntary, willed and idealistic renunciation": the addiction is not broken by a single choice. Instead, he argues, that is brought about by "countless acts of courage, kindness and help, both small and great, from unknown people and forces, in unforeseen circumstances, that together provide an opportunity to do the right thing." That in turn is accompanied by "a commitment to the simple good things of life – food, water, green and growing things", making "an appreciation of life itself, at once natural and spiritual" the value that succeeds. Curry sees this as offering hope in the real world, and the principal message of Tolkien's writings. Curry cites the moment when Sam is saved from the Ring's temptation:

The one small garden of a free gardener was all his need and due, not a garden swollen to a realm; his own hands to use, not the hands of others to command. (Note: Tolkien 1955, book 6, ch. 1 "The Tower of Cirith Ungol")

Saruman, a Wizard not a warrior, expresses the temptation to Gandalf, in the hope of persuading him, as "Knowledge, Rule, Order". (Note: Tolkien 1954, book 2, ch. 2 "The Council of Elrond") The Episcopal priest and Tolkien scholar Fleming Rutledge writes that Saruman's triad is capitalised "as though they were Powers. They sound oppressive, like Nazi slogans ... in the German fashion". She notes the half-elf Elrond's description of the lust for power: "strength, domination, and hoarded wealth", which Elrond contrasts with another triad, "understanding, making, and healing". She explains that these "softer, gentler" things are "more powerful than any conventional weapons".

== Sources ==
- Bell, Anita Miller (2009). 'The Lord of the Rings' and the Emerging Generation: A Study of the Message and Medium. J. R. R. Tolkien and Peter Jackson. p. 56. ISBN 978-1-10924-676-6.
- Brown, Jack (20 October 2022). "The Lord of the Rings and the corrupting influence of power". Pacific Legal Foundation.
- Curry, Patrick (1998) [1997]. Defending Middle-earth: Tolkien: Myth and Modernity. HarperCollins. ISBN 978-0-26110-371-9.
- Katz, Eric (2003). "The Rings of Tolkien and Plato: Lessons in Power, Choice, and Morality". In Bassham, Gregory (ed.). The Lord of the Rings and Philosophy: One Book to Rule Them All. Open Court. pp. 5–20. ISBN 978-0-81269-545-8. OCLC 863158193.
- Kellner, Douglas (2006). "The Lord of the Rings as Allegory: A Multiperspectivist Reading". In Ernest Mathijs; Murray Pomerance (eds.). From Hobbits to Hollywood: Essays on Peter Jackson's Lord of the Rings. Vol. 3. Rodopi. ISBN 978-9-04201-682-8.
- Manlove, Colin N. (1978) [1975]. "J. R. R. Tolkien (1892-1973) and The Lord of the Rings". Modern Fantasy: Five Studies. Cambridge University Press. pp. 152–206. ISBN 978-0-521-29386-0. OCLC 8661848.
- Perkins, Agnes; Hill, Helen (1975). "The Corruption of Power". In Lobdell, Jared (ed.). A Tolkien Compass. Open Court. pp. 57–68. ISBN 978-0875483030.
- Plato; Jowett, Benjamin (2009) [360 B.C.]. The Republic. Internet Classics Archive.
- Roberts, Adam (2006). "The One Ring". In Eaglestone, Robert (ed.). Reading The Lord of the Rings: New Writings on Tolkien's Classic. Continuum International Publishing Group. p. 63. ISBN 978-0-82648-460-4.
- Rutledge, Fleming (2003). The Battle for Middle-Earth: Tolkien's Divine Design in The Lord of the Rings. William B. Eerdmans. ISBN 978-0-8028-2497-4. OCLC 52559213.
- Serkis, Andy (21 March 2003). "Andy Serkis BBC interview". BBC News.
- Shippey, Tom (2002). J.R.R. Tolkien: Author of the Century. HarperCollins. ISBN 978-0-26110-401-3.
- Sommer, Mark (7 July 2004). "Addicted to the Ring". Hollywoodjesus.com – Pop Culture From A Spiritual Point of View. Archived from the original on 22 June 2013.
- Spacks, Patricia Meyer (2004). "Power and Meaning in The Lord of the Rings". In Rose A. Zimbardo; Neil D. Isaacs (eds.). Understanding the Lord of the Rings: The Best of Tolkien Criticism. Houghton Mifflin. pp. 52–67. ISBN 978-0-61842-253-1.
- Tolkien, J. R. R. (1954). The Fellowship of the Ring. George Allen & Unwin. OCLC 12228601.
- Tolkien, J. R. R. (1955). The Return of the King. The Lord of the Rings. Boston: Houghton Mifflin. OCLC 519647821.
- Tolkien, J. R. R. (1977). Christopher Tolkien (ed.). The Silmarillion. Boston: Houghton Mifflin. ISBN 978-0-395-25730-2.
- Yell, David M. (2007). The Drama of Man. Xulon Press. ISBN 978-1-60266-768-6.
