= Tolkien on Film =

Scholarly book

Tolkien on Film: Essays on Peter Jackson's Lord of the Rings
- First edition, with a drawing of a strip of film emerging from Tolkien's pipe
- Editor: Janet Brennan Croft
- Author: see text
- Language: English
- Subject: Tolkien studies
- Genre: Scholarly essays
- Publisher: Mythopoeic Press
- Publication date: 2004
- Media type: Paperback
- Pages: 323
- ISBN: 978-1-887726-09-2

Tolkien on Film: Essays on Peter Jackson's Lord of the Rings is a 2004 collection of literary studies essays edited by Janet Brennan Croft. It discusses Peter Jackson's interpretation of The Lord of the Rings in his 2001–2003 film trilogy based on J. R. R. Tolkien's fantasy book.

The collection was seen as quite negative by scholars. The film scholar Kristin Thompson felt that the book's denigration of Jackson was disappointing, and that too many of the essays were catalogues of differences between film and book, complete with adverse commentary. In her view, these made the error of assuming that Jackson was trying to be as faithful as possible to the book and failing, while Thompson argued that Jackson was aiming to please a modern audience, making intentional changes to achieve this goal. Other scholars gave mixed responses, while noting that the collection represents the many Tolkien scholars and fans who do not feel that the films succeeded in representing Tolkien's book.

== Background ==
J. R. R. Tolkien was an English philologist and professor of English interested in medieval literature at the University of Oxford, and a Roman Catholic. In 1954–55, he published the three volumes of his fantasy The Lord of the Rings; sales have exceeded 150 million copies. In 2001–2003, the New Zealand film director Peter Jackson released a big-budget film trilogy of The Lord of the Rings. His interpretation of the book differed markedly from the themes expressed by Tolkien, evoking strong reactions from film-goers, Tolkien fans, and scholars alike.

The essay collection Tolkien on Film was the first to be produced in reaction to the film trilogy, appearing in 2004. In a note to the Second Printing, the book's editor Janet Brennan Croft wrote that "This collection remains, we feel, the most important gathering of criticism on the film from a literary studies perspective, as opposed to a film studies perspective. Film studies has different aims and concerns, a different vocabulary, and different theoretical underpinnings from those a reader will encounter in this book." Accordingly, the essays in the book are mostly written by scholars, not film critics (J. E. Smyth excepted); apart from Croft herself, the authors include the Tolkien scholars David Bratman and Jane Chance, the scholar of fantasy Amy H. Sturgis, and the fantasy author Diana Paxson.

== Essay summaries ==
The essays
Part	Author	Discipline	Title	Summary
Introduction	Janet Brennan Croft	Tolkien scholar	Introduction	The editor states that the "blockbuster" films generated varied reactions from viewers, readers of Tolkien's book, and scholars. Views range from delight at the films' success and awards, to finding them "profoundly antithetical, or even sacrilegious, to Tolkien's text and themes and almost too painful to watch." She states that "we tried to solicit strong and convincingly argued opinions on all sides", accepting that "not all the views ... will be to every reader's taste."
Film history	J.E. Smyth	Film critic	The Three Ages of Imperial Cinema from the Death of Gordon to The Return of the King	Smyth compares the themes of Jackson's films to those of the 1939 The Four Feathers by Alexander and Zoltan Korda, and to the 1962 Lawrence of Arabia by David Lean. She states that the Great War and the fall of the British Empire marked these films, and that Jackson's films mark the rebirth of "heroic imperialism" facing enemies in the East.
Adaptation / Revision	David Bratman	Tolkien scholar	Summa Jacksonica: A Reply to Defenses of Peter Jackson's The Lord of the Rings Films, after St. Thomas Aquinas	Bratman presents points made by others in defence of Jackson's approach, and attempts to refute each one in the style of Aquinas. He criticises numerous aspects of the book, but states that he likes Jackson's Boromir, and his handling of the Wormtongue-Éowyn relationship, and especially Frodo and Gandalf's discussion of "the moral question of Gollum", and Éowyn's "defiant speech on fearing being locked up in a cage".
Adaptation / Revision	Janet Brennan Croft	Tolkien scholar	Mithril Coats and Tin Ears: "Anticipation" and "Flattening" in Peter Jackson's The Lord of the Rings Trilogy	Croft notes that fans of the book were often "deeply disappointed" by the films. She suggests that the reason is that where Tolkien subtly builds tension, Jackson "habit[ually]" gives away what will happen, just like Morton Zimmerman's script, which Tolkien disliked. Croft argues that both men "flatten[ed]" Tolkien's characters, dialogue, and plot.
Adaptation / Revision	Diana Paxson	Fantasy author	Re-vision: The Lord of the Rings in Print and on Screen	Paxson writes that people usually "receive a book or a film as holy writ, direct from the mind of the maker, but it takes time for a work's creator to see it thus." She compares Tolkien's and Jackson's creative processes, noting that both, as seen in Christopher Tolkien's The History of The Lord of the Rings and the extended versions of Jackson's films, continually "re-vision[ed]" the story.
Heroes and Leaders	Kayla McKinney Wiggins	Scholar of Folklore	The Art of the Story-Teller and the Person of the Hero	Wiggins writes that "If Tolkien's novel is epic fantasy, Jackson's interpretations of it are epic films." She finds their vision and execution "grand", and the extensive battle scenes "quite impressive". But she feels that Tolkien's focus on "narrative and the gradual evolution of character" is "largely lost" in the film version. In her view, Jackson misses Tolkien's treatment of Aragorn as an "epic hero" and of Frodo as an "Everyman" "fairy tale hero". Instead, Jackson "offers the conflicted, modern protagonist, smaller in scope and lesser in nature."
Heroes and Leaders	Daniel Timmons	Tolkien scholar	Frodo on Film: Peter Jackson's Problematic Portrayal	Timmons writes that Jackson's portrayal of the Hobbit protagonist Frodo, played by Elijah Wood, "diverges from the letter and spirit of Tolkien's book". Timmons suggests that this is to appeal to filmgoers, "used to frenetic melodrama and staged suspense". Frodo's "humble and heroic trials" are replaced by "a reconstructed and flawed" account, making him "a common individual", "divested ... of his unique and noble character". However, the final scene of the film trilogy, Timmons writes, goes back to "Tolkien's great book" for its "poignant and powerful ending", as Frodo sails off into the West, to what Tolkien calls "a far green country under a swift sunrise".
Heroes and Leaders	Judith Kollmann	Scholar of English	Elisions and Ellipses: Counsel and Council in Tolkien's and Jackson's The Lord of the Rings	Jackson's versions of the Council of Elrond at Rivendell, and Gandalf's council at Minas Tirith ("The Last Debate"), are "abbreviated" and radically modified. The Council of Elrond is compressed to a short argument, emphasising a reluctant Aragorn, not Frodo. The Last Debate, without the Princes of Gondor, becomes a casual meeting of friends within the Fellowship of the Ring; and it is Aragorn, not Gandalf, who sets out the seemingly reckless approach, to go and fight Mordor at the Black Gate.
A Woman's Part	Jane Chance	Tolkien scholar	Tolkien's Women (and Men): The Films and the Book	In Chance's view, Jackson shifts the story's "focus from Frodo's hero-journey ... to the love story of Arwen and Aragorn". This "subordinates and devalues ... Tolkien's key theme of the ennoblement of the ordinary to the more ordinary marriage of the nobility." She notes that this gives women a more central place than in Tolkien, taking "The Tale of Aragorn and Arwen" from an appendix to centre stage. In her view, this does honour a "central concern" of Tolkien's mythology.
A Woman's Part	Cathy Akers-Jordan	Writing instructor	Fairy Princess or Tragic Heroine? The Metamorphosis of Arwen Undómiel in Peter Jackson's The Lord of the Rings Films	In Akers-Jordan's view, the film Arwen may seem to be unlike Tolkien's, but she is presented as a "true descendant of her heroic ancestors, such as Lúthien, Eärendil, and Galadriel."
A Woman's Part	Victoria Gaydosik	Scholar of English	"Crimes Against the Book"? The Transformation of Tolkien's Arwen from Page to Screen and the Abandonment of the Psyche Archetype	Examining Jackson's treatment of Arwen, Gaydosik quotes screenwriter Fran Walsh's joking remark "Crimes against the book!". She notes that the heroine's journey is less familiar than the hero's; Tolkien uses "Psyche, a passive love-object" as archetype for Arwen. Jackson is informed instead by cinema's "pumped-up action-adventure heroine", though the second film, The Two Towers, backed away from presenting Arwen wielding a sword in battle, informed by fans' reaction to the first film. Gaydosik suggests that the films succeed in developing the mythology that Tolkien had wished to create, indeed that a mythology consists of "stories that keep being told and retold".
A Woman's Part	Maureen Thum	Scholar of English	The "Sub-Subcreation" of Galadriel, Arwen, and Éowyn: Women of Power in Tolkien's and Jackson's The Lord of the Rings	Thum notes that Tolkien describes people who tell fairy tales as sub-creators. In her view, Jackson succeeds in this role, portraying Galadriel, Arwen, and Éowyn as powerful women, just as Tolkien did, without "falsification or distortion ... as some critics have argued". She examines Yavanna, Varda, and Lúthien from The Silmarillion and Unfinished Tales, showing that in his Legendarium, Tolkien, far from being "anti-feminist", placed women in "pivotal roles". She argues that in The Lord of the Rings, the female figures are much more important than their "relatively brief appearances" might suggest.
Fan Fiction	Susan Booker	Arts Librarian	Tales Around the Internet Campfire: Fan Fiction in Tolkien's Universe	Booker examines Tolkien fan fiction inspired by Jackson's films. Commenting that "Some colleagues cringe" at her subject, she states that by 2004 there were around 300,000 fan websites of stories set in Middle-earth, and that to "study alligators" one needs to visit "treacherous bayous". She notes that some fan authors have never read Tolkien, relying entirely on Jackson's narration. Booker notes, too, that despite Christopher Tolkien's 12-volume The History of Middle-earth, there are plenty of gaps that fans can enjoy filling in. She attempts to characterise these authors, and their readership.
Fan Fiction	Amy H. Sturgis	Scholar of Fantasy	Make Mine "Movieverse": How the Tolkien Fan Fiction Community Learned to Stop Worrying and Love Peter Jackson	Sturgis notes that fan fiction, conventionally dated to a Star Trek fanzine in 1967, could be said to have started in the Middle Ages, when authors "embellished and explored" Arthurian legend. Tolkien fandom too has a long history. Fanfiction.net alone had over 30,000 Middle-earth stories by 2004; and there were hundreds of Tolkien forums and online groups, not all following Jackson. Some traded in stories, others in images, poetry, or songs.
The Lucky Number	Mark Shea	Catholic writer	The Lord of the Rings: A Source-Critical Analysis	Shea ends the book with a parody of a learned work of philological scholarship. He states that "Experts in source-criticism now know that The Lord of the Rings is a redaction of sources ranging from The Red Book of Westmarch (W) to Elvish Chronicles (E) to Gondorian records (G) to orally transmitted tales of the Rohirrim (R)," each with "their own agendas", like "the 'Tolkien' (T) and 'Peter Jackson' (PJ) redactors". He notes confidently that "we may be quite certain that 'Tolkien' (if he ever existed) did not write this work in the conventional sense, but that it was assembled over a long period of time..." Shea adds that "T is heavily dependent on G records and clearly elevates the claims of the Aragorn monarchy over the House of Denethor." He comments that "Of course, the 'Ring' motif appears in countless folk tales and is to be discounted altogether", while "the 'Gandalf' narratives" seem to be shamanistic legends, recorded in W "out of deference to local Shire cultic practice."

== Publication history ==
Tolkien on Film was published in 2004 in paperback by the Mythopoeic Press. The book is not illustrated. A "Second Printing" appeared in 2010 with a brief note by Croft; the table of contents and ISBN were unchanged.

== Reception ==
=== Of the whole book ===
Reviewing the book for Tolkien Studies, the film scholar Kristin Thompson wrote that the book came out before the authors could see the special extended edition of the last film of the trilogy, making its publication appear somewhat hasty, if not unscholarly. Thompson notes that "several of the contributors" dislike Jackson's film trilogy, and that few of the contributions are by film scholars, so that not many are "actually about Jackson's film as such." She notes that the field of "cinema studies" has diverged from older literary criticism with its "adaptation studies" that existed until the 1970s; and that some of the essays in the book are "more like lists of complaints" than "classic adaptation studies". She suggests that the "frequent denigration" of Jackson will disappoint film fans who read the book.

Some years later, Janice Bogstad and Philip Kaveny, introducing their 2011 scholarly collection on the same subject, Picturing Tolkien, wrote that Croft's edited collection found Jackson's films "wanting", adding that the book "speaks both to and from the sizable body of Tolkien scholars and enthusiasts who do not believe this film series succeeded, and/or that any film version could succeed." Thompson noted in her essay in that collection that a contributor on TheOneRing.net described the book as "a mix of pro/con articles related to the films, mostly con though as I recall." Thompson immediately continued by saying that "the condescension and dismissal that the film has sometimes met in scholarly circles reminds me somewhat of the disdain many of Tolkien's colleagues felt for his fiction", as to them the point was not whether his books were any good, but that "they were broadly popular and hence frivolous."

=== Of specific essays ===
On the contributions, Thompson finds Smyth's essay odd, only focusing on the film in its last two pages, and disagreeing with its view that the film is imperialist; she contends that it is the opposite, as Sauron not Aragorn is the imperial aggressor. She comments that an overview of the background to the film's making, or its relationship to the fantasy genre, would have been more useful. She thinks Bratman's and Croft's essays are regrettable catalogues of differences between film and book, complete with "adverse commentary thereon". She notes that Paxson's analysis is more positive, seeing "changes as revision rather than adaptation" and welcoming the sequence on the lighting of the beacons (to warn Rohan of the attack on Gondor). She finds Wiggins and Timmons just as "disapproving" as Bratman and Croft, stating that all of them suppose that Jackson was trying to be as faithful as possible to Tolkien's "story, tone, and meaning", but "largely failed". In Thompson's view, Jackson's team instead aimed to please a modern audience, so they made changes intentionally, and explained their rationale in interviews on the extended DVDs. She criticises the reviewers as naive for not grasping the "corporate forces and financial pressures" on Jackson. Thompson is more accepting of the essays on women in the films, finding them thoughtful, except for Chance's, which she thinks makes the trying-to-be-faithful assumption. She thinks the two fan fiction essays richly informed and apparently the first to focus exclusively on The Lord of the Rings. She finds their introductions to fan fiction terminology useful, but doubts whether their Google searches have yielded accurate statistics. Thompson concludes that rather than trying to "catch flies with vinegar", Croft and her authors would do better to tell fans that if they like the films, they may also enjoy the book if they try reading it, stating "Many [of them] already have."

James Davis praises Thum for seeking to show that the films can help people understand the book, in contrast to taking one side or the other on Jackson's merits. He notes Thum's well-argued case that Arwen is following in the footsteps of Lúthien, "who was indeed a 'Warrior Princess'", and that Jackson brings out her place in Middle-earth better than Tolkien does in The Lord of the Rings.

Yvette Kisor writes that in her essay Mithril Coats and Tin Ears, Croft focuses narrowly on the "immediate effects" of Jackson's changes, such as the "loss of dramatic irony" from Jackson's intercutting in place of Tolkien's suspenseful interlacing. Kisor contrasts Croft here with Cara Lane's "less outwardly negative ... assessment ... [but] perhaps more significant losses to the core meaning of the novel", namely that interlace "allows plot threads to dangle for prolonged periods and forces readers to make connections between events on their own", whereas intercutting "substantially alter[s] the structure and tone of the story." The activity required of the reader makes them share the confusion and incomplete knowledge of the characters, bringing out "an important theme of the novel".

Tobias Hock and Frank Weinreich note that Bratman finds the films' emphasis on violence excessive, largely replacing "Tolkien's moral sense". They dispute the excessiveness, while agreeing that some instances of the loss of Tolkien's moral attitude, like Aragorn's "Show them no mercy" before the Battle of Helm's Deep are "serious" because these "go completely against the religious and ethical worldview" of the book. They similarly endorse Bratman's argument about Gandalf's character.

== See also ==
- Picturing Tolkien, a 2011 essay collection edited by Janice M. Bogstad and Philip E. Kaveny

== Sources ==
- Bogstad, Janice M.; Kaveny, Philip E., eds. (2011). Picturing Tolkien: Essays on Peter Jackson's 'The Lord of the Rings' Film Trilogy. McFarland. ISBN 978-0-7864-8473-7.
- Croft, Janet Brennan, ed. (2004). Tolkien on Film: Essays on Peter Jackson's The Lord of the Rings. Mythopoeic Press. ISBN 978-1-887726-09-2.
- Croft, Janet Brennan, ed. (2010) [2004]. Tolkien on Film: Essays on Peter Jackson's The Lord of the Rings (2nd Printing ed.). Mythopoeic Press. ISBN 978-1-887726-09-2. (added note by Croft, p. x; contents and ISBN unchanged)
- Davis, James G. (2008). "Showing Saruman as Faber: Tolkien and Peter Jackson". Tolkien Studies. 5 (1): 55–71. doi:10.1353/tks.0.0009.
- Hock, Tobias; Weinreich, Frank (2014). Fornet-Ponse, Thomas (ed.). "Splatter in Middle-earth? War and Violence between Book and Screen – a comparison" (PDF). Hither Shore - Interdisciplinary Journal on Modern Fantasy Literature. 10 (Adaptations of Tolkien´s 'Lord of the Rings'): 44–61.
- Kisor, Yvette (2011). "Making the Connection on Page and Screen in Tolkien's and Jackson's The Lord of the Rings". In Bogstad, Janice M.; Kaveny, Philip E. (eds.). Picturing Tolkien. McFarland. pp. 102–115. ISBN 978-0-7864-8473-7.
- Lane, Cara (2005). "The Ring Returns: Adaptation and the Trilogy". Film & History: An Interdisciplinary Journal of Film and Television Studies. 35 (1): 67–69. doi:10.1353/flm.2005.0020.
- Thompson, Kristin (2006). "Tolkien on Film: Essays on Peter Jackson's 'The Lord of the Rings' (review)". Tolkien Studies. 3: 222–228. doi:10.1353/tks.2006.0035. S2CID 170135592 – via Project Muse.
- Thompson, Kristin (2011). "Gollum Talks to himself". In Bogstad, Janice M.; Kaveny, Philip E. (eds.). Picturing Tolkien. McFarland. pp. 25–45. ISBN 978-0-7864-8473-7.
