= Zimbardo =

Zimbardo is a surname. Notable people with the surname include:

- Philip Zimbardo (1933–2024), American social psychologist
- Rose Zimbardo (1932–2015), American academic
