= Picturing Tolkien =

Scholarly analysis of film series

- The cover image shows Frodo with the sword Sting and the Phial of Galadriel, entering Shelob's lair.
- Editor: Janice M. Bogstad and Philip E. Kaveny
- Author: see text
- Language: English
- Subject: Tolkien studies
- Genre: Scholarly essays
- Publisher: McFarland
- Publication date: 2011
- Media type: Paperback
- ISBN: 978-0-7864-8473-7

Picturing Tolkien: Essays on Peter Jackson's The Lord of the Rings Film Trilogy is a 2011 collection of essays on Peter Jackson's 2001–2003 film representation of J. R. R. Tolkien's 1954–1955 fantasy, The Lord of the Rings. It is edited by Janice M. Bogstad and Philip E. Kaveny.

The book contains analyses by scholars of film and of literature of Peter Jackson's interpretation of The Lord of the Rings from multiple points of view. Reviewers, noting that the decade elapsed since the films appeared gave the authors some perspective on the films after the initial heated debate, found the collection interesting, measured, and worthwhile both for scholars and for Tolkien fans.

== Context ==
Picturing Tolkien analyses Peter Jackson's film adaptation of J. R. R. Tolkien's fantasy book The Lord of the Rings. Tolkien was a Roman Catholic writer and philologist. Peter Jackson's successful film adaptation consists of 3 films. Although long for a film trilogy, this was short compared to Tolkien's work, presenting the films' makers with a major challenge of abridgement, compression, and transformation for the production of the series. Scholars and fans were divided on how well the films manage to represent the spirit of the book, from feeling that it had been lost, to granting that some elements were lost but others suitably substituted, to seeing the films as a remarkable cinematic tribute to Tolkien.

== Synopsis ==
- Janice M. Bogstad and Philip E. Kaveny: "Introduction"

=== Part I. Techniques of Story and Structure ===
- Kristin Thompson: "Gollum Talks to Himself" discusses whether The Lord of the Rings can be successfully adapted to film, admitting that the question is itself remarkable given the commercial success of Jackson's films. She writes that despite the evident problems, there is much to admire in Jackson's work.
- Verlyn Flieger: "Sometimes One Word Is Worth a Thousand Pictures" writes that filmmakers can be tempted to show something just because it can be done. She cautions that less can often be more, and that words can do what pictures cannot, as with Tolkien's mention of the dour Dwarf Gimli "capering" for joy. She feels that the pictures readers see in their own heads are what Tolkien wanted – and managed – to create.
- John D. Rateliff: "Two Kinds of Absence: Elision & Exclusion in Peter Jackson's The Lord of the Rings" explores the events that the films skip over, but at least implicitly allow to have happened ("elision"), such as the Hobbits venturing into the Old Forest, and those that cannot have happened because something in the film version contradicts them ("exclusion"), such as the Hobbits getting swords from the Barrow-wight's treasure, because they are pictured being given swords by Aragorn. He analyses the events at Crickhollow, the Old Forest, with Tom Bombadil, and the Barrow-wight. He concludes that Jackson does brilliantly at including "many minor scenes" in the expanded versions of his film trilogy, but that the major cuts such as those analysed do damage because Tolkien had interwoven his story elements very closely.
- E. L. Risden: "Tolkien's Resistance to Linearity" explores the non-linearity of the narrative structure of The Lord of the Rings, identifying "fractal" and "Gothic" patterns. Risden finds Tolkien's combination of text, maps, and a mass of names "fractal", as they give the reader the impression of a realistic and near-endless diversity in the portrayed world of Middle-earth. On the other hand, he likes elements of Frodo's story to a Gothic cathedral, with Mordor as the altar or place of sacrifice, his suffering as the Stations of the Cross, and the achieving of the quest as the Eucharist.
- Dimitra Fimi: "Filming Folklore" explores how Jackson's films have helped to create a modern folklore tradition that has lived on in media including fantasy artwork, fan fiction, and roleplaying games.
- Yvette Kisor: "Making the Connection on Page and Screen in Tolkien's and Jackson's The Lord of the Rings" examines Tolkien's use of narrative interlacing to create and maintain suspense, as the reader progresses, like the protagonists, not knowing what is going on in other places, where Jackson mostly abandons this to create a readily-followed story, but at the price of making the viewer omniscient, and losing a key Tolkien message, of the importance of courage, of keeping going no matter what.
- Sharin Schroeder: "It's Alive. Tolkien's Monster on the Screen" discusses Jackson's "fascination with monsters", from the Watcher in the Water and the Moria cave troll to the Orcs and Gollum. In her view, "monster creation is the film's raison d'être." She contrasts this with Tolkien's attention to whether monsters have souls.

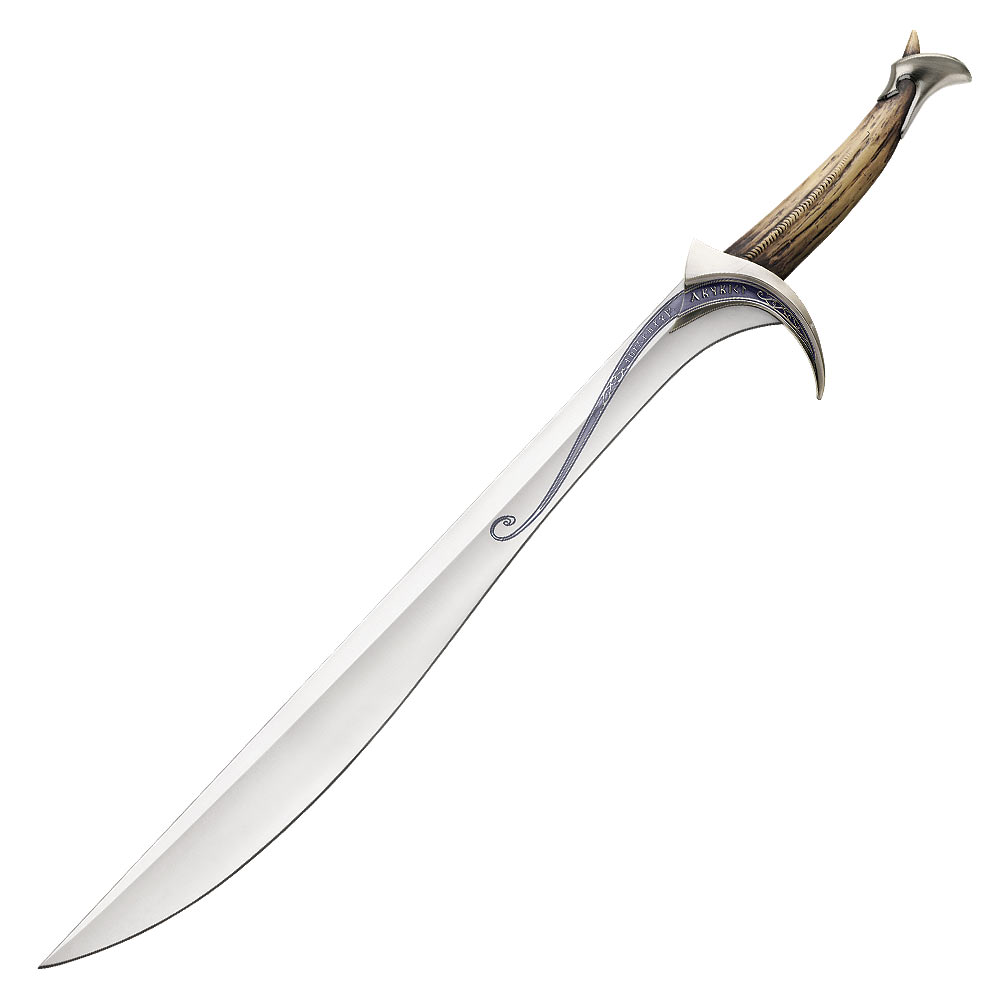
Robert Woosnam-Savage describes the craftsmanship involved in creating the weapons and armour used in Jackson's films. Pictured is the sword Orcrist.

- Robert C. Woosnam-Savage: "The Materiel of Middle-Earth" describes, with inside knowledge, the way that the physical details of armour and weapons were painstakingly created for the films by the Weta Workshop.

=== Part II. Techniques of Character and Culture ===
- Judy Ann Ford and Robin Anne Reid: "Into the West" looks at the imagery Jackson chooses for the end of the film trilogy, how Frodo takes ship at the Grey Havens and departs forever to Valinor. They comment that "the dichotomy between the visual components and the song ... between the cheerful confidence of smiling Hobbits boarding the ship for another adventure then merging into a pure, white light and the weeping listener in the song whose hope is fading in a vision of darkness and shadows — mirrors the two perspectives that Tolkien wrote into this scene".
- Philip E. Kaveny: "Frodo Lives but Gollum Redeems the Blood of Kings" considers the part that Gollum plays, arguing that the character both carries the central narrative and integrates "the big picture of what is at state on a moral, ethical, and spiritual level". He suggests that the film trilogy should have ended with Gollum's destruction of the One Ring.
- Brian D. Walter: "The Grey Pilgrim" examines the role of the Wizard Gandalf in the films, walking the "fine line" between making him as compelling as Tolkien does without allowing him to take over the whole plot. The result is "an oddly ambivalent presence".
- Janet Brennan Croft: "Jackson's Aragorn and the American Superhero Monomyth" argues that Jackson treats Aragorn, the ranger who becomes King, as a typical American film hero, following the pattern of Joseph Campbell's monomyth – the hero goes from the ordinary world into the supernatural realm, meets enormous forces, wins decisively, comes home and confers benefits on those around him; he is selfless, resists temptation, and abstains from sex throughout the quest. Croft writes that this flatters the "adolescent desire to see oneself as the lone redeemer", where Tolkien "challenges us instead to emulate timeless characters of a higher mode than ourselves".
- Richard C. West: "Neither the Shadow Nor the Twilight" discusses Jackson's use of the love story of Aragorn and Arwen, which Tolkien relegates to an Appendix. He writes that the largest change is in Aragorn: where Tolkien has him unswervingly putting his life at risk in the struggle against the Dark Lord Sauron, which could win him the throne and Arwen's hand in marriage, Jackson makes him "highly reluctant to seek the throne that is his inheritance". But he concludes that Jackson's version is "a distinct work of art ... worthwhile in its own right".
- Janice M. Bogstad: "Concerning Horses" explores the role of the sentient horses, which she feels are characters "pivotal to the plot" of both the book and the film versions. The horses serve as icons of culture, especially for the Rohirrim's society based on the horse, but also for the agrarian society of the Shire; further, some, like Shadowfax, are evidently intelligent and able to communicate. A key addition, she argues, is Aragorn's horse, Brego, who helps to present the hero as "warrior, king, liminal being, and partner with an Elf-maiden", placing him in a "less hierarchical mythos" than Tolkien's Middle-earth with its higher beings (wizards) sent by unseen powers.
- Michael D. C. Drout: "The Rohirrim, the Anglo-Saxons, and the Problem of Appendix F" looks at Tolkien's frame story, that the book was translated from the Hobbits' Red Book of Westmarch and that (therefore) the English of the novel represents Middle-earth's Westron, with a mapping between other real-world and fictional languages. That maps the Anglo-Saxons on to the Rohirrim, despite Tolkien's claims to the contrary: they certainly speak the Mercian (West Saxon) dialect of Old English. The Rohirrim, too, are horse-based, unlike the Anglo-Saxons; Tolkien suggested they could be the Anglo-Saxons' Gothic ancestors on the plains of Europe; and Jackson modelled the Rohirrim's equipment closely on the Anglo-Saxons, taking away Tolkien's ambiguity and the "freer play of [the reader's] imagination".
- Joseph Ricke and Catherine Barnett: "Filming the Numinous: The Fate of Lothlórien in Peter Jackson's The Lord of the Rings" examines the challenge of representing the numinous – experiences of beauty, awe, and transcendence – in film. For Tolkien, the numinous was the experience of the holy, on earth; Ricke and Barnett suggest the key moment is when Frodo's eyes are uncovered and he sees the Elvish land of Lothlórien for the first time. They discuss how, even in the heavily compressed Lothlórien film scenes, Jackson captures something of the spirit of Tolkien's vision.

== Publication history ==
Picturing Tolkien was published by McFarland & Company in paperback in 2011. The book is without illustrations except for 3 monochrome photographs in Woosnam-Savage's chapter.

== Reception ==
Anne Petty, reviewing the book for Tolkien Studies, writes that its ten-years-on timeframe from the appearance of Jackson's films enabled its authors to take "more measured and thoughtful" points of view after the "heated" early debate on the merits of "Jackson versus Tolkien". She describes the essays as "a fascinating cross-section of opinion— and expert knowledge—on this monumental visual retelling of Tolkien's Middle-earth saga", with "compelling arguments on both sides". In her opinion, the book is well-balanced in content; it offers fresh points of view; and the individual essays are clear and reasoned. The book starts off with Kristin Thompson's essay, forming "the strongest film defense", and then Verlyn Flieger's, "the strongest book defense". In Petty's view, this works well, enabling the reader to evaluate all the other essays on a scale from Jackson's total success to total failure. She notes that Thompson "cleverly" makes heavy use of the "gold standard" Tolkien scholar Tom Shippey, while Flieger argues tersely in her short essay that CGI fantasy film is quite unsuited to representing anything so language-based as Tolkien's work. She concludes that the book will not "radically change the minds" of people who (like Petty) feel that Jackson "played too fast and loose" with Tolkien, but writes that the collection contains "much to be appreciated".

Emily Auger, in Mythlore, writes that some of the essays, like Dimitra Fimi's on folklore, or Flieger's, John D. Rateliff's, or Thompson's, offer new perspectives on "issues familiar to Tolkien fans and scholars", such as what a Balrog looks like, or why Tom Bombadil was omitted from the films. She calls Fimi's essay "well-articulated", distinguishing "between folklore in film, 'that is, the use of myth, tale types, legend ... in films' and 'folklore about film ... including popular legends and stories about these media, as well as fan ethnography or 'the folklore of audiences'." Auger writes that Fimi likens Jackson's willingness to listen to fans to Tolkien's "keen awareness and study of myth and legend". In Auger's view, the whole collection is of interest both to fans and to scholars, and despite the book's film-oriented objective, is "worthwhile" even for those readers "most dedicated to Tolkien in the original".

The Tolkien scholar Carol A. Leibiger notes Tolkien's documented skepticism that fantasy writing could work as drama, and comments that Thompson in her essay states that critics have mirrored his views with respect to Jackson's films. She notes among the contributions that two professors of English, E. L. Risden and Yvette Kisor, have both explored how well Jackson handles Tolkien's complex interlacing of multiple narrative threads. Risden shows how Jackson makes the story linear, flattening out the asides, and describes what is lost by doing that, such as Tolkien's "exploration of good and evil". Kisor examines how Jackson used "filmic techniques (intercutting, visual doubling, and voice-over) to render Tolkien's interlace techniques and to replicate the connections among interrelated strands of the story." Liebiger states, without comment, that Kisor believes that Jackson managed to create similar emotional effects and cover similar themes to Tolkien. Liebiger finds Robert Woosnam-Savage's "expert commentary" (he is curator of England's Royal Armouries Museum in Leeds) on the craftsmanship involved in creating the weapons and armour "an interesting anomaly" among the scholarly talk of the other essays in the first section of the book, calling it "a welcome addition". In the book's second section, she notes that both Brian D. Walter and Janet Brennan Croft consider the differences between Tolkien's and Jackson's Gandalf, in interestingly different ways. Walter sees Jackson's Gandalf as "reduced and indecisive", offering the heroes Frodo and Aragorn "greater autonomy, where Tolkien's Gandalf is "powerful, authoritative, yet elusive". Croft sees Tolkien's Gandalf as "conservative" and "authoritarian", while the heroes are "reworked" from being satisfyingly idealised to "'low mimetic' film heroes with whom viewers might identify". The result, Leibiger writes, may have been to make Jackson's Gandalf less appealing to audiences than Tolkien's. She is less complimentary about the two editors' own essays which she finds inaccurate, wordy, poorly-written and sometimes vague. In the end, Leibiger commends the editors "for providing a venue for nuanced, interdisciplinary approaches to Jackson's adaptations."

== See also ==
- Tolkien on Film

== Sources ==
- Bogstad, Janice M.; Kaveny, Philip E., eds. (2011). Picturing Tolkien: Essays on Peter Jackson's 'The Lord of the Rings' Film Trilogy. McFarland. ISBN 978-0-7864-8473-7.
