= A Tolkien Compass =

1975 book of literary criticism of Tolkien

- Cover of first edition, designed by Lester Adams
- Editor: Jared Lobdell
- Author: see text
- Language: English
- Subject: Tolkien studies
- Genre: Scholarly essays
- Publisher: Open Court
- Publication date: 1975
- Publication place: United States
- Media type: Print (paperback)
- Pages: 201
- ISBN: 0-87548-303-8
- Dewey Decimal: 823/.912
- LC Class: PR6039.O32 Z69 1975

A Tolkien Compass, a 1975 collection of essays edited by Jared Lobdell, was one of the first books of Tolkien scholarship to be published; it was written without sight of The Silmarillion, published in 1977. Some of the essays have remained at the centre of such scholarship. Most were written by academics for fan-organised conferences. The collection was also the first place where Tolkien's own "Guide to the Names in The Lord of the Rings" became widely available.

The Tolkien scholar Tom Shippey described the essays as written in an innocent time before Tolkien studies became professionalised, and as such they offer "freshness, candor, and a sense of historical depth" that cannot be repeated. Other scholars have stated that two of the essays about The Hobbit have become frequently-cited classics in their field.

== Context ==
J. R. R. Tolkien (1892–1973) was an English Roman Catholic writer, poet, philologist, and academic, best known as the author of the high fantasy works The Hobbit and The Lord of the Rings.

The Lord of the Rings was published in 1954–55; it was awarded the International Fantasy Award in 1957. The publication of the Ace Books and Ballantine paperbacks in the United States helped it to become immensely popular with a new generation in the 1960s. It has remained so ever since, judged by both sales and reader surveys. The literary establishment was initially largely hostile to the book, attacking it in numerous reviews.

== Synopsis ==
The first and second editions contain the following essays:

I. Jared Lobdell. "Introduction". Aside from introducing the essays, he notes that none of them attempt Quellenforschung, the search for Tolkien's sources, but suggests that the matter is worthy of study.

II. Bonniejean Christensen. "Gollum's character transformation in The Hobbit". She finds the "fallen hobbit" Gollum immediately interesting, even apart from Tolkien's changes to the second edition of the novel to make the story fit better with The Lord of the Rings, which make Gollum "fascinating". The key changes are to chapter 5, "Riddles in the Dark": Gollum becomes a far darker character, and the riddle competition becomes deadly serious, as Bilbo will be eaten if he loses.

III. Dorothy Matthews. "The Psychological Journey of Bilbo Baggins", provides an early Jungian approach to Tolkien, suggesting that Gandalf fits the Wise Old Man archetype, and Gollum the Devouring Mother, while Bilbo sets out on his quest "out of balance and far from integrated".

IV. Walter Scheps. "The Fairy-tale Morality of The Lord of the Rings". He argues that Tolkien's morality, revealed in his Middle-earth books, is "radically different from our own" and indeed much like that of fairy tales, so it is not a concern that orcs are black, that trolls are working class, or that enemies come from the south and east. Further, "nobility is inherited rather than acquired".

V. Agnes Perkins and Helen Hill. "The Corruption of Power" examines what power, especially that of the One Ring, does to those who have it. "And the answer is unequivocal: The desire for power corrupts." Of the three wise and ancient characters in The Lord of the Rings, Gandalf and Galadriel see the temptation, and reject it. Saruman succumbs to it. Of the men of Gondor, Boromir tries to seize the Ring; Faramir "understands the danger".

VI. Deborah Rogers. "Everyclod and Everyhero: the image of man in Tolkien" argues that both the Hobbits and Aragorn represent Man. Rogers notes that she knows Hobbits are important, as Tolkien wrote her a letter in 1958 confessing "I am in fact a hobbit." The Hobbits are in her view "small, provincial, and comfort-loving" but not John Bull English: in short, they are cloddish antiheroes. Aragorn, however, is definitely a hero; together, he and the Hobbits form a composite picture of man, a clod with a hero trying to get out.

VII. Richard C. West "The Interlace Structure of The Lord of the Rings" shows that the novel has a complex medieval organisation, in which story threads are interwoven to create a subtly cohesive narrative. It mirrors "the perception of the flux of events in the world around us, where everything is happening at once". The technique allows events to be seen, too, from different points of view. West notes that this is also modern, as writers like James Joyce and Marcel Proust "once again began experimenting" with the medieval technique.

VIII. David Miller. "Narrative pattern in The Fellowship of the Ring" looks at other story structures, noting that with the road as a setting, the "there and back again" novel (he includes The Hobbit) is picaresque. Miller analyses the journey in the first volume as a sequence of "conference[s] in tranquillity", "blundering journey[s]", dangers, and "unexpected aid", as for example the party venturing into the Old Forest, becoming entrapped by Old Man Willow, only to be rescued by Tom Bombadil. He identifies nine such cycles.

IX. Robert Plank. "'The Scouring of the Shire': Tolkien's view of fascism" looks at a single chapter – Book 6, Chapter 8 of The Lord of the Rings, in which the Hobbits return home victorious from their adventures like the hero Odysseus to Ithaca, only to have to "scour" their home of enemies. Plank comments that "the outstanding characteristic of [the chapter] is that miracles do not happen, the laws of nature are in full and undisputed force, [and] the actors in the drama are all human [mortals, whether men or Hobbits]." Thus the chapter is "not fantasy", unlike the rest of the novel. Plank is surprised that Tolkien thinks of the "overthrow of a tyrannical government as a quick and easy job."

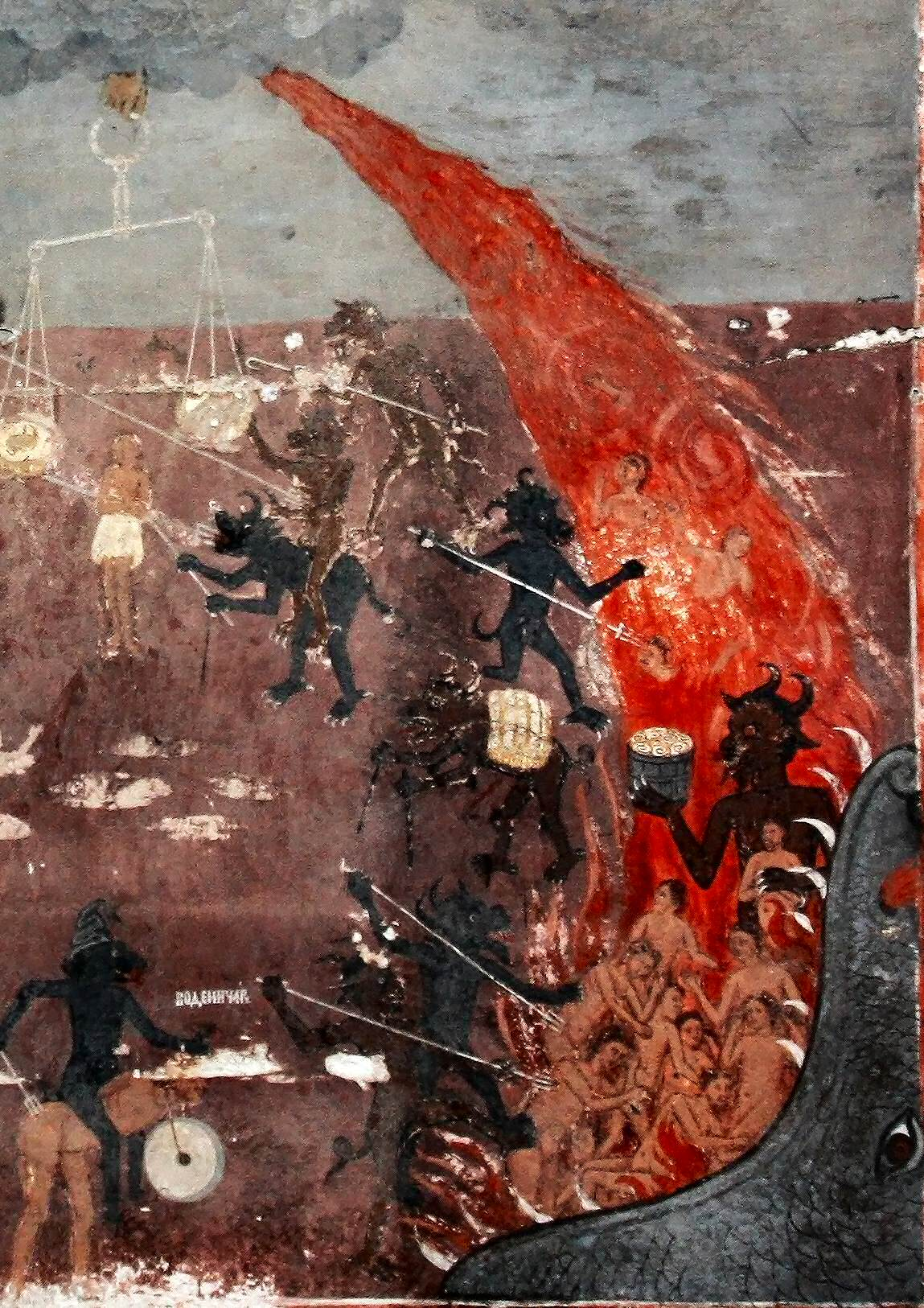
Charles A. Huttar writes that Isengard is an "industrial hell", quoting Tolkien's words "tunneled .. dark .. deep .. graveyard of unquiet dead .. furnaces". Medieval fresco of hell, St Nicholas in Raduil, Bulgaria

X. Charles A. Huttar. "Hell and the city: Tolkien and the traditions of Western literature" looks at the novel's debt to the literary tradition concerning the Christian Hell. The Fellowship's journey through Moria is likened to a descent into Hell, part of a hero's monomyth, while Gandalf's struggle with the Balrog echoes the hero "overcoming a monster of 'the deep'". Frodo's journey to Mordor, too, is such a descent. Huttar considers, too, the various cities with their towers: Minas Tirith of Gondor; Barad-Dûr, the Dark Lord Sauron's fortress; Orthanc, the fallen wizard Saruman's fastness within the industrial Isengard; and either Minas Morgul, home to the nine Nazgûl, or the nearby Cirith Ungol, the watchtower that becomes Frodo's prison. All have become hellish, except for Minas Tirith, the Tower of Guard, which stands against them: "a great city" with its seven walls and seven levels, "but it is dying." This would seem desperate: but "Tolkien sees hope."

XI. U. Milo Kaufmann. "Aspects of the paradisiacal in Tolkien's work" picks out two features of Tolkien's writing: "his uncanny capacity for making us see ordinary objects and actions bursting with the value of wholeness and finality", and "his talent for creating intransigently mysterious landscape." He finds these in "Leaf by Niggle" and in The Lord of the Rings.

The first edition also contains:

XII. J. R. R. Tolkien. "Guide to the names in The Lord of the Rings". Tolkien explains how to translate both personal names like "Treebeard" (by sense) and placenames like "Bag End" (again, by sense), individually listed and explained, and asks that all other names be left untranslated.

The second edition has in addition:

- Tom Shippey. "Foreword". The Tolkien scholar looks back over a generation of scholarship and the transformation of Tolkien's reception by scholars, commenting that A Tolkien Compass, written in a very different time, had stood up well and now offers a unique perspective.

== Publication history ==
A Tolkien Compass was published in paperback by Open Court in 1975. They brought out a second edition in 2003, adding a scholarly foreword by Tom Shippey. The essays consisted mainly of Lobdell's selections from the first and second Conferences on Middle-earth. The book has been translated into French, Swedish, and Turkish. There are no illustrations.

== Reception ==
Tom Shippey commented that A Tolkien Compass appeared "at a time when, in the United Kingdom at least, professing an interest in Tolkien was almost certain death for any hopeful candidate seeking entrance to a department of English". The first edition included Tolkien's "Guide to the Names in The Lord of the Rings"; Shippey called this "immensely valuable" and "deplored" the fact that the Tolkien Estate had demanded it be omitted from later editions. Shippey described the essays as written in the "Age of Innocence" before Tolkien studies became professionalised, and as such offer "freshness, candor, and a sense of historical depth" that cannot be repeated. He noted that some of the early predictions, made before The Silmarillion appeared in 1977 or The History of The Lord of the Rings in 1988–1992, were wrong. For instance, Tolkien had not written much of The Lord of the Rings before the Second World War; but many other predictions have been substantiated, such as Richard C. West's account of Tolkien's use of medieval-style interlacing as a narrative structure.

The Tolkien scholar Janet Brennan Croft has written that West's essay "has proven to have particularly long-lasting impact", while the medievalist Gergely Nagy called the book "a significant early collection".

The librarian and Tolkien scholar David Bratman described the book as "the first commercially published collection of scholarship from the Tolkien fan community." He commented that the essays were originally papers for conferences organised by fans, but were for the most part written by scholars, and that two of the chapters were seen by scholars as "classics in the field": Richard C. West's essay on "The Interlace Structure of The Lord of the Rings, and Bonniejean Christensen's on "Gollum's Character Transformations in The Hobbit".

The librarian Jean MacIntyre, regretting that scholars have paid relatively little attention to The Hobbit compared to Tolkien's other novels, has noted that A Tolkien Compass takes the children's book seriously with two frequently-consulted essays, namely Matthews's psychological interpretation of The Hobbit (MacIntyre notes that Randel Helms had "mocked" this), and Christensen's account of Tolkien's revisions of The Hobbit as he updated Gollum's character.

== See also ==
- Master of Middle-Earth, a 1975 book of Tolkien scholarship

== Sources ==
- Carpenter, Humphrey, ed. (2023) [1981]. The Letters of J. R. R. Tolkien: Revised and Expanded Edition. New York: HarperCollins. ISBN 978-0-35-865298-4.
- Tolkien, J. R. R. (1954). The Two Towers. The Lord of the Rings. Boston: Houghton Mifflin. OCLC 1042159111.
