= Interlacing in The Lord of the Rings =

Literary device in Tolkien's fiction

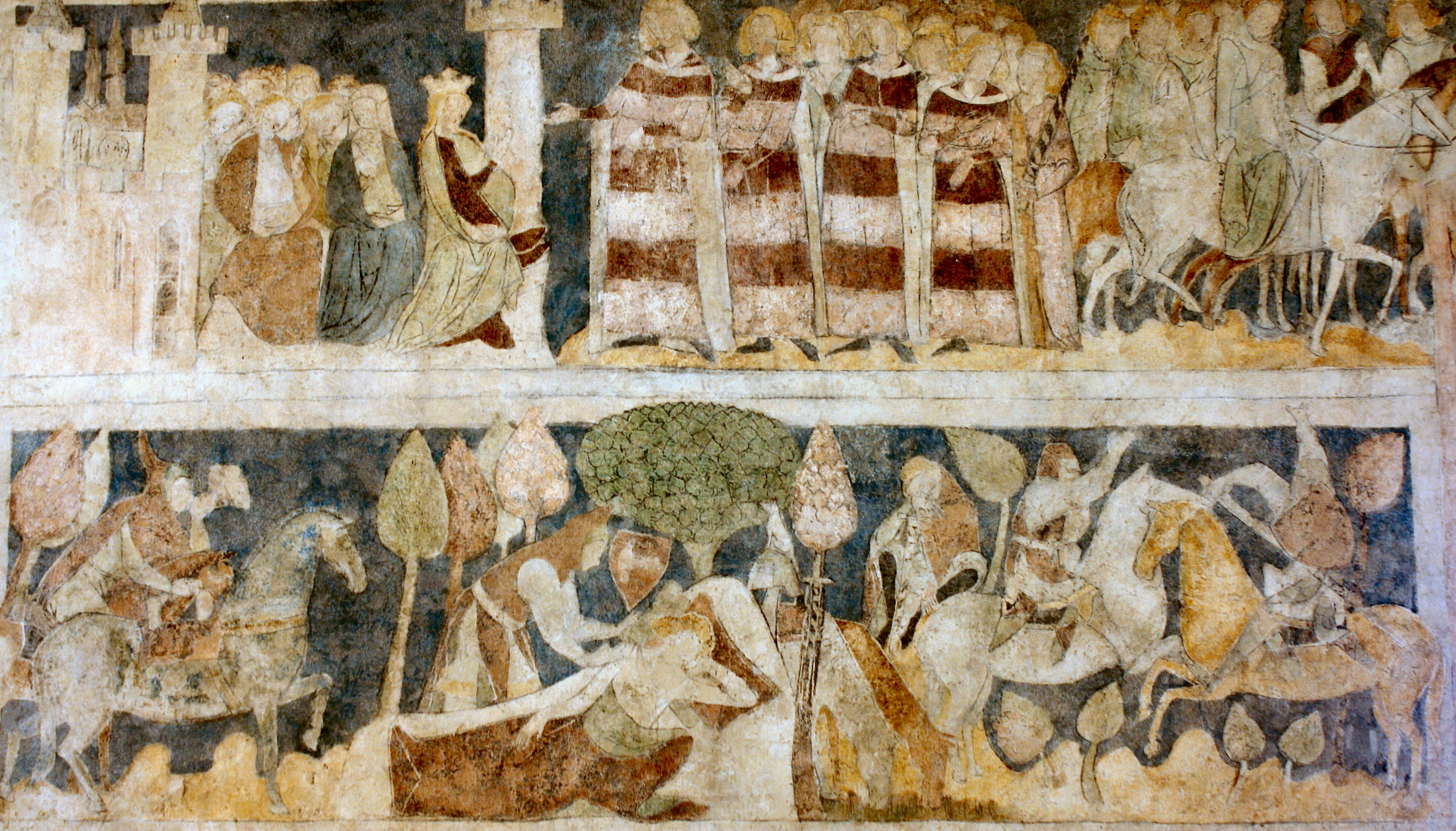
Scenes from the interlaced tale of the Queste del Saint Graal in a Polish 14th-century fresco

J. R. R. Tolkien's narrative interlacing in The Lord of the Rings, also called by the French term entrelacement, is an unusual and complex narrative structure, known from tapestry romances in medieval literature, that enables him to achieve a variety of literary effects. These include maintaining suspense, keeping the reader uncertain of what will happen and even of what is happening to other characters at the same time in the story; creating surprise and an ongoing feeling of bewilderment and disorientation. More subtly, the leapfrogging of the timeline in The Lord of the Rings by the different story threads allows Tolkien to make hidden connections that can only be grasped retrospectively, as the reader realises on reflection that certain events happened at the same time, and that these connections imply a contest of good and evil powers.

Interlacing and interconnections presented Peter Jackson with a complex challenge in translating the book to a narrative suitable for his The Lord of the Rings film trilogy. Scholars have noted that he used techniques such as intercutting, visual doubling, and voice-over to produce comparable emotional and thematic effects.

== Medieval entrelacement ==
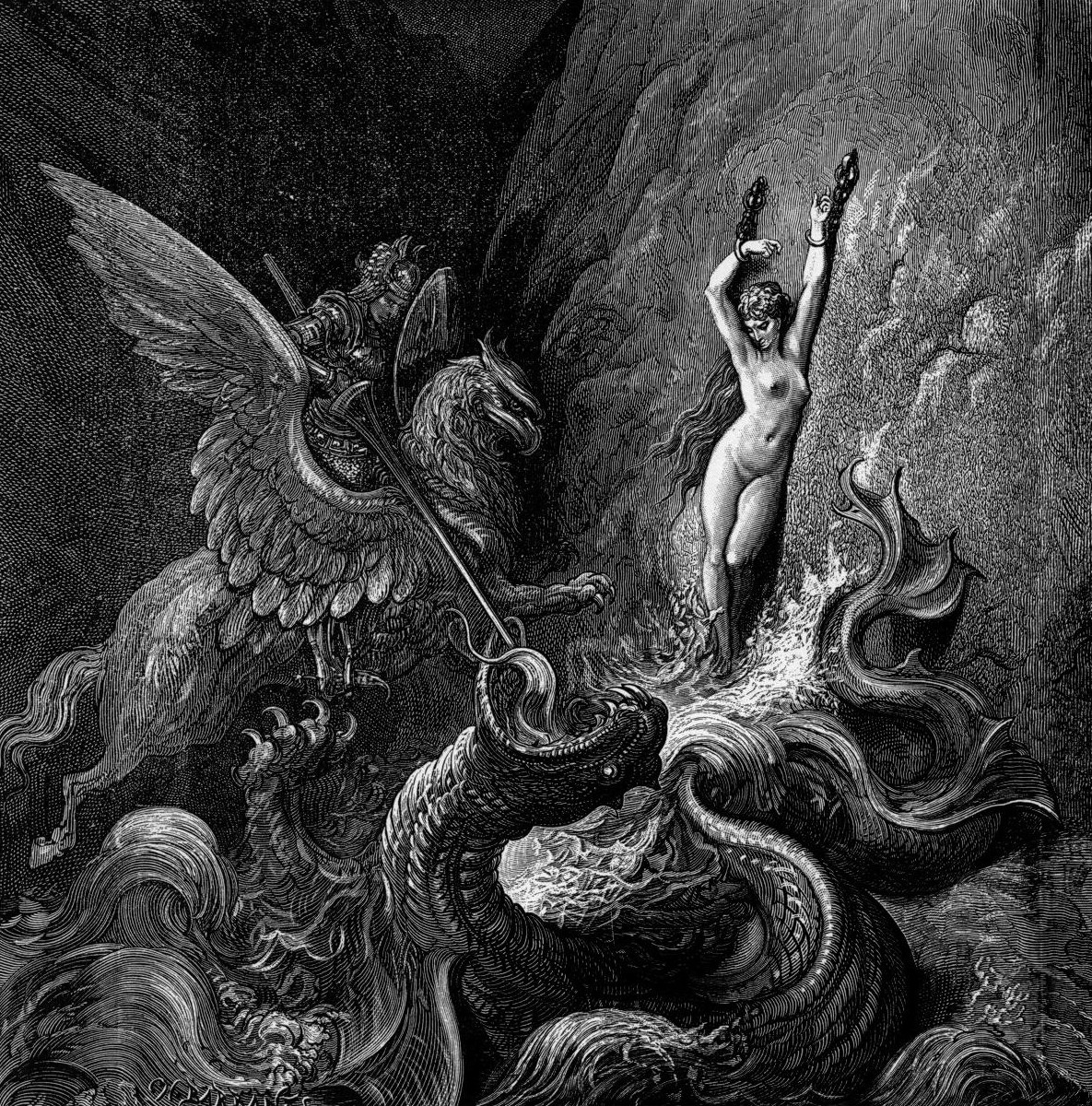
Tolkien disliked the French and Italian interlaced romances, like Orlando Furioso, but used their technique anyway. Illustration of Ruggiero rescuing Angelica for Orlando Furioso by Gustave Doré, 19th century

Interlace, known in the Middle Ages as entrelacement, was a narrative device developed in Medieval literature, especially the tapestry romances in France. Rather than seeking to make a story as clear as possible with a main plot and subsidiary storylines as in a modern novel, the interlaced medieval tale aimed to reflect the confusing flow of events that people perceive in the world. The Tolkien scholar Richard C. West gives as example the 13th century Queste del Saint Graal, where the holy grail is just one goal, while the knights Bors, Galahad, Gawain, and Lancelot all pursue their own adventures, for readers to compare and contrast. Outside France, a form of interlace is seen in Ovid's Metamorphoses from ancient Rome, in the Old English epic poem Beowulf (on which Tolkien was an expert, as in his lecture "Beowulf: The Monsters and the Critics"), and in the English poet Edmund Spenser's 1590 Faerie Queene.

The Tolkien scholar Tom Shippey comments that there is "a minor mystery" about Tolkien's use of this French Medieval literary device, as he favoured "northern" literature - Old English if possible, Old Norse otherwise - over French or later Italian epics like Ariosto's Orlando Furioso, which he notes was the model for Spenser's The Faerie Queene. The mystery stems from the fact that Tolkien hated Spenser's writing, and is recorded as saying that he hadn't read Ariosto "and wouldn't have liked him if I had". All the same, Shippey writes, Tolkien had read French interlaced romances when working on his edition of Sir Gawain; and his use of the technique is far more tightly structured than the Medieval romances.

== Narrative structure ==
=== Applying the medieval technique ===
The early reviewer William Blissett wrote in 1959, just a few years after the book was published, that The Lord of the Rings, given its medieval theme and structure, was "perhaps the last literary masterpiece of the Middle Ages." West comments that the remark is witty but not truly correct, as the novel addresses modern issues and is enjoyed by readers unfamiliar with medieval literature.

The interlace structure of Tolkien's work was described in 1967 by George H. Thomson, who wrote that in its subject, The Lord of the Rings was "an anatomy of [Medieval] romance themes", and in its structure no less ambitious, since

it follows the traditional Medieval-Renaissance pattern of the tapestry romance ... a series of interwoven stories each of which is picked up or dropped as occasion and suspense require ... This complex and highly sophisticated type of narrative has been out of fashion for a long time.

All the same, according to John R. Holmes, West's 1975 analysis, which focussed specifically on the novel's interlace structure, "remains the definitive study". Holmes states that Tolkien "uses this medieval technique in a decidedly modern way, closer to [Virginia] Woolf and [William] Faulkner than to Thomas Mallory [in his Le Morte D'Arthur] or Chrétien de Troyes".

The story of The Lord of the Rings is, West writes, simple enough: the Hobbit Frodo has to take the enemy Sauron's One Ring to where it was made, the fiery Mount Doom, in Sauron's dark land of Mordor, the only place where it can be destroyed. But, he adds, this quest "naturally lies interwoven into the lives and fates of other persons and peoples". The quest is, in particular, intertwined with the War of the Ring, which brings all the free peoples of Middle-earth into conflict with Sauron. Tolkien uses the medieval technique of interlacing to create a modern tale, unique for its "pervasive sense of history", its numerous invented languages, its abundant use of poetry, its deep roots in Tolkien's professional knowledge of philology, history, and Christianity, as much as its use of interlace.

=== Interwoven narratives ===
Tolkien structured the novel as six "books", that the publisher chose to print as three volumes. The first two books are almost single-threaded, as they follow Frodo from his home in the Shire with the other Hobbits to Rivendell, and then south as the nine companions of the Fellowship of the Ring, through Moria and Lothlorien to the River Anduin. From book 3, interlacing begins in earnest, as the Fellowship is broken, and the different groups pursue their own quests. The main quest is not forwarded at all in book 3; conversely, the other quests are not progressed in book 4 as Frodo and Sam continue their dangerous journey towards Mordor. Book 5 again says nothing of Frodo and Sam, but interweaves the narratives of the Hobbits Merry and Pippin with that of the Man Aragorn and his friends the Elf Legolas and the Dwarf Gimli. Book 6 recounts how Frodo and Sam completed their quest, and brings all the friends together. The Hobbits return home and scour the Shire of enemies. The timeline is more complex than this would suggest, as the books do not end with the characters synchronised; instead, the narrative repeatedly leapfrogs, so that sometimes one group is ahead in time, sometimes another. West and Shippey point out that these are just the major interlacings; many smaller-scale interlacings occur as the characters travel through Middle-earth and the story.

Major interlacings of The Lord of the Rings across its 6 "books", with their original titles, showing contrasts and parallels
Character	1 The First Journey		2 The Journey of the Nine Companions		3 The Treason of Isengard	4 The Journey of the Ring-bearers	5 The War of the Ring	6 The end of the Third Age		
Frodo, Sam	travel to Bree	travel to Rivendell	the 9 meet up, go south			travel towards Mordor		travel to Mount Doom	the friends meet again	Hobbits scour the Shire
Merry	travel to Bree	travel to Rivendell	the 9 meet up, go south		awaken the Ents to Isengard		swears fealty to Theoden; Battle of the Pelennor Fields		the friends meet again	Hobbits scour the Shire
Pippin	travel to Bree	travel to Rivendell	the 9 meet up, go south		awaken the Ents to Isengard		swears fealty to Denethor	Battle of the Morannon	the friends meet again	Hobbits scour the Shire
Aragorn	meets the Hobbits	travel to Rivendell	the 9 meet up, go south		travel to Rohan; Battle of Helm's Deep		Battle of the Pelennor Fields	Battle of the Morannon	the friends meet again	
Legolas, Gimli			the 9 meet up, go south		travel to Rohan; Battle of Helm's Deep		Battle of the Pelennor Fields	Battle of the Morannon	the friends meet again	
Gandalf	advises Frodo, hurries off		the 9 meet up, go south	dies in Moria	reappears; awakens Rohan to Isengard		alerts allies	Battle of the Morannon	the friends meet again	
Boromir			the 9 meet up, go south	dies at Parth Galen						
Gollum			(glimpsed in pursuit)			pursues Frodo and the Ring		pursues Frodo; destroys Ring, himself		

== Effects ==
The effects of the interlace structure of The Lord of the Rings range from bold to subtle.

=== Bewilderment, suspense, and surprise ===
Interlacing allowed Tolkien to weave an elaborately intricate story, presented through the eyes of the Hobbit protagonists, "underscoring [their] frequent bewilderment and disorientation". Most directly, this is achieved by letting the reader know no more than what one Hobbit sees as he struggles forwards, not knowing what lies ahead, where his friends are, or whether the quest has already failed. The bewilderment of the reader is minimised by the use of synchronising 'narrative landmarks', such as the brooch dropped by Pippin and discovered by Aragorn, and by having different characters observe the same event, such as a full moon, at different points in the narrative.

Equally, interlacing enables Tolkien to create suspense and "cliffhanger" section endings, as at the end of book 5 when Pippin falls under the Troll he has killed; the denouement is by means of story elements not introduced until later. It allows the Ents and Huorns to appear suddenly and decisively in a eucatastrophe on the battlefield of Helm's Deep; and readers share the characters' shock and bewilderment when the Mouth of Sauron shows Frodo's mithril mail-shirt before the Battle of the Morannon; a similar image is presented in Jackson's film, but viewers there know that Frodo is alive, so the effect is altogether different.

=== Naturalness and interconnectedness ===
West writes that "even a reader unconcerned with literary form or structure must notice, at least unconsciously, the apparently meandering manner of the plot". Things happen in the familiar way that "things seem to happen in our own lives", where "casual collisions of disparate people and events ... knit the fabric of the story". West illustrates this by examining Merry and Pippin's meeting with the Ents. This causes the Ents to overthrow their enemy Saruman, who was also the enemy of the kingdom of Rohan. This frees up Rohan to go to the aid of Gondor in their war with Sauron. The two Hobbits would never have met the Ents unless Saruman's Orcs had captured them. The Hobbits would not have escaped the Orcs unless Éomer's band of Riders of Rohan, disobeying orders from the King, had hunted the Orc intruders down. West states that each group and character has their own motivation, but their stories interact. It feels natural, and may appear "loose", but "everything is interconnected."

=== Providence and luck ===
More subtly, the leapfrogging of the timeline by the different story threads allows Tolkien to make hidden connections that can only be grasped retrospectively, as the reader realises on reflection that certain events happened at the same time. Shippey gives as an instance the moment when Frodo sits on Amon Hen, the Seat of Seeing, puts on the One Ring, and feels the Eye of Sauron pressing towards him; at the same time, Frodo hears a voice urging him to take the Ring off, giving him just enough time to make up his mind and save the quest by complying. Interlace, West notes, can "show purpose or pattern behind change". This can appear, Shippey writes, as luck, where in daily life it is uncertain whether this is "something completely humdrum and practical or something mysterious and supernatural", just like the Old English word used for the same purpose in Beowulf, wyrd.

=== Depth and openendedness ===
The wealth of detail in the novel, and the way that events mutually interact, helps to create both an impression of depth and a feeling of solidity; the imaginary world comes to seem real. Further, West writes, the evident sense that the novel is a part of an immense mythology, encouraged both by mentions of ancient events in the text and by the extensive appendices (which cover Kings and Rulers, Chronology, Family Trees, Calendars, Writing and Spelling, and the Languages of Middle-earth), creates in the reader's mind a feeling of openendedness, "whereby the reader has the impression that the story has an existence outside the confines of the book and that the author could have begun earlier or ended later, if he chose". The appendices indeed supply details of events long before the War of the Ring, what else occurred in Middle-earth at the same time, and what happened to the protagonists after the period described in the text. West notes, too, that openendedness is actually described in Frodo and Sam's conversation on the stairs of Cirith Ungol, the dangerous pass into Mordor. [Sam:] "'Why, to think of it, we're in the same tale still! Don't the great tales never end?' 'No, they never end as tales', said Frodo. 'But the people in them come, and go when their part's ended. Our part will end later—or sooner'". The Lord of the Rings was not, West writes, the last literary masterpiece of the Middle Ages, but Tolkien's instinct was right that medieval interlacing would work for his "modern masterpiece".

== Translation to film ==
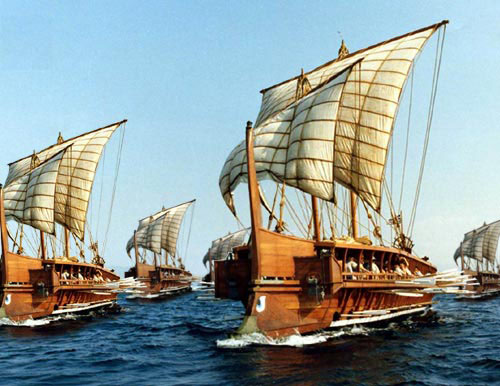
Aragorn's unexpected arrival in the captured Corsairs of Umbar's ships (like galleys, shown) is intercut in Jackson's film with Éowyn's desperate battle against the Witch-king to create, by quite different means, a Tolkienesque eucatastrophe.

Peter Jackson and his scriptwriters chose to flatten out the book's complex interlacing and back-and-forth timeline to create a much more direct narrative suitable for his The Lord of the Rings film trilogy. The scholars of English literature E. L. Risden and Yvette Kisor studied how Jackson had achieved this. Risden analysed how Jackson had made the Ring central, selecting a storytelling approach to provide "compelling progress with as few asides as possible". Kisor examined how Jackson had used a combination of film techniques to mimic the effect of interlacing, and importantly to preserve the interconnections between related storylines within Tolkien's narrative; those techniques included intercutting, visual doubling, and voice-over. Kisor concluded, unlike some Tolkien scholars, that Jackson had succeeded in producing comparable effects in "emotional and thematic content" and so in remaining true to the book.

The scholar Emily Auger writes that far from removing interlacing, the film, especially in its extended DVD versions, uses "specifically filmic variations of Tolkien's interlace", namely intercutting, to amplify the narrative and "dramatis[e] its status as myth". She lists over 50 scenes where various forms of interlacing occur. Further, she detects what she calls all three types of narrative interlace used by Tolkien in Alan Lee's illustrations for the book; these are structural interlace (achronological order), stylistic interlace (restatement of themes), and pictorial interlace (characters and their environment depicted as if the outer was a projection of the inner).

== Sources ==
- Auger, Emily E. (2008). "The Lord of the Rings' Interlace: Tolkien's Narrative and Lee's Illustrations". Journal of the Fantastic in the Arts. 19 (1): 70–93, 155.
- Auger, Emily E. (2011). "The Lord of the Rings' Interlace: The Adaptation to Film,"". Mythlore. 30 (1). Article 9, pages 143–162.
- Blissett, William (1959). "Despot of the Rings". South Atlantic Quarterly (58): 449.
- Bogstad, Janice M.; Kaveny, Philip E., eds. (2011). "Introduction". Picturing Tolkien: Essays on Peter Jackson's 'The Lord of the Rings' Film Trilogy. McFarland. ISBN 978-0-7864-8473-7.
- Holmes, John R. (2014). "The Lord of the Rings". In Lee, Stuart D. (ed.). A Companion to J. R. R. Tolkien. Wiley-Blackwell. pp. 133–145. ISBN 978-0-4706-5982-3.
- Kisor, Yvette (2011). "Making the Connection on Page and Screen in Tolkien's and Jackson's The Lord of the Rings". In Bogstad, Janice M.; Kaveny, Philip E. (eds.). Picturing Tolkien. McFarland. pp. 102–115. ISBN 978-0-7864-8473-7.
- Leyerle, John (1991). "The Interlace Structure of Beowulf". In Fulk, Robert Dennis (ed.). Interpretations of Beowulf: A Critical Anthology. Indiana University Press. pp. 146–167. ISBN 978-0-253-20639-8.
- Leibiger, Carol A. (2012). "[Review] Picturing Tolkien: Essays on Peter Jackson's The Lord of the Rings Film Trilogy by Janice M. Bogstad, Philip E. Kaveny". Journal of the Fantastic in the Arts. 23 (3): 517–521. JSTOR 24353098.
- Risden, E. L. (2011). "Tolkien's Resistance to Linearity: Narrating The Lord of the Rings in Fiction and Film". In Bogstad, Janice M.; Kaveny, Philip E. (eds.). Picturing Tolkien. McFarland. pp. 70–83. ISBN 978-0-7864-8473-7.
- Seaman, Gerald (2013) [2007]. "Old French Literature". In Drout, Michael D. C. (ed.). J.R.R. Tolkien Encyclopedia. Routledge. p. 468. ISBN 978-0-415-86511-1.
- Shippey, Tom (2005) [1982]. The Road to Middle-Earth: How J. R. R. Tolkien Created a New Mythology (Third ed.). HarperCollins. ISBN 978-0-261-10275-0.
- Sturgis, Amy H. (2013) [2007]. "Lord of the Rings, The". In Drout, Michael D. C. (ed.). J.R.R. Tolkien Encyclopedia. Routledge. p. 389. ISBN 978-0-415-86511-1.
- Thomson, George H. (1967). "The Lord of the Rings: The Novel as Traditional Romance". Wisconsin Studies in Contemporary Literature. 8 (1): 43–59. doi:10.2307/1207129. JSTOR 1207129.
- Tolkien, J. R. R. (1954). The Two Towers. The Lord of the Rings. Boston: Houghton Mifflin. OCLC 1042159111.
- Tolkien, J. R. R. (1955). The Return of the King. The Lord of the Rings. Boston: Houghton Mifflin. OCLC 519647821.
- Tolkien, John Ronald Reuel (1997) [1958]. Beowulf: The Monsters and the Critics and other essays. London: HarperCollins.
- West, Richard C. (1975). "The Interlace Structure of The Lord of the Rings". In Jared Lobdell (ed.). A Tolkien Compass. Open Court. pp. 77–94. ISBN 0-87548-303-8.
