= Amy H. Sturgis =

American author, speaker and scholar

Amy H. Sturgis (born 1971) is an American author, speaker and scholar of science fiction and fantasy studies and Native American studies. She earned her Ph.D. in intellectual history from Vanderbilt University, served on the advisory board of Mythopoeic Press, and contributed to the Hugo Award-winning StarShipSofa podcast and the Liberty and Power group weblog. She served as adjunct instructor at Lenoir-Rhyne University in Hickory, North Carolina, before becoming a professor at Belmont University in Nashville, Tennessee.

Sturgis is author of four books on U.S. presidential history and Native American studies (Presidents from Washington through Monroe, Presidents from Hayes through McKinley, The Trail of Tears and Indian Removal and Tecumseh: A Biography), five edited works on science fiction and fantasy (The Intersection of Fantasy and Native America: From H.P. Lovecraft to Leslie Marmon Silko, The Magic Ring, Past Watchful Dragons: Fantasy and Faith in the World of C.S. Lewis, The Magic Goblet, and The Magic Ring: Deluxe Illustrated Edition), and other scholarly and mainstream book chapters, articles and presentations. In 2006, she was awarded the Imperishable Flame Award for Achievement in Tolkien/Inklings Scholarship.

She contributes regular "Looking Back on Genre History" features to and narrates contemporary science fiction stories for the UK-based podcast StarShipSofa. In both 2009 and 2011, she received the Sofanaut Award in Podcasting for Best Fact Article Contributor. In 2010, it became the first podcast to win a Hugo Award.

In 2012, Sturgis was featured in a series of documentary short films produced by Ozymandius Media for the Institute for Humane Studies.

She has been interviewed on science fiction and fantasy topics by organizations including NPR.
