= Richard C. West =

American librarian and Tolkien scholar (1944–2020)

Richard C. West in 2013, working in Marquette University's Tolkien Archive

Richard Carroll West (August 13, 1944 – November 29, 2020) was an American librarian and one of the first Tolkien scholars. He is best known for his 1975 essay on the interlace structure of The Lord of the Rings, for which he won the 1976 Mythopoeic Scholarship Award for Inkling Studies.

== Biography ==
Richard Carroll West was born on August 13, 1944. He was educated at the University of Wisconsin-Madison. He began studying J. R. R. Tolkien's Middle-earth legendarium in 1968, visiting the Tolkien archives at Marquette University in Milwaukee, Wisconsin many times from then for some 45 years. He co-founded the University of Wisconsin Tolkien Society in 1966, and served as editor for its journal, Orcrist. He worked for many years as serials and technical services librarian at the University of Wisconsin-Madison, alongside his Tolkien studies.

West was part of the group of science fiction fans and scholars who founded WisCon, the first feminist science fiction convention, held in February of 1977. He married Harriet Perri Corrick, a fellow fan, in 1977. He died from COVID-19 in Madison, Wisconsin, on November 29, 2020, where he was being treated for a chronic illness.

== Awards and distinctions ==
- 1976 Mythopoeic Scholarship Award for Inkling Studies
- 2014 Scholar Guest of Honor at Mythcon 45

== Reception ==
Jared Lobdell, in the J.R.R. Tolkien Encyclopedia, wrote that "at least one observer has suggested that the best single essay in Tolkien criticism is Richard C. West's 1975 "The Interlace Structure of The Lord of the Rings". He noted that at the time West was studying under "the expert in entrelacement", Eugène Vinaver. Lobdell describes the essay as scholarly form-criticism, so useful that it does not belong to the category of [negative] "criticism" as commonly understood. The Tolkien scholar Dimitra Fimi similarly described West's article on interlacing as a "key article" in Tolkien scholarship. Librarian and Tolkien scholar David Bratman described it as "one of the pioneering studies in Tolkien's use of medieval literary techniques".

Another well-known Tolkien scholar, John D. Rateliff, called him "one of the best of the best of Tolkien scholars." A checklist of works by West was published in 2005 by Douglas A. Anderson.

== Works ==
=== Books ===
- Tolkien Criticism: An Annotated Checklist (Kent State University Press, first edition 1970, updated second edition 1981)

=== Book chapters and articles ===
- "The Interlace Structure of The Lord of the Rings" in A Tolkien Compass (Open Court, 1975, ed. Jared Lobdell)
- "Setting the Rocket Off in Story: The Kalevala as the Germ of Tolkien's Legendarium" in Tolkien and the Invention of Myth: A Reader (University Press of Kentucky, 2004)
- "A Tolkien Checklist: Selected Criticism 1981-2004", Modern Fiction Studies 40:4 (2004)
- "'And She Named Her Own Name': Being True To One's Word in Tolkien's Middle-earth", Tolkien Studies 2 (2005)
- "Her Choice Was Made and Her Doom Appointed" in The Lord of the Rings, 1954-2004: Scholarship in Honor of Richard E. Blackwelder (Marquette University Press, 2006)
- "Neither the Shadow nor the Twilight: The Love Story of Aragorn and Arwen in Literature and Film" in Picturing Tolkien: Essays on Peter Jackson's The Lord of the Rings Film Trilogy (McFarland & Company, 2011)
- "Where Fantasy Fits: The Importance of Being Tolkien", Mythlore 33:1, article 2 (2014)

West contributed chapters to the following scholarly books:

- "Túrin's Ofermod: An Old English Theme in the Development of the Story of Túrin" in Tolkien's Legendarium: Essays on The History of Middle-earth (Greenwood Press, 2000)
- "Real-World Myth in a Secondary World: Mythological Aspects in the Story of Beren and Lúthien" in Tolkien the Medievalist (Routledge, 2003)
- "'Lack of Counsel Not of Courage': J.R.R. Tolkien's Critique of the Heroic Ethos in The Children of Húrin" in Tolkien in the New Century: Essays in Honor of Tom Shippey (McFarland & Company, 2014)
- "Canute and Beorhtnoth" in A Wilderness of Dragons: Essays in Honor of Verlyn Flieger (The Gabbro Head Press, 2018)
