= Randel Helms =

Literature professor

Randel McCraw Helms, also known as Loyce Helms (born November 16, 1942, in Montgomery, Alabama) is an American professor of English literature, a writer on J. R. R. Tolkien and critical writer on the Bible.

== Biography ==
Helms studied at University of California, Riverside, B.A. 1964, University of Washington, Ph.D. 1968, then taught from 1968 at the University of California as assistant professor of English, before becoming professor at the Department of English, Arizona State University. In 2007 he established the Randel and Susan McCraw Helms Homecoming Writing Contest for undergraduate students.

=== Writings on William Blake ===
As Loyce Randel Helms he wrote his dissertation on William Blake: Artful Thunder: a Literary Study of Prophecy He has also written on Blake's "Everlasting Gospel" (1980).

=== Writings on Tolkien ===
Helms's many writings on J. R. R. Tolkien include journal articles on topics such as the structure and aesthetics of The Lord of the Rings, and the books Tolkien's World (Houghton Mifflin, 1974) and Tolkien and the Silmarils (Houghton Mifflin, 1981). Emily Auger, reviewing that book in Journal of the Fantastic in the Arts, calls it "pioneering" and writes that it identifies similarities between The Silmarillion and the Bible, finding the Old Testament especially important.

=== Biblical criticism ===
Helms has written a series of books using Higher Criticism to analyze the Bible. In Gospel Fictions, Helms argues that the Gospel writers used the Old Testament as a source of material to build up fictional details about events surrounding Jesus. He also wrote Who wrote the Gospels? (1997) and The Bible against itself (2006) on similar themes.
