= Colin Manlove =

British literary critic (1942–2020)

2017

Colin Nicholas Manlove (4 May 1942 in Falkirk – 1 June 2020) was a literary critic with a particular interest in fantasy. Modern Fantasy: Five Studies (1975, published as by C. N. Manlove), which considers at length works by Charles Kingsley, George MacDonald, C. S. Lewis, J. R. R. Tolkien and Mervyn Peake, was written at a time when "no serious study of the subject [of fantasy literature] has appeared". In it he posits a definition of fantasy as:

A fiction evoking wonder and containing a substantial and irreducible element of supernatural or impossible worlds, beings or objects with which the mortal characters in the story or the readers become on at least partly familiar terms.

His conclusion, however, is negative: each of the five major writers whose work he considered failed to sustain their original vision.

He taught English Literature at the University of Edinburgh from 1967 until retiring as a reader in 1993.

== Criticism ==
- Modern Fantasy: Five Studies (1975)
- Literature and Reality 1600-1800 (1978)
- The Gap in Shakespeare: The Motif of Division from Richard II to The Tempest (1981)
- The Impulse of Fantasy Literature (1983)
- Science Fiction: Ten Explorations (1986)
- C S Lewis: His Literary Achievement (1987) (updated ed.2010)
- Critical Thinking: A Guide to Interpreting Literary Texts (1989)
- Christian Fantasy: From 1200 to the Present (1992)
- The Chronicles of Narnia: The Patterning of a Fantastic World (1993) - Twayne's Masterwork Studies (#127)
- Scottish Fantasy Literature: A Critical Survey (1994)
- The Fantasy Literature of England (1999)
- From Alice to Harry Potter: Children's Fantasy in England (2003)
- The Order of Harry Potter: Literary Skill in the Hogwarts Epic (2010)
- Scotland's Forgotten Treasure: the Visionary Romances of George MacDonald (2016)
- George MacDonald's Children's Fantasies and the Divine Imagination (2019)

== Anthologies ==
- An Anthology of Scottish Fantasy Literature (1996)
