= Jared Lobdell =

American historian

Jared Lobdell

Jared Charles Lobdell (29 November 1937 – 22 March 2019) was an American author and one of the first Tolkien scholars. He is best known for some thirty academic books on American history and the Inklings including J. R. R. Tolkien, C. S. Lewis, and Charles Williams.

== Biography ==
Jared Lobdell was born to Charles and Jane Elizabeth (Hopkins) Lobdell in New York. He was educated at Yale University. He wrote many books on aspects of American history, and on each of the three major Inklings, the Oxford literary society centred on C. S. Lewis, with his friends J. R. R. Tolkien and Charles Williams. He died at Elizabethtown, Pennsylvania.

=== Tolkien scholarship ===
Lobdell's 1975 edited collection, A Tolkien Compass, was one of the first books of Tolkien scholarship to be published. at a time when "in the United Kingdom at least, professing an interest in Tolkien was almost certain death for any hopeful candidate seeking entrance to a department of English". Shippey described the essays as written in the "Age of Innocence" before Tolkien studies became professionalised, and as such offering "freshness, candor, and a sense of historical depth" that cannot be repeated. He noted that some of the early predictions were wrong – for instance, Tolkien had not written much of The Lord of the Rings before the Second World War – but many others have been substantiated, such as Richard C. West's account of Tolkien's use of medieval-style interlacing as a narrative structure.

== Works ==
=== Books ===
Lobdell wrote some 30 non-fiction books, including:

- A Tolkien Compass (editor) (Open Court, 1975)
- England and Always: Tolkien's World of the Rings (Eerdmans, 1981)
- The Detective Fiction Reviews of Charles Williams, 1930-1935 (McFarland, 2003)
- The World of the Rings: Language, Religion, and Adventure in Tolkien (Open Court, 2004) — an expansion of England and Always
- The Scientifiction Novels of C. S. Lewis: Space and Time in the Ransom Stories (McFarland, 2004)
- The Rise of Tolkienian Fantasy (Open Court, 2005)
- Eight Children in Narnia: The Making of a Children's Story (Open Court, 2016)

=== Encyclopedia entries ===
Lobdell wrote 23 of the essays in the 2006 J.R.R. Tolkien Encyclopedia: Scholarship and Critical Assessment including 'Angels', 'Dreams', 'England, Twentieth Century', and 'Sauron'.

=== Articles ===
Among Lobdell's many scholarly articles are:

- "Words That Sound like Castles" (Rally, August, 1966)
- "A Medieval Proverb in The Lord of the Rings" (American Notes and Queries Supplement I, 1978)
- "Mr. Bliss: Notes on the Manuscript and Story" (Selections from the Marquette J.R.R. Tolkien Collection, 1987)
- "C.S. Lewis's Ransom Stories and Their Eighteenth-Century Ancestry" (Word and Story in C.S. Lewis, 1991)
- "Ymagynatyf and J.R.R. Tolkien's Roman Catholicism, Catholic Theology, Religion in The Lord of the Rings" (Light Beyond All Shadow: Religious Experience in Tolkien's Work, 2011)
- "Humour, Comedy, the Comic, Comicality, Puns, Wordplay, 'Fantastication', and 'English Humour' in and around Tolkien and His Work, and among the Inklings" (Laughter in Middle-earth, 2016)
