= Rose Zimbardo =

American academic

- Born: Rose E. Abdelnour; May 29, 1932; Brooklyn, New York, U.S.
- Died: October 25, 2015 (aged 83)
- Education: Brooklyn College; Yale University (PhD)
- Spouse(s): Philip Zimbardo (m. 1957; div. 1971) Martin Stevens (m. 1974; died 2001)
- Children: 1

Rose Abdelnour Zimbardo (born Rose E. Abdelnour; May 29, 1932 – October 25, 2015) was an American professor of English literature. Her work covered such subjects as Shakespeare, Restoration drama, and the works of J. R. R. Tolkien. She was a pioneer in the academic study of Tolkien's works, and co-edited three collections with fellow Tolkien scholar Neil Isaacs: Tolkien and the Critics (University of Notre Dame Press, 1968); Tolkien: New Critical Perspectives (University Press of Kentucky, 1981); and Understanding The Lord of the Rings: The Best of Tolkien Criticism (Houghton Mifflin, 2004).

Zimbardo began her career in 1960 at the City College of New York. She later moved to the State University of New York at Stony Brook. At Stony Brook she was designated a Distinguished Teaching Professor in 1991. After she retired from Stony Brook, she took an adjunct position at the University of San Francisco.

== Personal life ==
She was born in Brooklyn, New York, to Albert and Angela Abdelnour. She graduated from Brooklyn College in 1956, then earned her master's degree from Yale University in 1957 and her doctorate, also from Yale, in 1960. In 1957 she married fellow Yale graduate student Philip Zimbardo. They had a son in 1962, and divorced in 1971. In 1974 she married her Stony Brook colleague Martin Stevens; they remained married until his death in 2001. She died on October 25, 2015.

== Selected works ==
- Wycherley's Drama: A Link in the Development of English Satire (Yale University Press, 1965)
- Critical Reviews of Paradise Lost, John Milton (Simon & Schuster, 1966)
- Tolkien and the Critics, co-edited with Neil D. Isaacs (University of Notre Dame Press, 1968)
- Twentieth Century Interpretations of Major Barbara: A Collection of Critical Essays (Prentice Hall, 1970)
- Tolkien: New Critical Perspectives, co-edited with Neil D. Isaacs (University Press of Kentucky, 1981)
- Across the Curriculum: Thinking, Reading, Writing, with Martin Stevens (Longman, 1985)
- A Mirror to Nature: Transformations in Drama and Aesthetics, 1660-1732 (University Press of Kentucky, 1986)
- At Zero Point: Discourse, Culture, and Satire in Restoration England (University Press of Kentucky, 1998)
- Understanding The Lord of the Rings: The Best of Tolkien Criticism, co-edited with Neil D. Isaacs (Houghton Mifflin, 2004)
- The Conceptual Design in Shakespeare's Comedies: An Analysis of Comic Form (Edwin Mellen Press, 2011)
