= Architecture in Middle-earth =

Theme in Tolkien's fantasy writings

The architecture in Middle-earth, J. R. R. Tolkien's fictional world, varies from the Hobbit-holes of the Shire, the tree-houses of Lothlórien and the wooden halls of Rohan to the stone dwellings and fortifications of Minas Tirith, capital of Gondor. Tolkien uses the architecture in each place, including its interior design, to provide clues to each people's character. The Hobbit Bilbo Baggins's cosy home, Bag End, described in his 1937 children's book The Hobbit, establishes the character of Hobbits as averse to travelling outside the Shire. In his fantasy novel The Lord of the Rings, Lothlórien demonstrates the close integration of the Elves with their natural environment. The King of Rohan's hall, Meduseld, indicates the Rohirrim's affinity with Anglo-Saxon culture, while Gondor's tall and beautiful stone architecture was described by Tolkien as "Byzantine". In contrast, the Dark Lord Sauron and the fallen Wizard Saruman's realms are damaged lands around tall dark towers.

Makers of films set in Middle-earth have developed or modified Tolkien's indications of architecture to convey their views of the various Middle-earth peoples and their cultures. Peter Jackson created an extensive set of the Shire with multiple Hobbit-holes, a mill, and a bridge in the New Zealand countryside, used in his films of both The Lord of the Rings and The Hobbit, and elaborate film sets of other places in Middle-earth using bigatures and computer animation. Scholars have admired his films' effective visual interpretation of Middle-earth settings. The production design of The Lord of the Rings: The Rings of Power has created architectures for places not seen in Jackson's films, such as Númenor and the Elvish realm of Lindon.

Tolkien's writings have spawned many imitators among fantasy authors, including of his medieval settings. Tolkien fans, too, have created a wide variety of materials and activities to immerse themselves in Middle-earth.

== J. R. R. Tolkien's vision ==
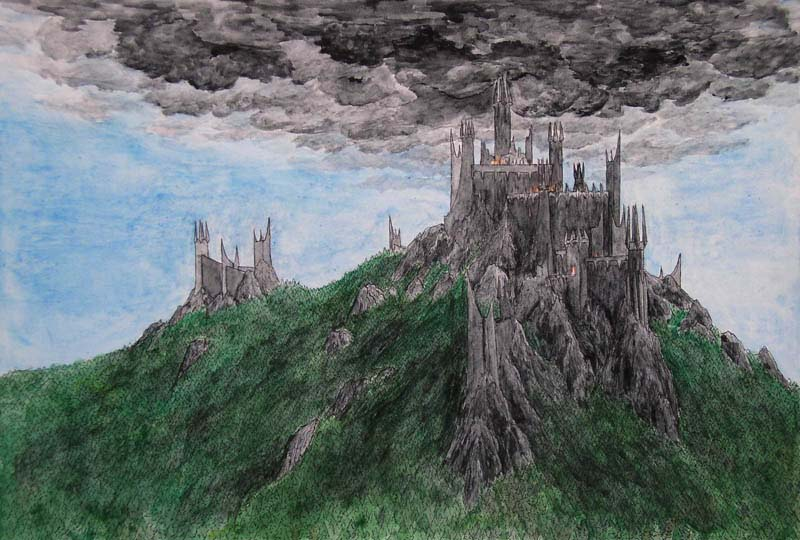
Setting-based fiction invites immersion and connection among its readers. A Tolkien fan's impression of Dol Guldur, a stronghold of the Necromancer

J. R. R. Tolkien was a medievalist and a philologist as well as an author. He speaks in his lecture "On Fairy-Stories" of sub-creation, making a secondary world that is in some sense true for the reader. The Tolkien scholar Johanna Brooke comments that architecture is part of the secondary world; the more unlike the primary world's the buildings are – and Hobbit-holes are clearly unlike – the harder it is for the author to create "the inner consistency of reality". She comments that architecture in The Hobbit and The Lord of the Rings serves to point up where cultures are similar and where they differ, emphasising the multiculturality of Middle-earth.

The fantasy author and scholar of literature Kim Wilkins describes Tolkien's work as "the beginning ... of popular fantasy fiction, ... spawn[ing] countless imitators" among fantasy authors, including its "alternative medieval Europe" setting. She argues that the architectural setting is "a privileged aspect" of fantasy. In her view, immersive fantasy with an "incredibly detailed world" is driven primarily by "the exposition and elaboration of the setting, from which characterisation and plots specific to the setting are then generated", rather than being driven by character or plot. She cites Tolkien's description of Minas Tirith's architecture as evidently medieval:

Then turning south again [Frodo] beheld Minas Tirith. Far away it seemed, and beautiful: white-walled, many-towered, proud and fair upon its mountain-seat; its battlements glittered with steel, and its turrets were bright with many banners. Hope leaped in his heart. (Note: Tolkien 1954, book 2 ch. 10, "The Breaking of the Fellowship")

She writes that Tolkien is here describing the city from a great distance, "zoom[ing] the reader out, suggesting the wide scope and large scale that are key pleasures of the genre." In addition, she states, Tolkien effectively creates an impression of "height and light": the city is tall, beautiful, and bright, suggesting the pride of the city and its people.

=== Hobbit-holes ===
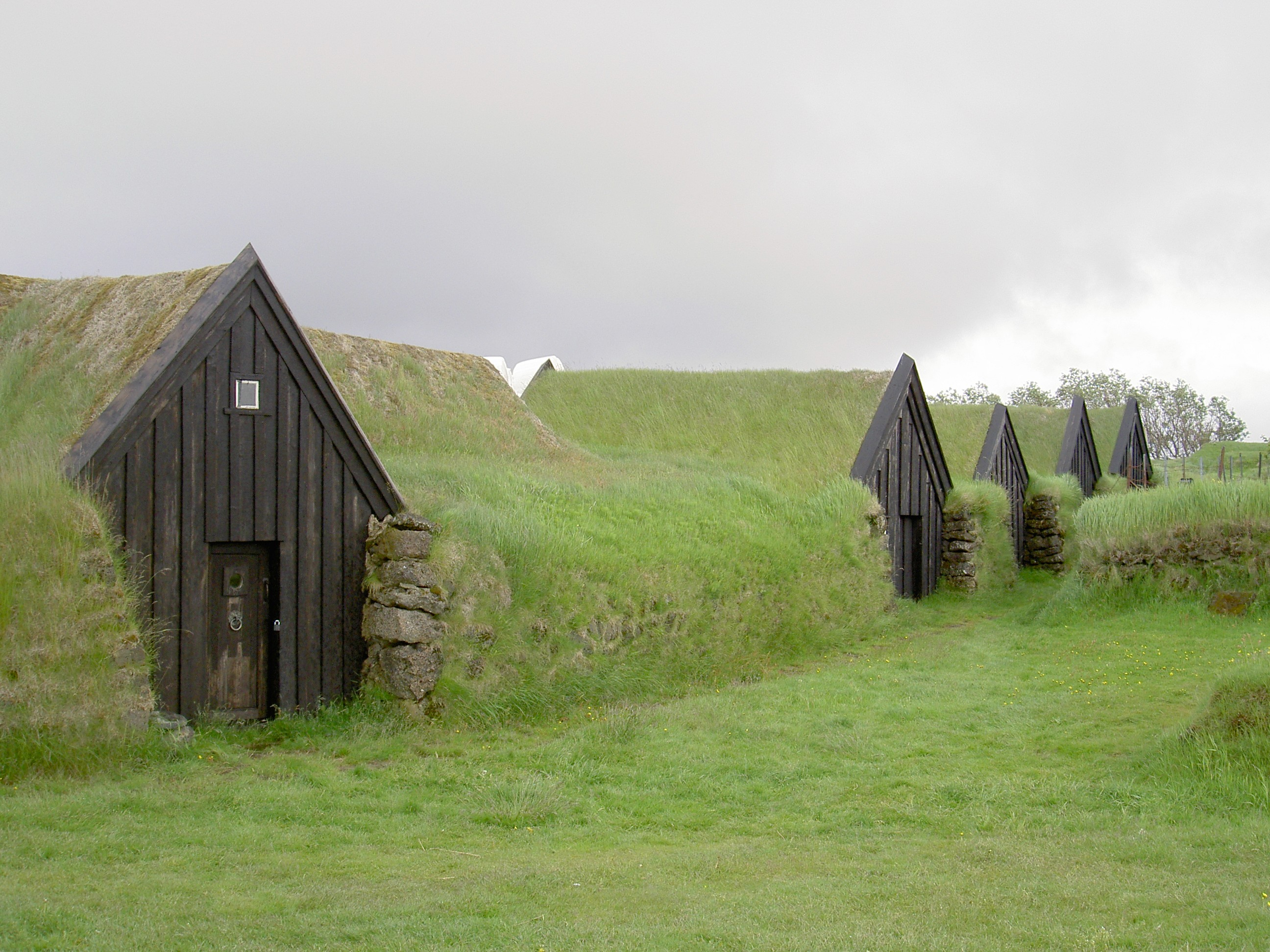
Turf-covered houses at Keldur, Iceland

The cartographer Karen Wynn Fonstad's plan of Bag End, showing her vision of its comfortable layout with many cellars and pantries, and multiple fireplaces and chimneys.

Tolkien made his Hobbits live in holes, though these quickly turn out to be comfortable, and in the case of Bag End actually highly desirable. Hobbit-holes range from the simple underground dwellings of the poor, with a door leading into a tunnel and perhaps a window or two, up to the large and elaborate Bag End with its multiple cellars, pantries, kitchen, dining room, parlour, study, and bedrooms, with several south-facing windows looking out of The Hill across the England-like Shire. Tolkien may have based his Hobbit-holes on Iceland's turf houses, such as those at Keldur. He makes Bag End in particular a place where, in the Tolkien scholar Thomas Honegger's words, "most readers feel severely tempted to put on their imaginary slippers and settle down to a piece of cake and some tea." Honegger argues that places have a critical role in The Lord of the Rings, and the function of the safe Hobbit-hole is to establish the character of the "hol-bytlan (hole-dwellers), in the first place stationary beings who have a deep-rooted aversion against travelling outside the Shire."

While Tolkien gave descriptions of Bag End and other Hobbit buildings, and made drawings and paintings of some of them, he left room for other people, including the cartographer Karen Wynn Fonstad, to fill in the details of the buildings' architecture, such as by drawing a plan of Bag End with its many rooms for food storage, preparation, and eating. She showed her vision of its comfortable layout with its cellars and pantries, complete with multiple fireplaces and chimneys, based on but going beyond the clues given by Tolkien in The Hobbit and The Lord of the Rings. Her plan makes Bag End some 130 feet (40 m) long and up to 50 feet (15 m) wide, cut into the Hill. Honegger writes that Fonstad's work has contributed substantially to giving Middle-earth an "independent existence".

=== Elvish dwellings ===
J. R. R. Tolkien's 1937 painting of Rivendell gives prominence to the house's setting.

Tolkien's 1937 painting Rivendell depicts the Elvish house in a mountainous setting with prominent cliffs. In that painting, and in sketches from different viewpoints, he shows the house, unfortified in its valley. It has a square tower with a hipped roof, beside a larger building with a pitched roof and a loggia with columns and sometimes gently curved arches; there are some outbuildings. In The Hobbit, Bilbo and the Dwarves lead their ponies down the steep path to the fast-flowing river and cross "a narrow bridge of stone without a parapet ... And so at last they all came to the Last Homely House, and found its doors flung wide." In The Lord of the Rings, Sam and Frodo experience a sizeable house, but again the outside, both the gardens and wild nature, is given prominence. The Hobbits walk "along several passages and down many steps and out into a high garden above the steep bank of the river. He found his friends sitting in a porch on the side of the house looking east. Shadows had fallen in the valley below, but there was still a light on the faces of the mountains far above. The air was warm. The sound of running and falling water was loud, and the evening was filled with a faint scent of trees and flowers, as if summer still lingered in Elrond's gardens." (Note: Tolkien 1954a, Book 2, ch. 1 "Many Meetings")

Matthew T. Dickerson writes that Elrond's house in the valley of Rivendell consistently represents a sanctuary, a place that felt like home, throughout Tolkien's legendarium.

'There lie the woods of Lothlórien!' said Legolas. 'That is the fairest of all the dwellings of my people. There are no trees like the trees of that land. For in the autumn their leaves fall not, but turn to gold. Not till the spring comes and the new green opens do they fall, and then the boughs are laden with yellow flowers; and the floor of the wood is golden, and golden is the roof, and its pillars are of silver, for the bark of the trees is smooth and grey. So still our songs in Mirkwood say.'

— from The Fellowship of the Ring, Book 2, Ch 6, "Lothlórien"

Lothlórien's city is Caras Galadhon (from galadh ("tree"). (Note: Tolkien 1954a, Book 2, ch. 8 "Farewell to Lórien") Founded by Amroth in the Third Age, deep in the forest, the city's dwellings were atop tall mallorn trees; the mallorn had been brought to that land by Galadriel. The city was "some ten miles" from the point where the rivers Silverlode and Anduin met, close to the eastern border of the realm. In the trees there were many tree-platforms, from simple guard-posts to elaborate dwellings. Stairways of ladders were built around the main trees, and at night the city was lit by "many lamps" - "green and gold and silver". (Note: Tolkien 1954a, Book 2, ch. 6 "Lothlórien") The city's entrance was on the southern side. (Note: Tolkien 1954a, Book 2, ch. 7 "The Mirror of Galadriel")

Brooke comments that in Lothlórien, Tolkien had worked in his personal concern for nature. Further, she suggests that Lothlórien embodies the Victorian era critic John Ruskin's principles of Gothic architecture. She argues that the centrality of the mallorn tree to the Elves makes architecture hard to distinguish from nature. Further, the colours of silver and gold in the hall of Galadriel and Celeborn recall both the silver-grey of the mallorn trunks and the circle of trees "arrayed in pale gold" in Lothlórien, and the Two Trees of Valinor, with Laurelin's golden fruit and Telperion's silver flower. This in turn, she writes, implies that the Elves of Lothlórien are wholly integrated with their forest environment. In Unfinished Tales, Tolkien speaks of the mallorn grove "carpeted and roofed with gold"; (Note: Tolkien 1980, "A Description of Númenor") Brooke writes that this mixes the lexical fields of architecture and nature description, revealing the intertwining of the two in the Elvish realm.

=== Dwarvish halls of stone ===
Tolkien's illustration of the Doors of Durin, with Sindarin inscription in Tengwar script.

[Gandalf:] 'I now know where we are. This must be ... the Chamber of Mazarbul; and the hall must be the twenty-first of the North-end. Therefore we should leave by the eastern arch of the hall, and bear right and south, and go downwards. The Twenty-first Hall should be on the Seventh Level, that is six above the level of the Gates.'

— from The Fellowship of the Ring, Book 2, Ch 5, "The Bridge of Khazad-dûm"

Tolkien depicted Moria, the central but lost capital of Middle-earth's Dwarves, as an enormous underground realm, without saying much about how it looked. He devoted considerable effort to depicting the Doors of Durin, Moria's western gate, creating both a large coloured pencil drawing of the gate's setting at the foot of blocky vertical cliffs beside the lake guarded by the Watcher in the Water, and a detailed finished ink illustration of the round-arched doors themselves, complete with Tengwar script and Dwarvish emblems.

Alan Lee went further into Moria to sketch the high halls of stone hollowed out by the Dwarves inside the Misty Mountains, with massive carved and patterned square columns supporting angled arches and soaring monolithic stone vaults.

=== Rohan's wooden hall ===
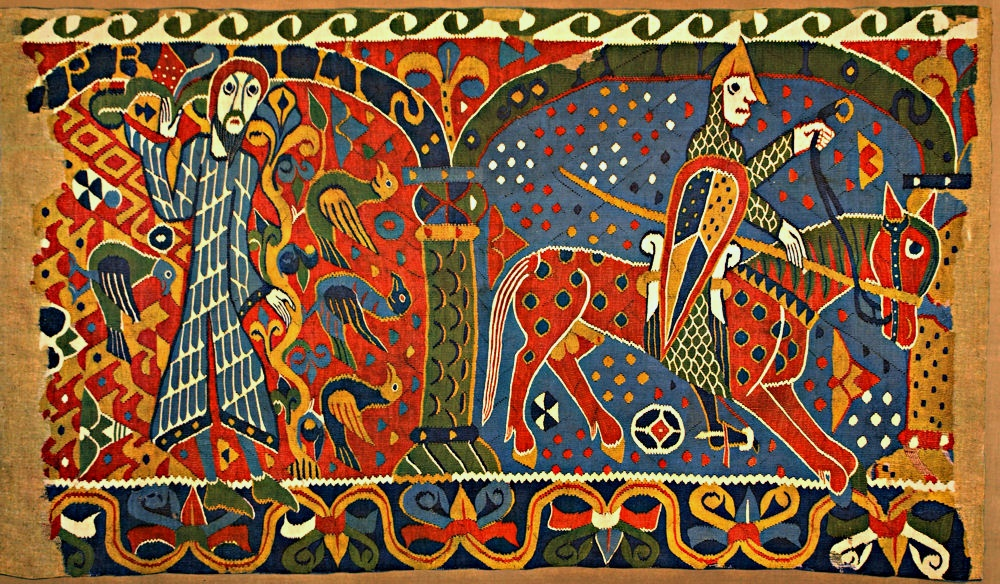
Meduseld had "many woven cloths" telling of "figures of ancient legend", (Note: Tolkien 1954, book 3 ch. 6 "The King of the Golden Hall".) like the Viking Baldishol Tapestry

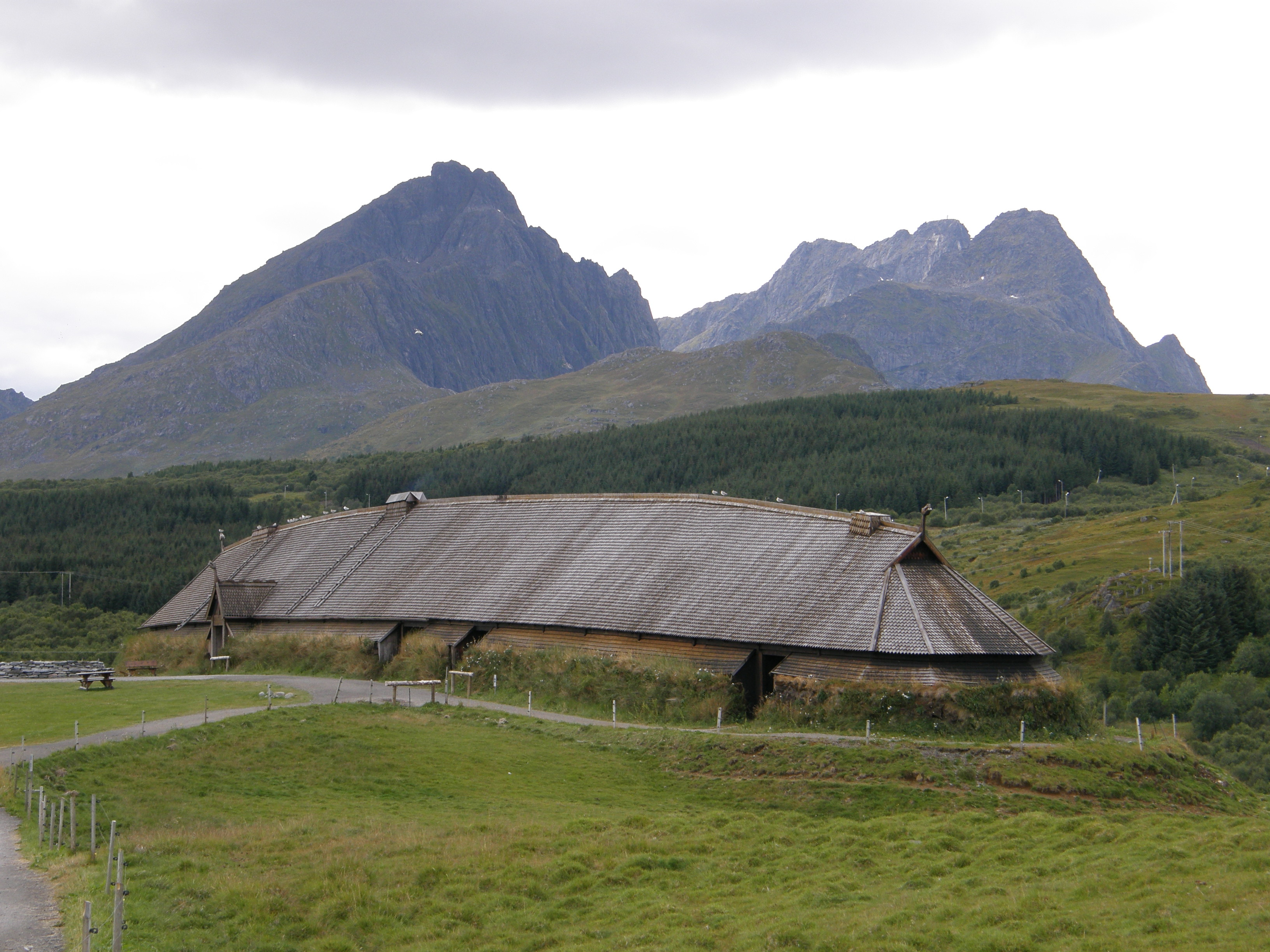
Mead hall at Borg, Norway

Meduseld, the Golden Hall of the Kings of Rohan, is in the centre of the town of Edoras at the top of the hill. "Meduseld", Old English for "mead hall", is meant to be a translation of an unknown Rohirric word with the same meaning. Meduseld is based on the mead hall Heorot in Beowulf; it is a large hall with a thatched roof that appears golden from far off. The walls are richly decorated with tapestries depicting the history and legends of the Rohirrim, and it serves as a house for the King and his kin, a meeting hall for the King and his advisors, and a gathering hall for ceremonies and festivities. Tolkien hints at the hall's heroic connotations by having Legolas describe Meduseld in a sentence that directly translates a line of Beowulf, "The light of it shines far over the land", representing líxte se léoma ofer landa fela.

Brooke comments that Meduseld represents "a more historical reworking of architecture", given its evident Anglo-Saxon roots, while Gondor's Minas Tirith suggests a "more classical legacy" from European history. The parallels do not imply identity: unlike the Anglo-Saxons, the society of Rohan is strongly centred on the horse, and the Rohirrim choose to fight on horseback.

=== Gondor's stone buildings ===
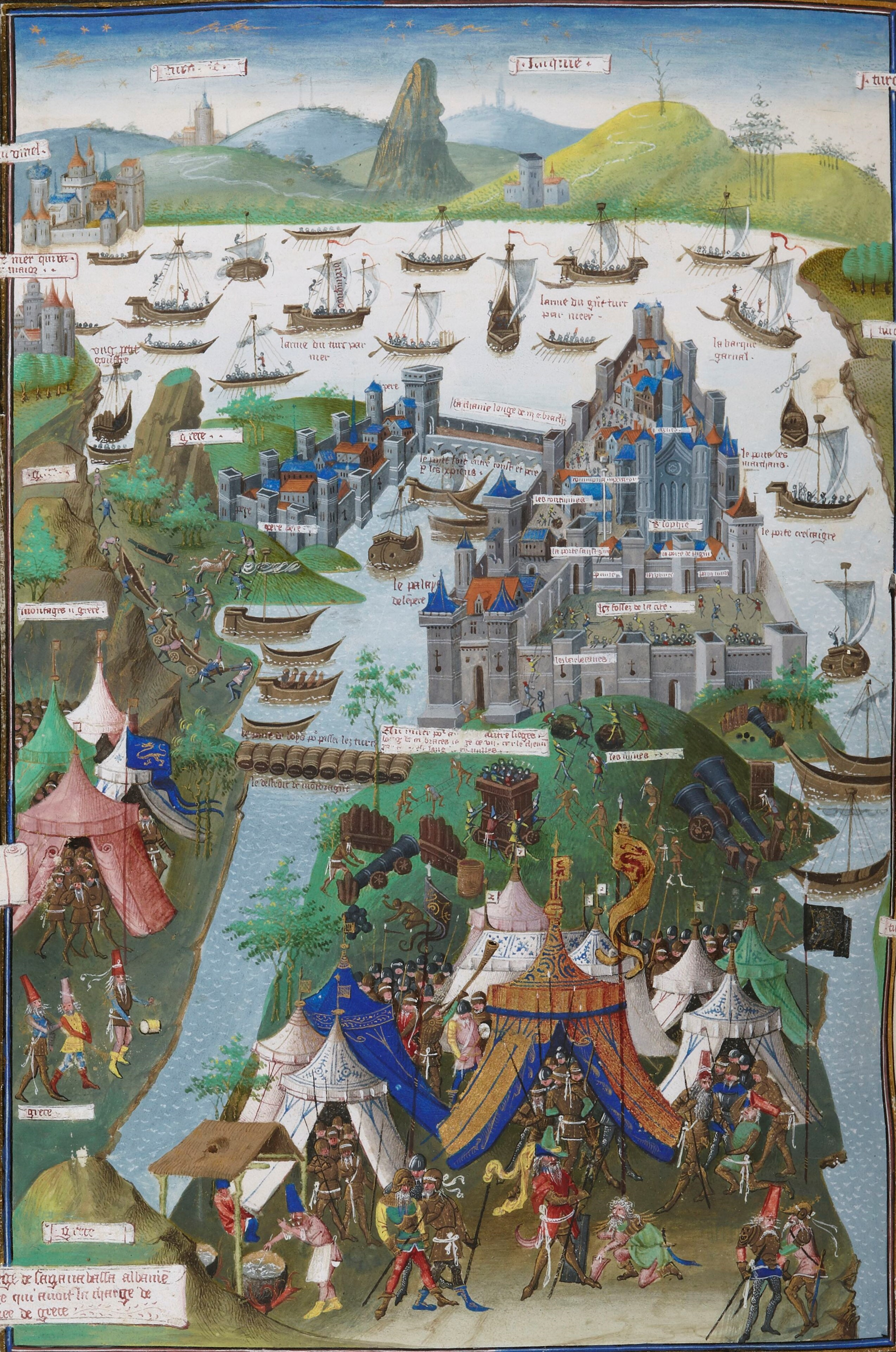
Tolkien called Minas Tirith a "Byzantine City" (Constantinople shown).

The capital city of Gondor was Minas Tirith. It had seven walls: each wall held a gate, and each gate faced a different direction from the next, facing alternately somewhat north or south. Each level was about 100 ft (30 m) higher than the one below it, and each surrounded by a high white stone wall, with the exception of the wall of the First Circle (the lowest level), which was black, built of the same material used for Orthanc. This outer wall was also the tallest, longest and strongest of the city's seven walls; it was vulnerable only to earthquakes capable of rending the ground where it stood. The Great Gate of Minas Tirith, constructed of iron and steel and guarded by stone towers and bastions, was the main gate on the first wall level of the city. (Note: Tolkien 1955, book 5, ch. 4 "The Siege of Gondor") Tolkien called it a "Byzantine City".

Brooke remarks that where Rohan had a long low hall, Gondor has a tall tower, suggesting defence as well as signalling architectural skill, while "its whiteness reflects the enlightened Gondorian society". As for the interiors, the nature-loving Hobbit Pippin sees the palace's "tall pillars" as being like "monoliths ...[rising] to great capitals carved in many strange figures of beasts and leaves". Brooke comments that the Hobbit recognises the carved foliage, but finds its expression in stone incongruous. As for the walls, they have no "hangings nor storied webs, nor anything of woven stuff or of wood", but only "tall images graven in cold stone". Once again, this contrasts with Meduseld's comfortable warmth, with its "many woven cloths ... hung upon the walls" telling the stories of "figures of ancient legend".

=== Dark towers ===
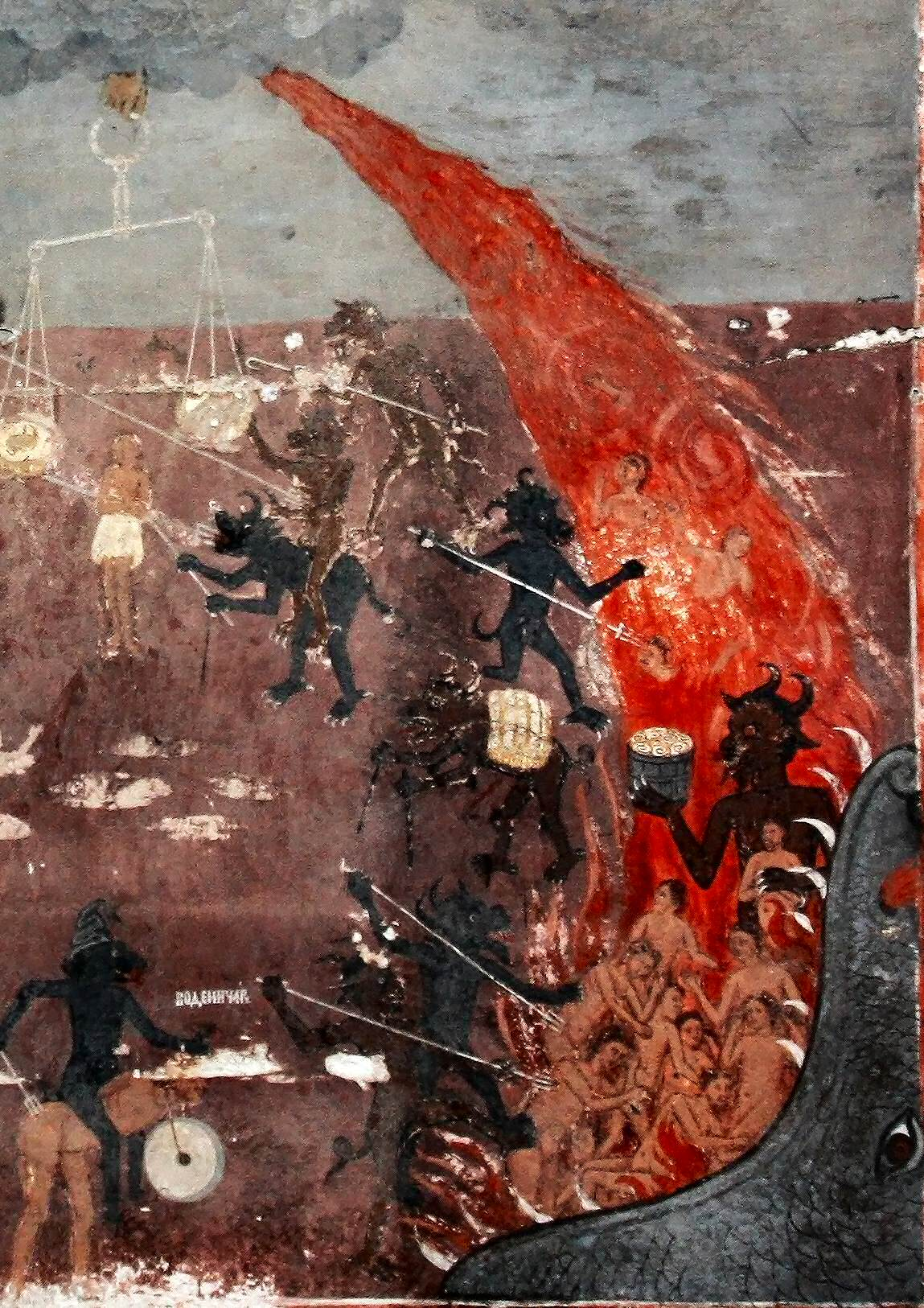
Isengard: an "industrial hell", as Tolkien wrote "tunneled .. dark .. deep .. graveyard of unquiet dead .. furnaces". Medieval fresco of hell, St Nicholas in Raduil, Bulgaria

Tolkien's evil realms of the Dark Lord Sauron and the fallen Wizard Saruman are damaged lands around tall dark towers. Sauron's tower is Barad-dûr, in the volcanic land of Mordor; (Note: Tolkien 1954, book 6 ch. 3, "Mount Doom") Saruman's is Orthanc, in the polluted industrial enclosure of Isengard. (Note: Tolkien 1954, book 3 ch. 8, "The Road to Isengard") (Note: Tolkien 1954, book 3 ch. 10, "The Voice of Saruman") David Oberhelman, in The J. R. R. Tolkien Encyclopedia, writes that Tolkien's towers can signify creativity and the desire for transcendence and immortality: or hubris, overreach, and antagonism. He notes that there are many towers in The Silmarillion, signifying "celestial power". Such high seats are matched by the high mountain Taniquetil, where both Manwe and Varda, powerful Valar, dwell. That high place itself, Oberhelman writes, has a bright reflection in Amon Hen, the Seat of Seeing in Middle-earth, and a dark one in Barad-dûr.

Tolkien describes Barad-dûr as a "vast fortress, armoury, prison, furnace of great power". The fortress was constructed with many towers and was hidden in clouds, "rising black, blacker and darker than the vast shades amid which it stood, the cruel pinnacles and iron crown of the topmost tower of Barad-dûr." It could not be clearly seen because Sauron created shadows about himself that crept out from the tower. Frodo sees the immense tower from Amon Hen, the Hill of Seeing, as

wall upon wall, battlement upon battlement, black, immeasurably strong, mountain of iron, gate of steel, tower of adamant... Barad-dûr, Fortress of Sauron.

There was a look-out post, the "Window of the Eye", at the top of Barad-dûr. This window was visible from Mount Doom where Frodo and Sam had a terrible glimpse of the Eye of Sauron. Barad-dûr's west gate is described as "huge" and the west bridge as "a vast bridge of iron."

Isengard was for most of its history a green and pleasant place, according to Tolkien, with many fruiting trees. It stood in front of Methedras, the southernmost peak of the Misty Mountains, which formed its northern wall. The rest of the perimeter consisted of a large wall, the Ring of Isengard, breached only by the inflow of the river Isen at the north-east through a portcullis, and the gate of Isengard at the south, at both shores of the river. The tower of Orthanc was built towards the end of the Second Age by men of Gondor from four many-sided columns of rock joined by an unknown process and then hardened. No known weapon could harm it. The place became evil only after Saruman took it over, filling it with pits and tunnels where his Orcs worked underground with fire and wheels. (Note: Tolkien 1954, book 3 ch. 9, "Flotsam and Jetsam") Orthanc rose to more than 500 feet (150 metres) above the plain of Isengard, and ended in four sharp peaks. Its only entrance was at the top of a high stair, and above that was a small window and balcony.

The Tolkien scholar Charles A. Huttar called Saruman's city of Isengard an "industrial hell".

== Peter Jackson's vision ==
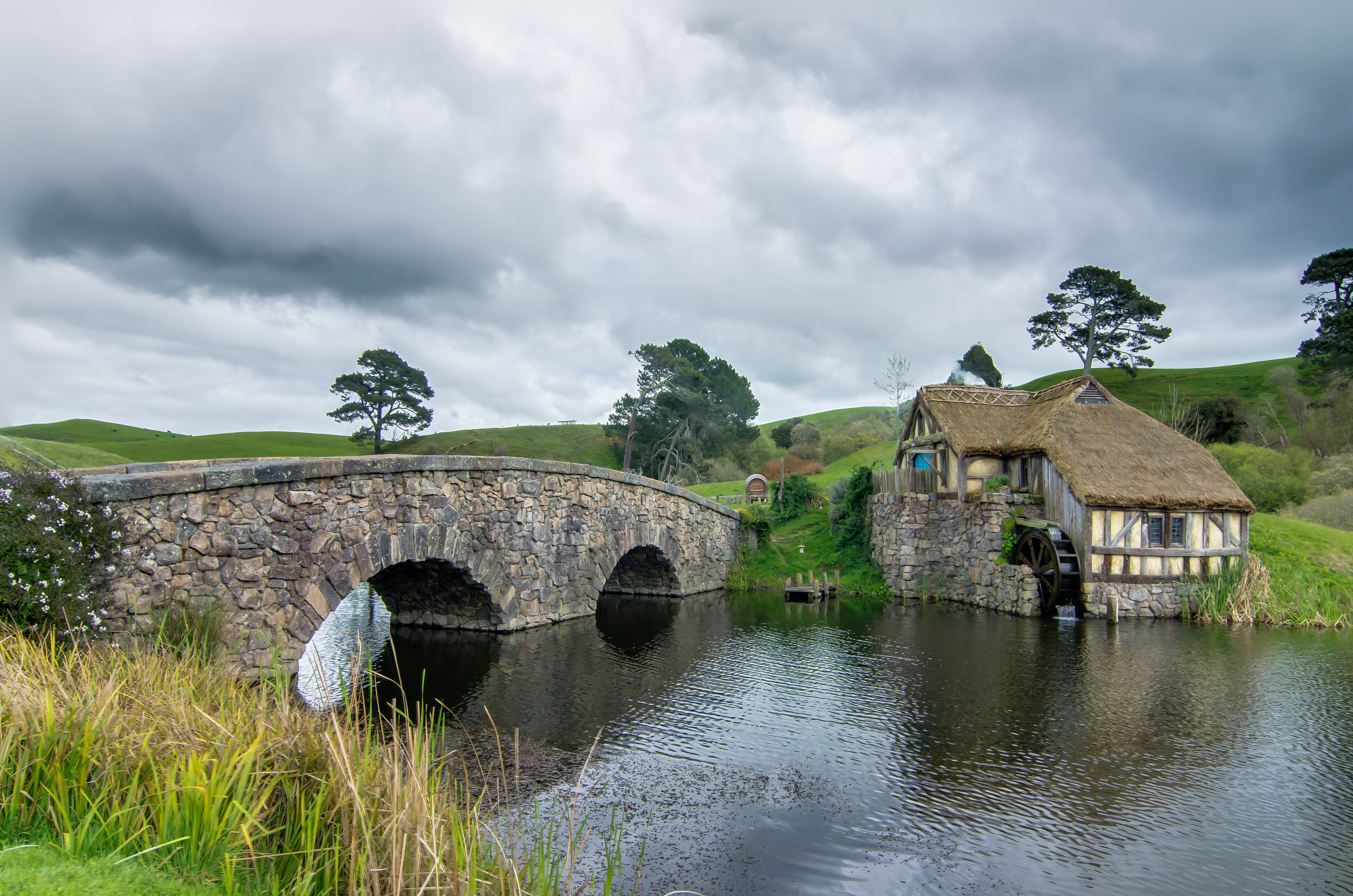
The bridge over The Water, near the centre of the Shire, and the mill at Hobbiton, constructed in New Zealand for Peter Jackson's The Lord of the Rings film series

Peter Jackson used elaborate sets, some constructed in New Zealand landscapes, others using "bigatures" and computer animation, to create a visual interpretation of Middle-earth that was widely admired by scholars and critics, even those otherwise hostile to his adaptation.

The scholars Steven Woodward and Kostis Kourelis write that Jackson made "aggressive use of architectural form to tell a story" in his The Lord of the Rings film series. In their view, Tolkien had omitted details of architecture; they state in terms that Jackson's "celebrated architectural vision did not take its cue from Tolkien's literary prototype", so Jackson was forced to invent his "alternate universe of intricately realized spaces and places"; they note that The Return of the King won an Oscar for its art direction. Much of the architecture was based on Alan Lee's drawings from the Centenary edition of The Lord of the Rings, supplemented by illustrations of scenes of action by John Howe. Woodward and Kourelis describe Jackson as "entirely conservative" in his architectural sets, implementing Lee's drawings as closely as possible, in striking contrast to the adventurous journeys of the characters through his wide landscapes.

On the other hand, Woodward and Kourelis state that Jackson was sensitive to Tolkien's use of "the iconicity of the image" to indicate meaning in the story. They write that the natural world and the built environment flow together, whether to convey an idyll or a nightmare. Thus,

the hobbit houses of the Shire are molded under the contours of gently rolling hills; ... the human city of Minas Tirith takes the logic of its form and defences from the rocky pinnacle it encircles. ... [while] both Saruman’s and Sauron’s towers soar abruptly out of desolate plains over which they exert panoptical control."

In Peter Jackson's 2001 film The Fellowship of the Ring, Rivendell is romantically conceived, with sophisticated culture. The "post-Ruskinian" style does not match Tolkien's own illustrations, though it matches his dislike of industrialised manufacture.

This mirroring of psychology in architecture relies on both external form and interior design. Bag End has comfortable British vernacular wooden panelling, whereas the Elves' dwellings are designed with the intricately curving naturalism of Art Nouveau. The scholar of humanities Brian Rosebury comments that Jackson presents the Elves as sophisticated, whereas Tolkien made them close to nature. All the same, he writes, the film Rivendell's "architecture and ornaments are dominated by natural motifs", suggesting "integration with nature, but at one remove", something that works well for the "Portmeirion-like idyll" of the portrayed Rivendell. Rosebury describes the design as "post-Ruskinian", as in pre-Raphaelite paintings, William Morris's Arts and Crafts designs, and Art Nouveau architectural details. These differ from Tolkien's own illustrations, but in a way, Rosebury suggests, that Tolkien would have liked as it matches his dislike of industrialised manufacture. Lee's sketches of Rivendell give more detail than Tolkien's, the interior vistas structured by light and delicate curving timbers and furniture in Art Nouveau style.

The evil realms have in Woodward and Kourelis's view "the dark, metallic forms of an ultra-Gothic grotesque, invoking caves, dark pools, vaulted arches lit by firelight", suggesting torture, contrasting with Gondor's heroic "archaeological signature of medieval monuments: vast reaches of white marble, ashlar courses, draftsman’s elevations." They comment that "without [the] deployment of an architectural typology [for Minas Tirith], the exact nature of the conflict in Middle Earth would likely remain unclear." Finally, Rohan's Golden Hall of Meduseld has "lavishly decorated stables befit[ting a] horse-based culture", made grand with "Celtic gold ornamentation" and horse motifs; Lee based his drawings on the mead-hall Heorot in Beowulf.

Woodward and Kourelis end by quoting Tolkien's description in his 1936 lecture "Beowulf: The Monsters and the Critics" of the "historical space" in Beowulf, stating that it could unreservedly be applied to the extraordinary spatial vision of Jackson's films:

The whole must have succeeded admirably in creating in the minds of the poet's contemporaries the illusion of surveying a past, pagan but noble and fraught with deep significance—a past that itself had depth and reached backward into a dark antiquity of sorrow. (Note: Tolkien 1936, pp. 245–295)

== J. D. Payne and Patrick McCoy's vision ==
"Looming marble structures": a port city of the island Kingdom of Númenor in The Lord of the Rings: The Rings of Power, as envisaged by production designer Ramsey Avery

The showrunners J. D. Payne and Patrick McKay developed and produced The Lord of the Rings: The Rings of Power. The series is based on clues in The Lord of the Rings about events set mainly in the earlier Second Age. Middle-earth locations used include a port in the island Kingdom of the Men of Númenor – recalling the legend of Atlantis in being lost beneath the waves at the end of the Second Age; and the Elvish realm of Lindon, all that was left of the Elvish region of Beleriand, destroyed at the end of the First Age. Payne and McKay created architectures to help to convey the character of each race involved in the story. Howe prepared 40 sketchbooks full of drawings for the project.

The Númenor set was described as "an entire seaside city" with buildings, alleyways, shrines, graffiti, and a ship docked at the harbour. The production designer Ramsey Avery used different styles for each location: Númenor's "looming marble structures" were inspired by Ancient Greece and Venice, while he used the colour blue to reflect the culture's emphasis on water and sailing; Lindon was inspired by Gothic architecture, with "tree-like columns and arboreal details" to reflect the Elves' love of nature.
