= Bag End =

Fictional location in Tolkien's novels

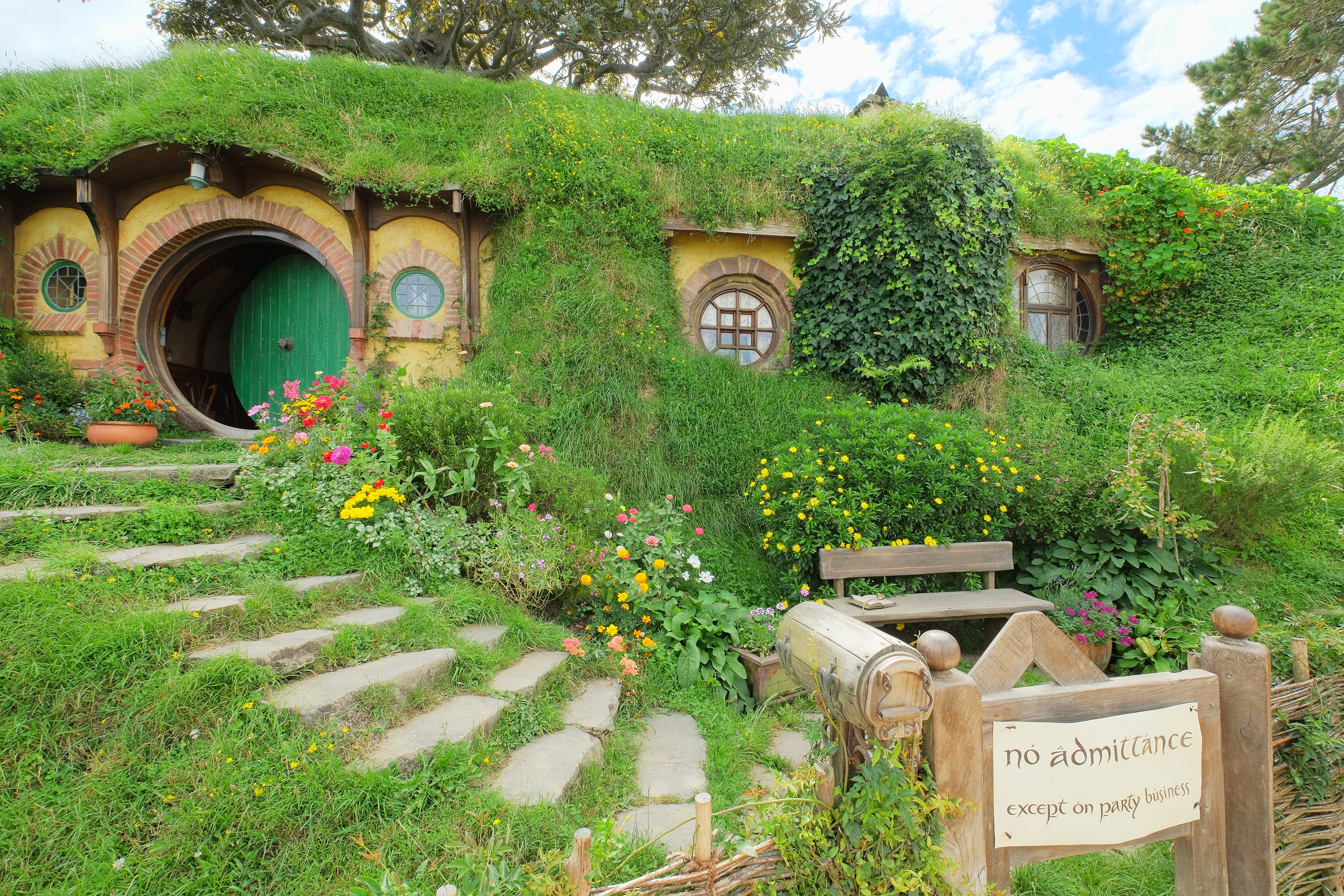
Bag End, Hobbiton, the comfortable underground dwelling of Bilbo and later Frodo Baggins, constructed for Peter Jackson's The Lord of the Rings film series.

Tolkien's painting The Hill: Hobbiton-across-the-Water, watercolour, 1938 showing its ideal position near the top of the Hill at Hobbiton, with less-favoured Hobbit-holes lower down.

Bag End is the underground dwelling of the Hobbits Bilbo and Frodo Baggins in J. R. R. Tolkien's fantasy novels The Hobbit and The Lord of the Rings. From there, both Bilbo and Frodo set out on their adventures, and both return there, for a while. As such, Bag End represents the familiar, safe, comfortable place which is the antithesis of the dangerous places that they visit. It forms one end of the main story arcs in the novels, and since the Hobbits return there, it also forms an end point in the story circle in each case.

Tolkien described himself as a Hobbit in all but size. Scholars have noted that Bag End is a vision of Tolkien's ideal home, and effectively an expression of character. Peter Jackson built an elaborate Hobbiton film set including a detailed Bag End in New Zealand for his The Lord of the Rings film series.

== Description ==
=== J. R. R. Tolkien ===
The Hall at Bag-End, Residence of B. Baggins Esquire: Tolkien's drawing of Bilbo Baggins in the front hall of Bag End, showing it as a sizeable room with 20th century fittings including a clock and a barometer.

The Hobbit begins with "among the most famous first lines in literature":

In a hole in the ground there lived a hobbit. Not a nasty, dirty, wet hole, filled with the ends of worms and an oozy smell, nor yet a dry, bare, sandy hole with nothing in it to sit down on or to eat: it was a hobbit-hole, and that means comfort.

The protagonists of The Hobbit and The Lord of the Rings, Bilbo and Frodo Baggins, lived at Bag End, a luxurious smial or Hobbit-burrow, dug into The Hill on the north side of the town of Hobbiton in the Shire's Westfarthing. Tolkien made drawings of Bag End and Hobbiton. His watercolour The Hill: Hobbiton-across-the Water shows the exterior and the surrounding countryside. Tolkien made several pencil and ink sketches for these subjects, only gradually settling on Bag End's final location and architecture.

Another of Tolkien's drawings, The Hall at Bag-End, Residence of B. Baggins Esquire, depicts the interior, complete with 20th century fittings such as a wall clock and barometer. Another clock is mentioned in chapter 2 of The Hobbit. The barometer is mentioned in Tolkien's drafts of The Hobbit.

=== Peter Jackson ===
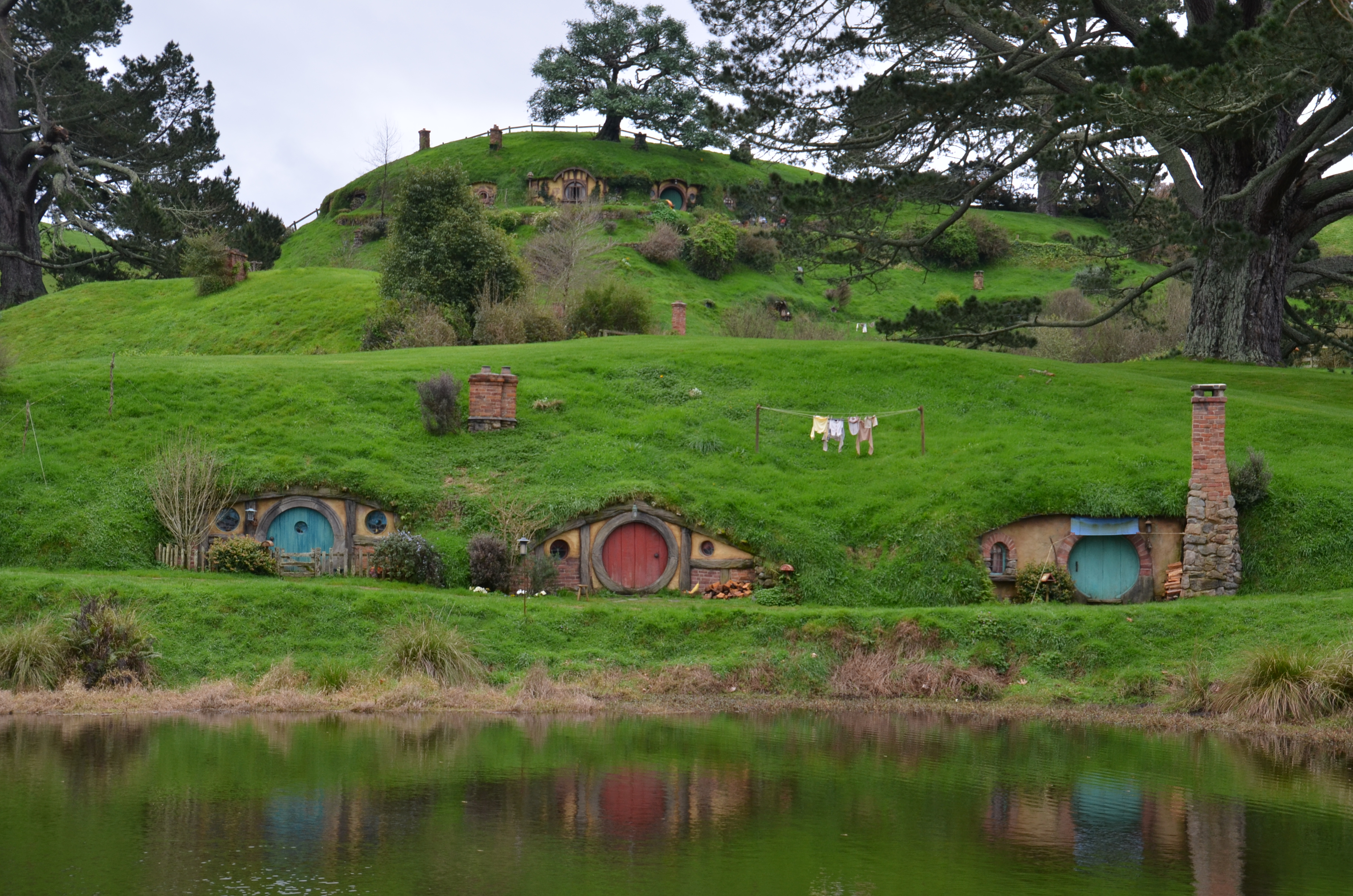
Jackson's version of the Hill at Hobbiton on the Water. The image may be compared with Tolkien's watercolour painting The Hill: Hobbiton-across-the-Water (above).

Peter Jackson had an elaborate Hobbiton film set built on the Alexander sheep farm at Matamata in New Zealand for his The Lord of the Rings film series. It included a water-mill, the Green Dragon Inn, and several Hobbit-holes as well as Bag End in a small hill, with garden. Jackson said of the set, "It felt as if you could open the circular green door of Bag End and find Bilbo Baggins inside."

== Analysis ==
=== Real-world origins ===
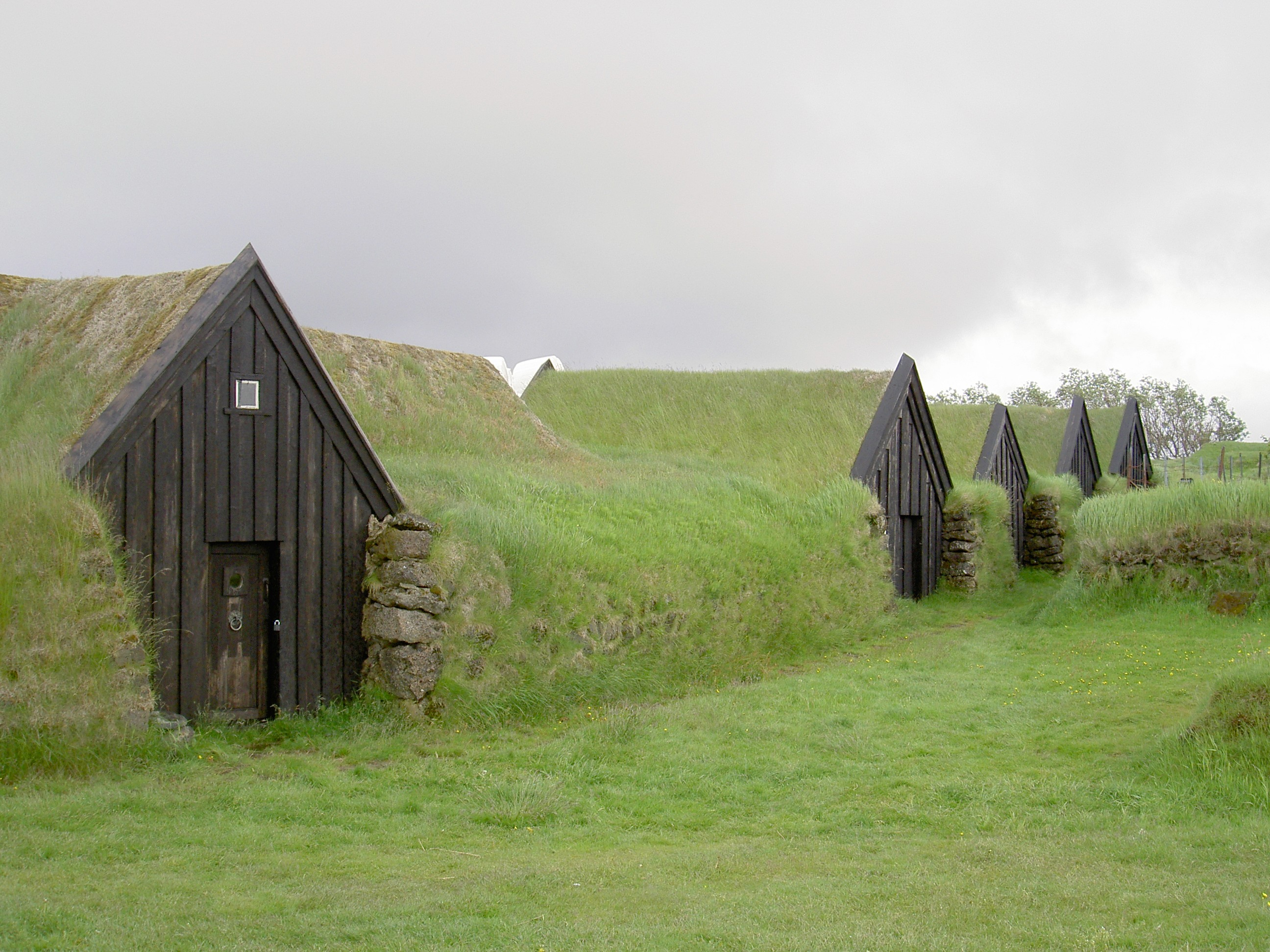
Turf-covered houses at Keldur, Iceland

"Bag End" was the real name of the Tudor home, dated to 1413, of Tolkien's aunt Jane Neave in the village of Dormston, Worcestershire. The scholar of literature and film Steven Woodward and the architectural historian Kostis Kourelis suggest that Tolkien may have based his Hobbit-holes on Iceland's turf houses, such as those at Keldur.

=== Character from architecture ===
Tolkien stated "I am in fact a Hobbit", and scholars agree that he was in many ways like his Hobbits, enjoying good food, gardening, smoking a pipe, and living in a familiar and comfortable home. Tolkien makes Bag End a place where, in the Tolkien scholar Thomas Honegger's words, "most readers feel severely tempted to put on their imaginary slippers and settle down to a piece of cake and some tea." Honegger argues that places have a critical role in The Lord of the Rings, and the function of the safe Hobbit-hole is to establish the character of the "hol-bytlan (hole-dwellers), in the first place stationary beings who have a deep-rooted aversion against travelling outside the Shire." For them, Honegger writes, "Travelling abroad belongs to the same class as adventures", quoting Bilbo's remark in The Hobbit: "Nasty disturbing uncomfortable things! Make you late for dinner!"

Joseph Wright's 1898–1905 The English Dialect Dictionary has an entry for hobman, one of many possible sources of the word hobbit, which states that "Each elf-man or hobman had his habitation, to which he gave his name". The Tolkien scholar Michael Livingston comments that from this it is easy "to recall the man-like, elf-friend, hole-dwelling hobbit Mr. Baggins of Bag-End, hired by the not-too-dissimilar dwarves to commit thievery".

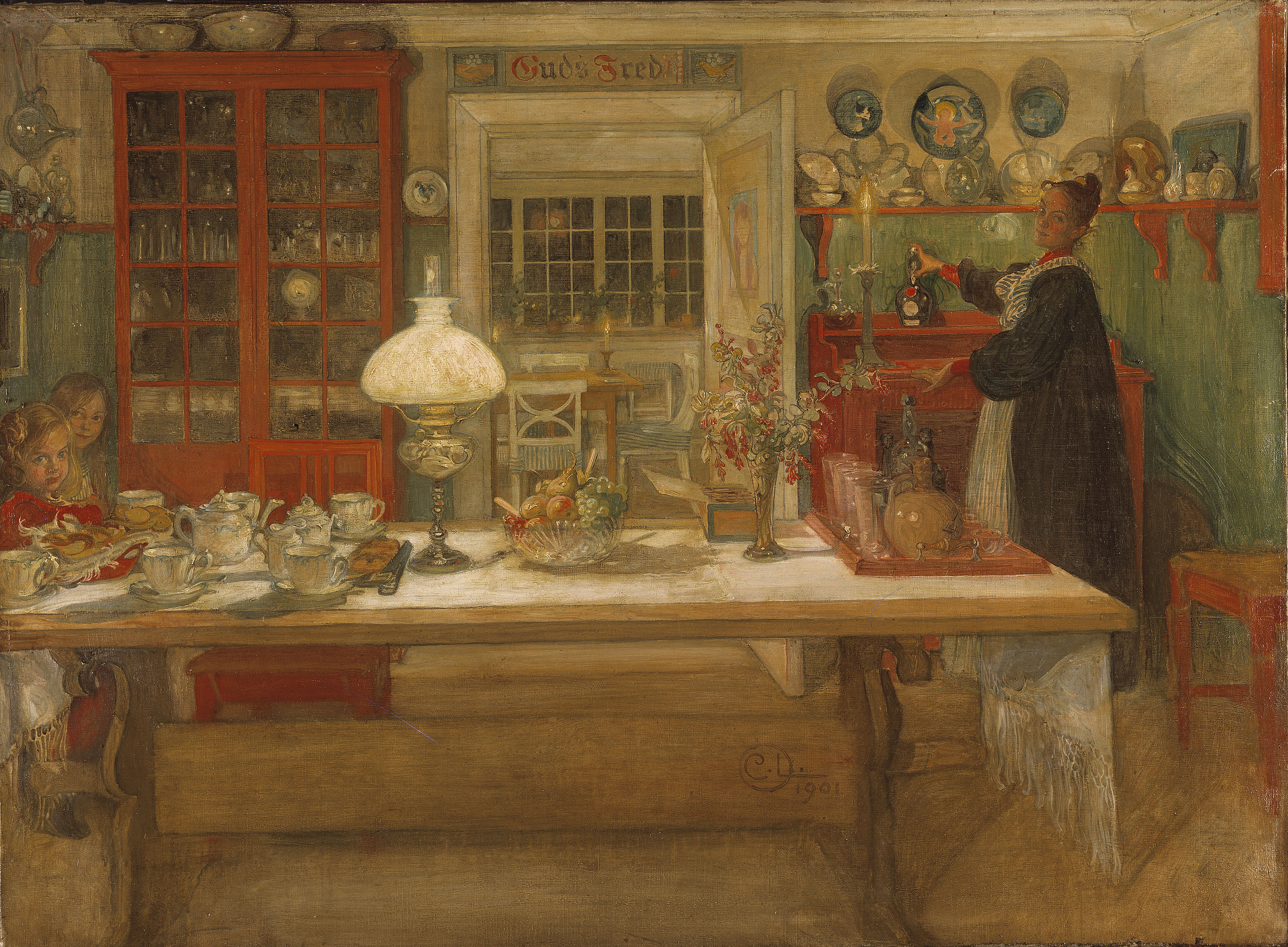
A cosy interior: the Swedish artist Carl Larsson portrayed his Arts and Crafts-inspired home in 1901 in this painting. Johanna Brooke suggests that Bag End could have been in such a style.

The scholar of literature Johanna Brooke writes in the Journal of Tolkien Research that the character of Bilbo Baggins can be inferred from the architecture of Bag End, just as that of Hobbits in general can be deduced from their preference for living in holes. She suggests that Bag End is an Arts and Crafts building, fitting into the ideas of the designer William Morris and others in the period between 1880 and 1920. Features such as Bag End's panelled walls, tiles, and carpet could all, Brooke writes, have been manufactured by Morris & Co., while the prosperous Hobbit-hole clearly indicates that Bilbo is middle-class. Its position at the top of The Hill "demonstrates a physical and social elevation above other hole-owners", since as Tolkien wrote in the Prologue to The Lord of the Rings, "suitable sites for these large and ramifying tunnels...were not everywhere to be found".

Brooke notes Tolkien's statement that "only the richest and poorest" in fact were able to continue the traditional Hobbit-practice of living in holes: the poor might have, as Tolkien said, "burrows of the most primitive kind... with only one window or none". Bag End is sharply contrasted with such a burrow, its best rooms being provided with "deep-set round windows". Brooke comments that Tolkien has shown this in The Hill: Hobbiton-across-the-Water, where Bag End has several windows while the Hobbit-holes further down (of Bagshot Row) have fewer. Other signifiers of wealth and class include such Victorian era comforts as a dining-room, multiple pantries, and wardrobes. Such things could indicate, Brooke writes, that Bag End's owner is "indulgent, overly-luxurious, too comfortable, a tad vain even", though against this, the hanging-space for many hats and coats suggests that welcoming guests is important to him. Brooke quotes Morris's remark that "the working man cannot afford to live in anything that an architect could design; moderate-sized rabbit-warrens [are] for rich middle-class men", stating that with its mention of rabbit warrens, this "aptly suits Bag End".

The cartographer Karen Wynn Fonstad's plan of Bag End, showing her vision of its comfortable layout with many cellars and pantries, and multiple fireplaces and chimneys.

The cartographer Karen Wynn Fonstad created a plan of Bag End, showing her vision of its comfortable layout with many cellars and pantries, complete with multiple fireplaces and chimneys, based on the clues given by Tolkien in The Hobbit and The Lord of the Rings. Her plan makes Bag End some 130 feet (40 m) long and up to 50 feet (15 m) wide, cut into the Hill. Honegger writes that Fonstad's work has contributed substantially to giving Middle-earth an "independent existence".

=== Only one outlet ===
The Tolkien scholar Tom Shippey writes that the name Bag End is a direct translation of the French cul-de-sac ("bottom of [a] bag"), something that he calls "a silly phrase... a piece of 'French-oriented snobbery', used in England to mean a dead end, a road with only one outlet"; he notes that the French say impasse for the same thing. (Note: The French actually also say un cul-de-sac, see the relevant French Wiktionary entry.) The journeys of Bilbo and Frodo have been interpreted as just such confined roads, as they both start and end in Bag End. According to Don D. Elgin, Tolkien's A Walking Song, which appears repeatedly in differing forms in The Lord of the Rings as the quest progresses, is "a song about the roads that go ever on until they return to at last to the familiar things they have always known." As such, it forms one end of the main story arcs in both The Hobbit and The Lord of the Rings, and since the Hobbits return there, it also forms an end point in the story circle in each case.

=== The most desirable residence ===
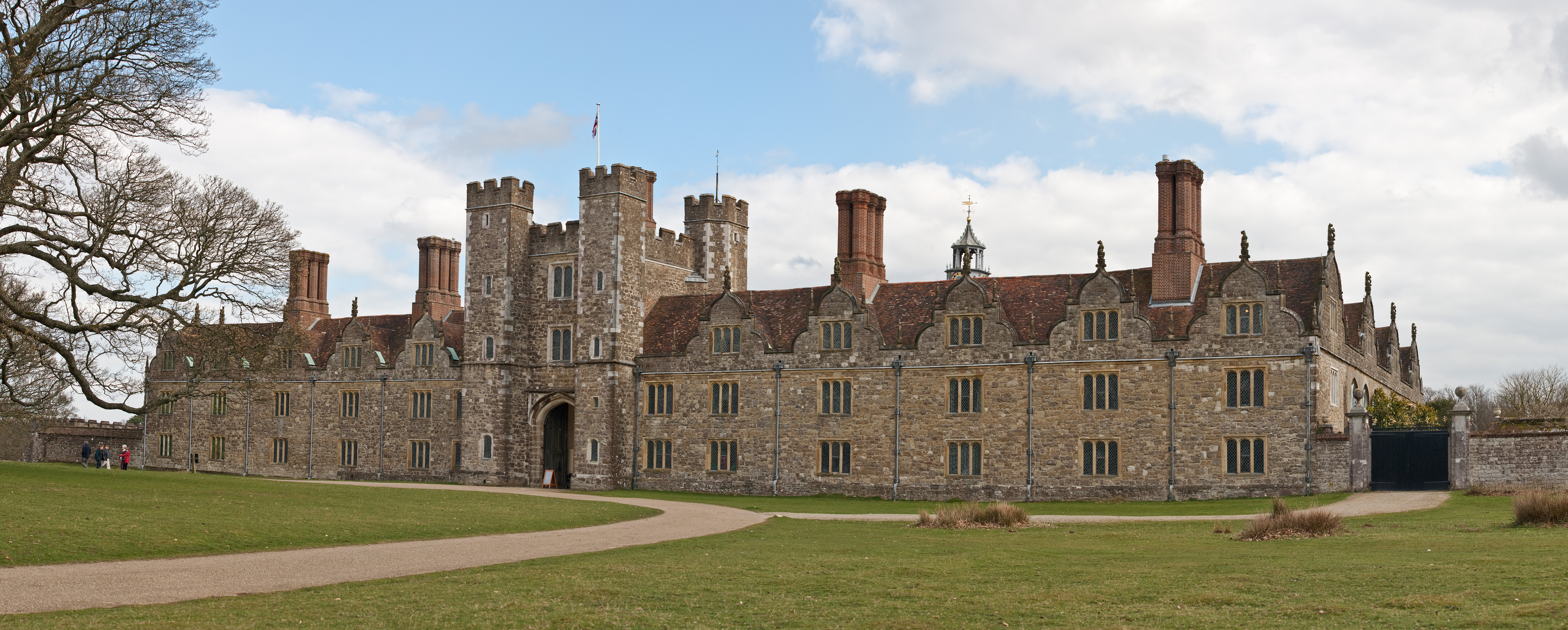
Lobelia Sackville-Baggins's desire to acquire ‘Bag End’, Bilbo's home, has been compared to Vita Sackville-West's frustrated desire to inherit her family home, Knole House (pictured).

The journalist Matthew Dennison compares Lobelia Sackville-Baggins's desire to move into Bag End to the similarly-named aristocrat Vita Sackville-West's passionate attachment to her family home, Knole House, which she was unable to inherit. Sackville-West became famous as a novelist and poet, and by the time The Lord of the Rings was published, as The Observer's gardening columnist. Dennison notes that Lobelia is a garden flower, and that readers in the 1950s would immediately have linked the character to the famous gardener.

Shippey argues that the Bagginses and the Sackville-Bagginses are "connected opposites", since the opposite of a bourgeois is a burglar, a person who breaks into bourgeois houses, and in The Hobbit Bilbo is asked to become a burglar, to break into the lair of Smaug the dragon. He observes that the name Sackville-Baggins, for the snobbish branch of the Baggins family, is a philological joke, as Sac[k]-ville can be translated as the French form of the humble "Bag Town", another attempt to reinforce the family's bourgeois status by "Frenchify[ing]" their surname.

Tom Shippey's analysis of the relationships between Baggins and Sackville-Baggins
Feature	Bilbo Baggins	Lobelia Sackville-Baggins
Manner, attitude	Plain	Snobbish
Role in story	Burglar	Bourgeois
Language	English (dialect) (Note: Shippey notes that "Baggins" is close to the spoken words bæggin, bægginz in the dialect of Huddersfield, Yorkshire.)	Frenchified
No through road	Bag End	cul-de-sac
Bag End	Actual owner, resident	Would-be owner, resident

=== Contrasts with faraway places ===
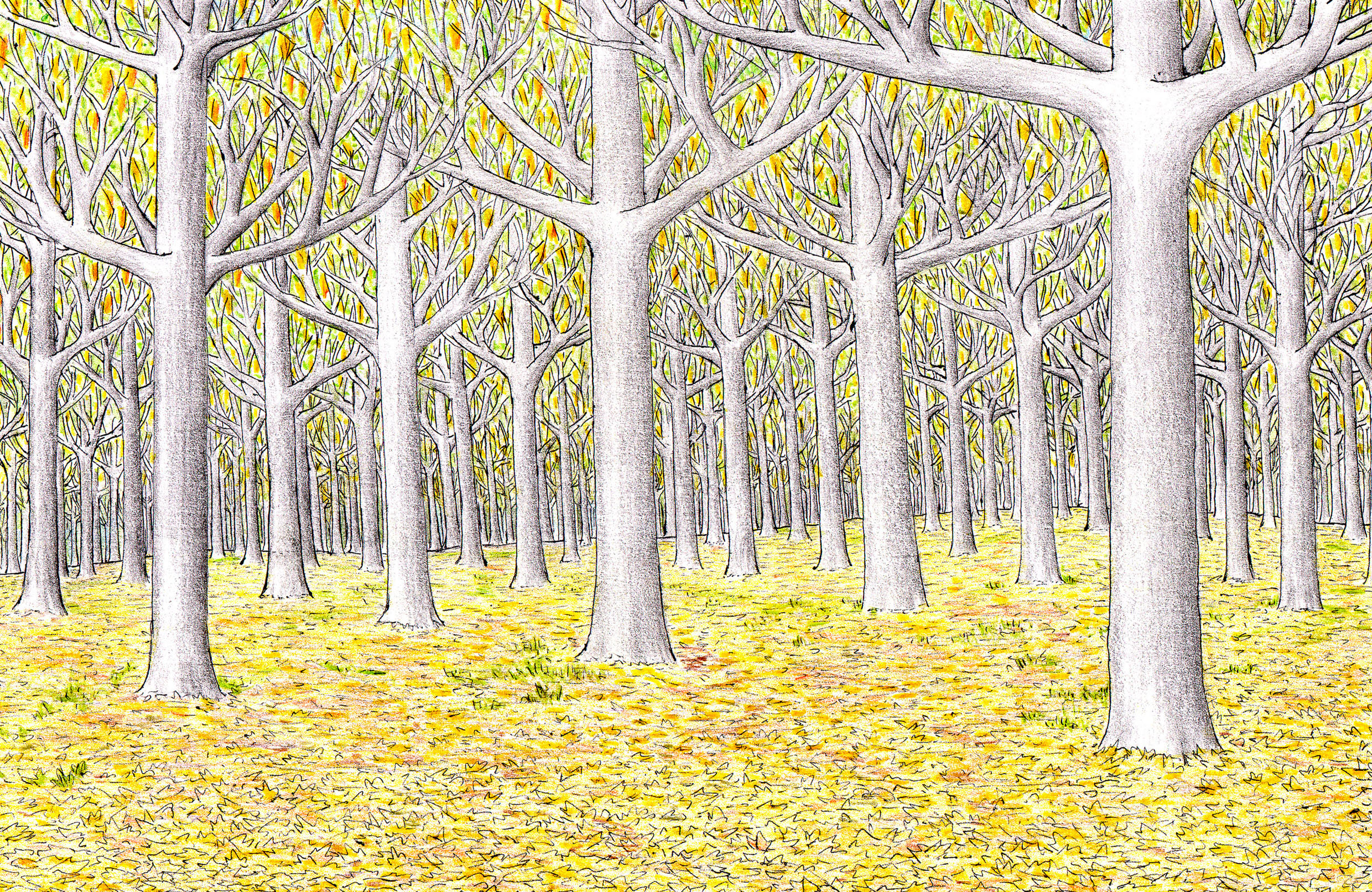
Contrast with Bag End: Matěj Čadil's artist's impression of Lothlórien, "an airy glade in a forest filled with sunlight, evoking a feeling of sheltered openness."

The historian Joseph Loconte wrote that Tolkien had set up a contrast between Frodo's light and serene Bag End and the corrupted wizard Saruman's dark and industrially destructive Isengard. Loconte likens this to the contrast in Tolkien's fellow-Inkling C. S. Lewis's 1950 children's book The Lion, the Witch and the Wardrobe between the delightful but humble home of Mr. and Mrs. Beaver, and the icy opulence of the palace of the White Witch. In Loconte's view, both authors "reintroduce[d] into the popular imagination a Christian vision of hope in a world tortured by doubt and disillusionment".

Honegger points out a quite different contrast, between Bag End as depicted in Tolkien's drawing The Hall at Bag End, "the homely yet narrowly limited space of a hobbit-hole with the similarly neat and defined landscape of the Shire in the background," with his The Forest of Lothlórien in Spring, which shows "no particular place, but an airy glade in a forest filled with sunlight, evoking a feeling of sheltered openness." If the Shire is a "secluded [and] remote petit bourgeois idyll", then, Honegger suggests, Lothlórien is a "transcendental [or] idealised idyll". Further, the comfortable Hobbit-holes of the Shire stand in contrast to the untamed nature of the Old Forest, the idyllic Rivendell, and even to what had been the "promised land" of the Dwarves, Moria. The same applies, Honegger argues, to time: where Bag End and the Shire are anachronistically in the present, the Old Forest, Rivendell, and Lothlórien represent journeys back into the past.

Thomas Honegger's comparison of Bag End with faraway places
Bag End, The Shire		Faraway place		
Quality	Time	Name	Quality	Time
Homely, narrowly limited	In the present	Forest of Lothlórien	Sheltered openness	In the past
Secluded petit bourgeois idyll	In the present	Forest of Lothlórien	transcendental, idealised idyll	In the past
Comfortable, tame	In the present	Old Forest	Untamed nature	In the past
Comfortable, tame	In the present	Rivendell	Idyllic	In the past
Comfortable, tame	In the present	Moria	Dwarves' promised land	In the past

=== Strangeness ===
Bag End receives strange visitors – Gandalf and the Dwarves, making it seem a "queer place", in the character Ted Sandyman's words, "and its folk are queerer". Bilbo and Frodo come to be seen as strange also. Bilbo is "very rich and very peculiar", not least because he seems not to grow old, but also because he went on a journey outside the Shire, and returned changed. David LaFontaine writes in The Gay and Lesbian Review Worldwide that Bilbo is a "confirmed bachelor" who is never "linked romantically" with any woman, and who lives alone in the "luxurious, lovely environment", Bag End, "illustrating the hobbit's artistic sensibility". LaFontaine comments that Tolkien admires Bilbo's "unconventional lifestyle ... almost to the point of envy." To LaFontaine, Tolkien's account of Bilbo's "queerness" is to be interpreted as a portrait of a homosexual man.

== Parody ==
The 1969 parody novel Bored of the Rings, written by the National Lampoon founders Henry Beard and Douglas Kenney, mocks Frodo's homecoming to Bag End from his dangerous quest with the words "he walked directly to his cozy fire and slumped in the chair. He began to muse upon the years of delicious boredom that lay ahead. Perhaps he would take up Scrabble".

== See also ==
- Earthship

== Sources ==
- Tolkien, J. R. R. (1937). The Hobbit. George Allen & Unwin.
