= Hobbiton Movie Set =

Hobbiton
- Movie Set / Tourist Attraction
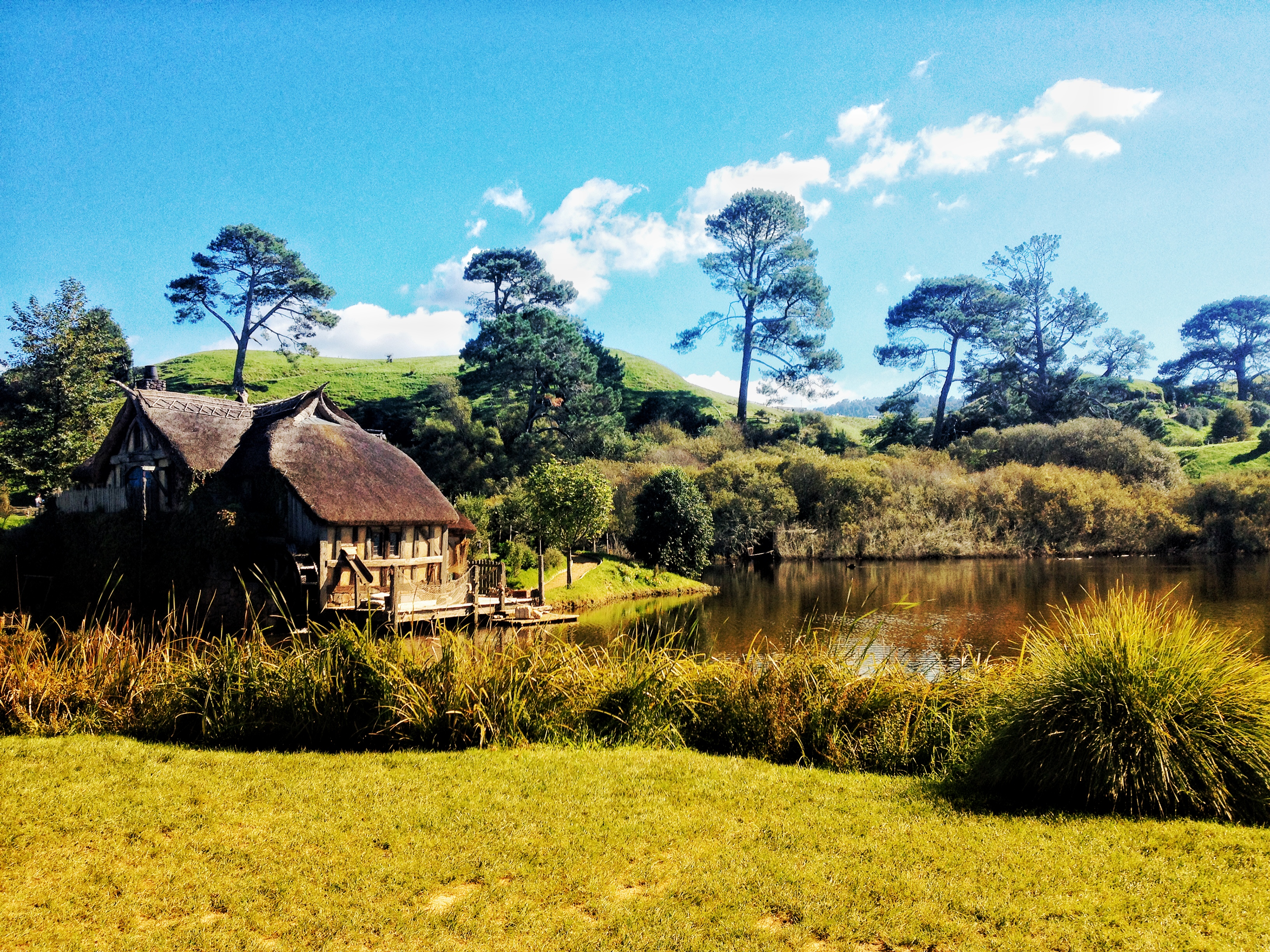
- A small Waterhouse opposite to the Green Dragon Inn

- Hobbiton's location within New Zealand Hobbiton (North Island)
- Coordinates: 37°51′27″S 175°40′47″E
- Country: New Zealand
- Region: Waikato
- Territorial authority: Matamata-Piako District

The Hobbiton Movie Set is a significant location used for The Lord of the Rings film trilogy and The Hobbit film trilogy, serving as a stand-in for the town of Hobbiton in the Shire in both trilogies. It is situated on a family-run farm about 8 kilometres (5.0 mi) west of Hinuera and 10 kilometres (6.2 mi) southwest of Matamata, in Waikato, New Zealand, and is now a Tolkien tourism destination, offering a guided tour of the set.

== Pre-film set history ==
The geology of the area is that of the Hinuera Formation, a group of alluvial silts, sands and gravels laid down in the Last Glacial Period. Originally largely marshland, it was transformed in the 19th century by a large-scale drainage scheme and is now fertile agricultural land and a major racehorse breeding area.

The Alexander family moved to the 500-hectare (1,200-acre) property of rolling grassland where the set is located in 1978. Since then it has been a livestock farm with 13,000 sheep and 300 Angus beef cattle. The main sources of income from farming are mutton, wool and beef.

== The Lord of the Rings ==
When director Peter Jackson began to look for suitable locations for The Lord of the Rings film series, he first saw the Alexander Farm during an aerial search in 1998 and concluded that the area was "like a slice of ancient England". Set Decorator Alan Lee commented that the location's hills "looked as though Hobbits had already begun excavations". Part of the site has a lake with a long arm that could double as a river.

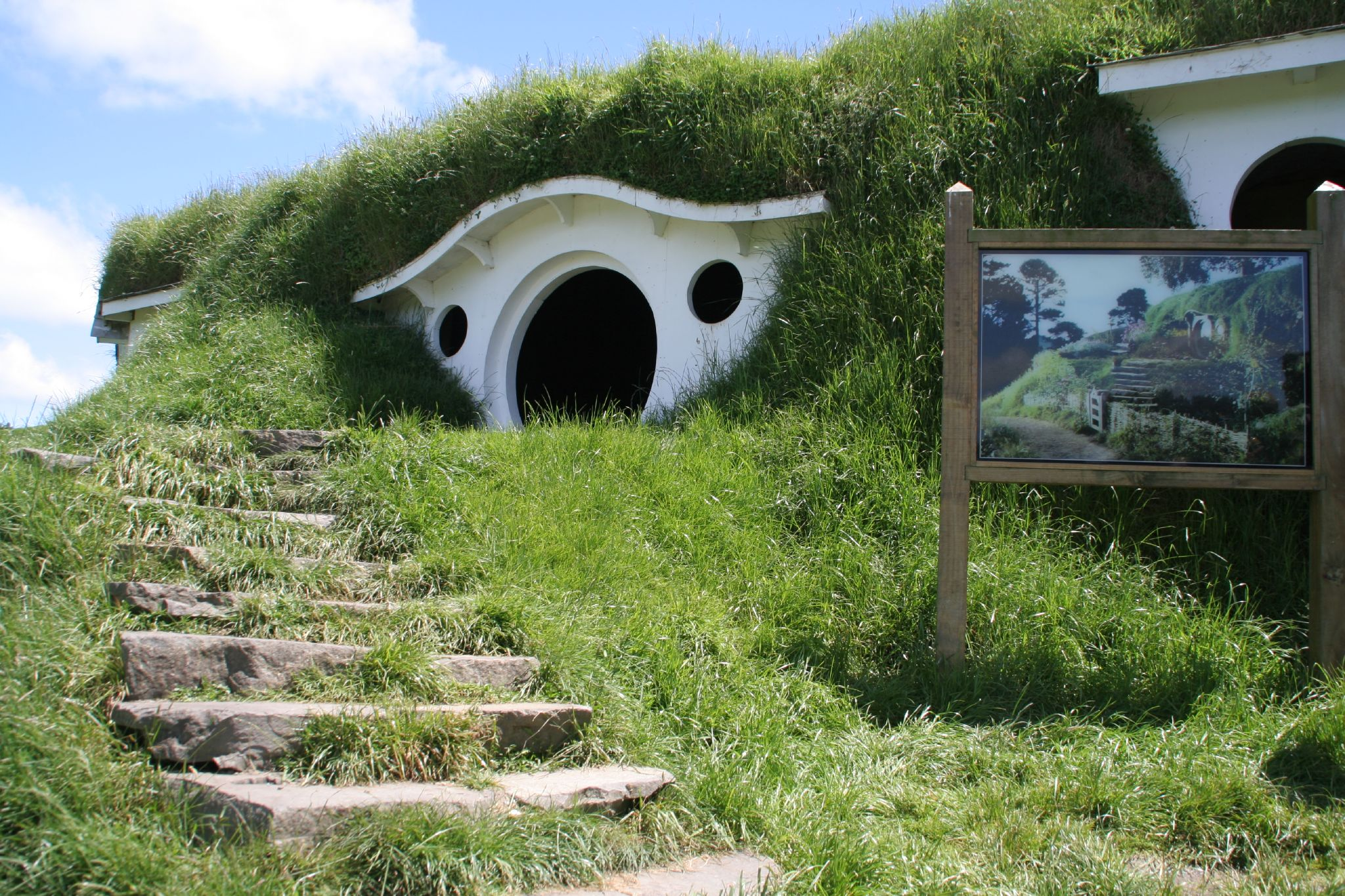
The exterior of Bag End in 2006 before its 2010 make-over

After suitable negotiations with the owners, work commenced in transforming part of the farm into sets for Hobbiton and other parts of J. R. R. Tolkien's Shire in March 1999. The New Zealand Army brought in heavy equipment to make 1.5 kilometres (0.93 mi) of road into the site from the nearest local road and initial ground works. Further work included building the facades for 37 hobbit holes and associated gardens and hedges, a mill and double arch bridge, and erecting a 26-tonne (29-ton) oak above Bag End that was cut down near Matamata and recreated on site, complete with artificial leaves. Thatch on the pub and mill roofs was made from rushes growing on the farm. Generators were installed and water and sewage also had to be considered. Catering was made available for up to 400 cast, crew and visitors per day.

Jackson wrote: "I knew Hobbiton needed to be warm, comfortable and feel lived in. By letting the weeds grow through the cracks and establishing hedges and little gardens a year before filming, we ended up with an incredibly real place, not just a film set". Lee commented that "it was satisfying to see that it had taken on something of the look of the Devonshire countryside I'd lived in for the past twenty-five years".

Ian Alexander, the property owner, had initially been told that after filming, Hobbiton was to be removed, and the area completely restored back to its original farmland. After filming, the production crew returned to the site and pulled down much of the Hobbiton set. Many of the Hobbit Holes were filled with soil and covered over. However, because of heavy rain, 18 of the 37 Hobbit Holes were left untouched, with plans for the film crew to return after the rains and destroy all of them. The Alexander Family then made a deal with the Production company to save the remainder of the Hobbiton and to allow for organised visits for the public.

== Filming The Hobbit ==
The original set was not built to last, the hobbit hole facades having been constructed from untreated timber, ply and polystyrene and partially torn down after filming. In 2010, the set was rebuilt in a more permanent fashion for The Hobbit: An Unexpected Journey, filming for which began in 2011. Ian McKellen reprised his role as Gandalf the Grey and was joined on the Hobbiton location by Martin Freeman, who remarked that the site "just looked like a place where people lived and where people worked".

== Visitor centre ==
Guided tours of the 5.5 hectares (14 acres) movie set site commenced in 2002 and continue to be provided daily. Highlights of the tour include Bagshot Row, the Party Tree, and Bilbo's Bag End home. There are now 44 hobbit holes on view although it is only possible to enter a few of them. Some have small, unfinished, earth-walled interiors, though two fully furnished hobbit hole interiors have opened in December 2023. (The interior of Bag End was shot in a studio in Wellington). The hobbit holes on site have been designed and built to one of three different scales. In addition to the smallest ones built to the correct size (hobbits are smaller than humans), some are built to a larger scale to make the hobbit actors appear smaller, and some have been constructed in a "dwarf" scale for scenes containing dwarves. Apart from a few exceptions, the colour of the front door indicates the scale, for example hobbit holes with a blue door are built to the correct scale for humans.

In 2012 the "Green Dragon" Inn (featured in The Lord of the Rings and Hobbit trilogies) was opened on the set as a fully functioning inn, serving beverages to visitors and hosting private banquets. Refreshments are also available at "The Shires Rest Cafe" prior to or after tours, where Breakfast and "Second Breakfast" is served. There is also a store selling merchandise and souvenirs adjacent to the cafe and evening events commenced in 2014. The tours have generally received good reviews. In 2013 the set welcomed its 500,000th guest.

In December 2023, two Hobbit holes were opened to the public for the first time, a project which took nine months to complete. The two holes are located on the Bagshot Row next to Sam Gamgee's home and feature fully realized themed interiors designed by Alan Lee and John Howe.

In September 2026, three stone Trolls - Tom, Bert, and William - were added to the experience, located in a bush between the Bagshot Row and the Green Dragon Inn. Based on their appearance in The Hobbit: An Unexpected Journey, the Trolls are proportionate to the "Hobbit" size of the visitors, the tallest of them standing 5.7 meters tall. The Trolls sit on a concrete foundation and have been aged up and covered in vegetation to achieve the appearance of being exposed to the elements for 77 years between An Unexpected Journey and The Fellowship of the Ring.

Tourism has had a large effect on the nearest town, Matamata, where the tour buses depart from. The influx of tourists has turned the town into a major tourist attraction, with many cafes and bars opening up to accommodate tourists. This has provided employment for the local townspeople.

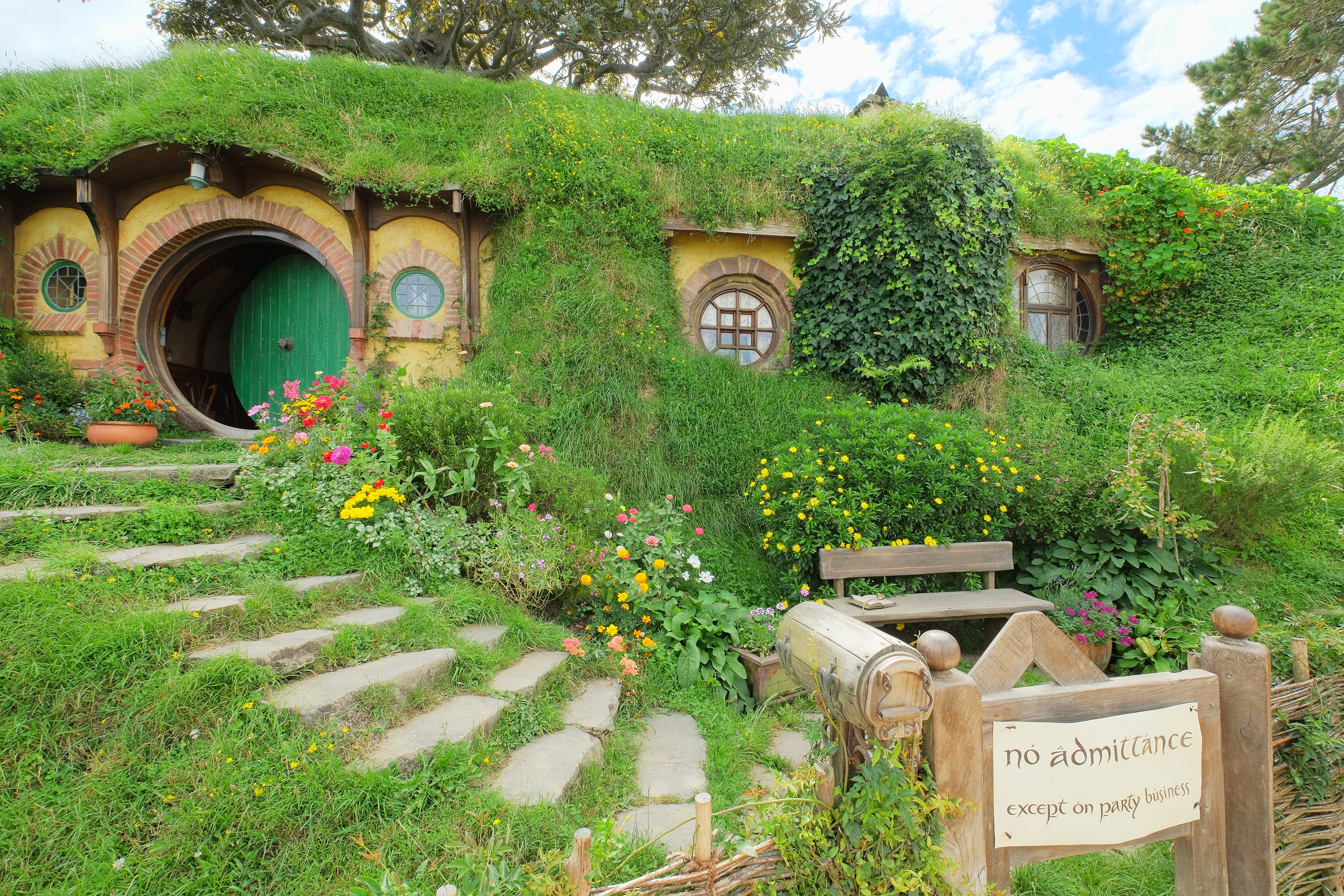
Peter Jackson said of the set, "It felt as if you could open the circular green door of Bag End and find Bilbo Baggins inside".

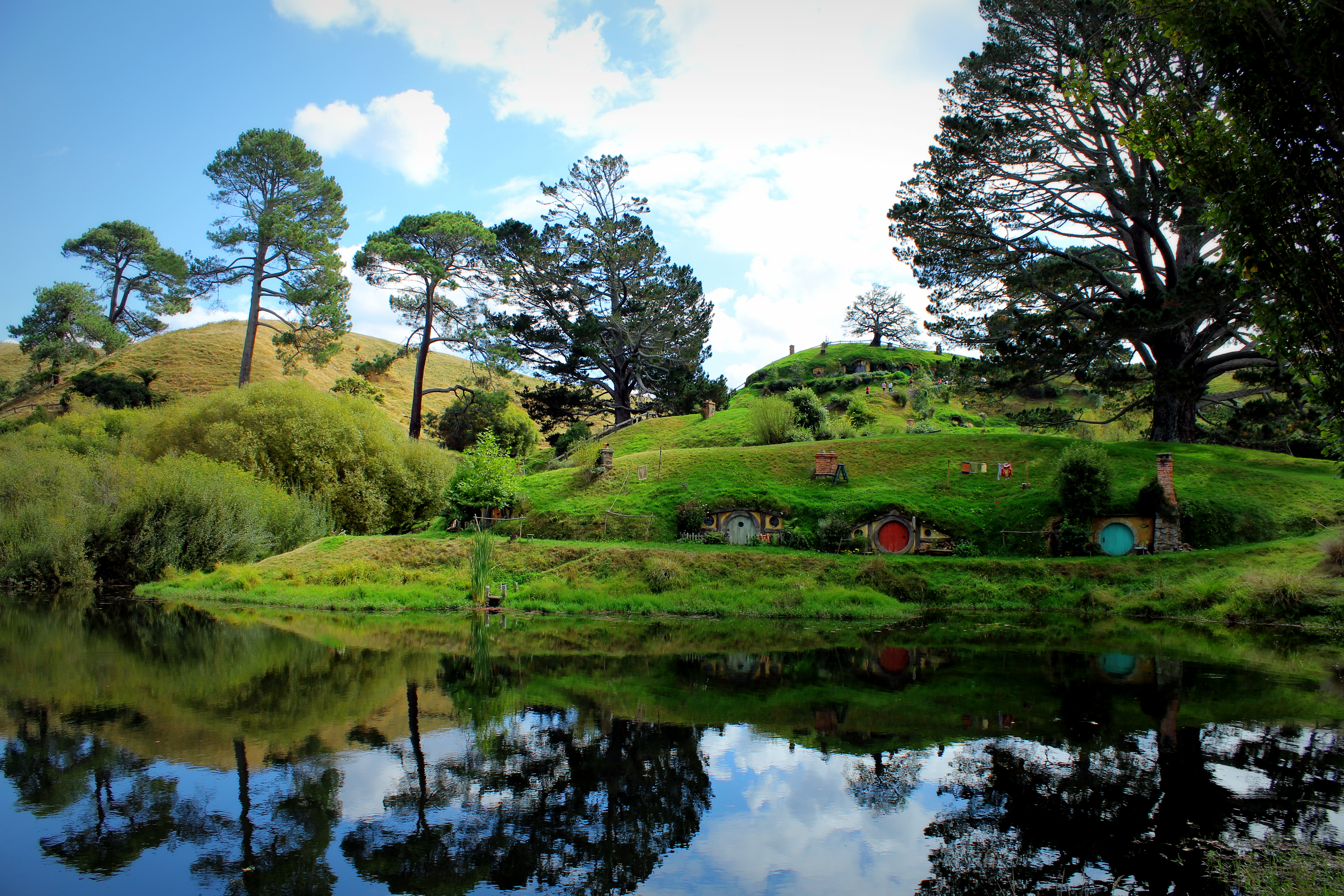
Hobbit holes overlooking the lake on the set

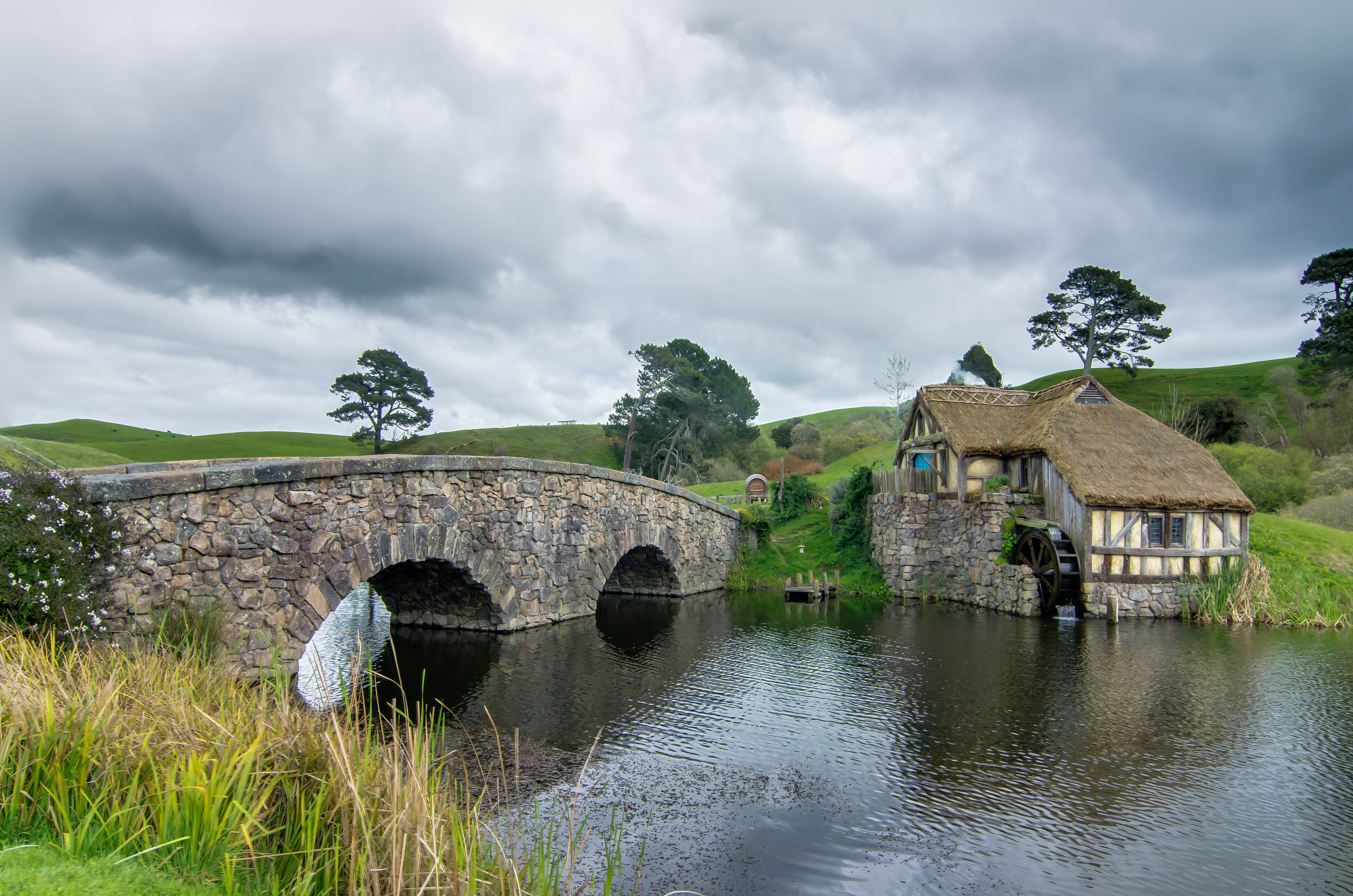
Hobbiton mill and double-arched bridge

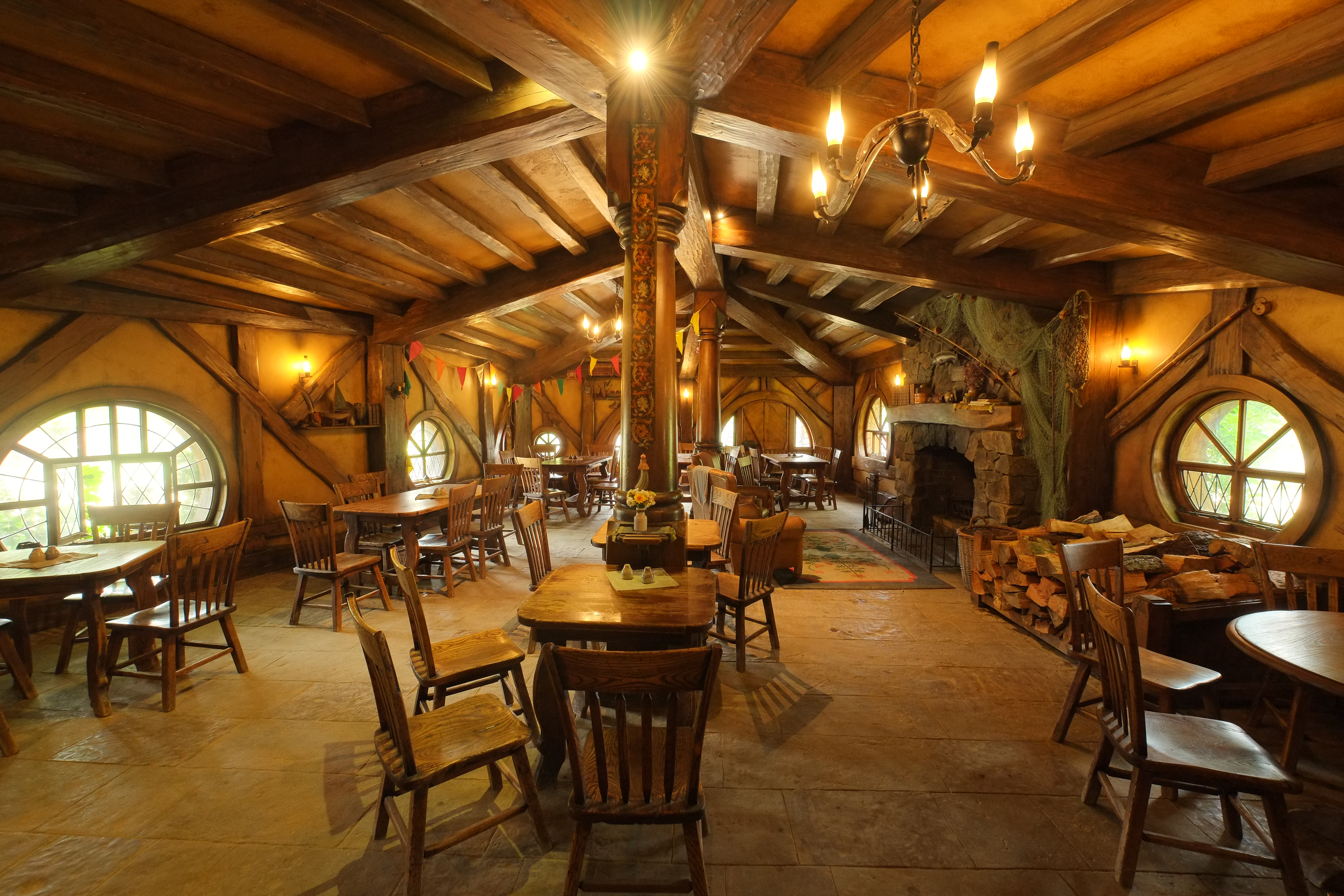
Interior of the Green Dragon inn

Inside a Hobbit-hole

Hillside hobbit holes at Hobbiton

== Bibliography ==
- Ian Brodie (2004) The Lord of the Rings Location Guidebook. (Extended Edition). HarperCollins. Auckland.
- Charles Rawlings-Way, Brett Atkinson, Sarah Bennett, Peter Dragicevich and Errol Hunt (2008) Lonely Planet New Zealand. Lonely Planet. Melbourne.
