= The Shire =

Fictional region of hobbits

- Middle-earth location
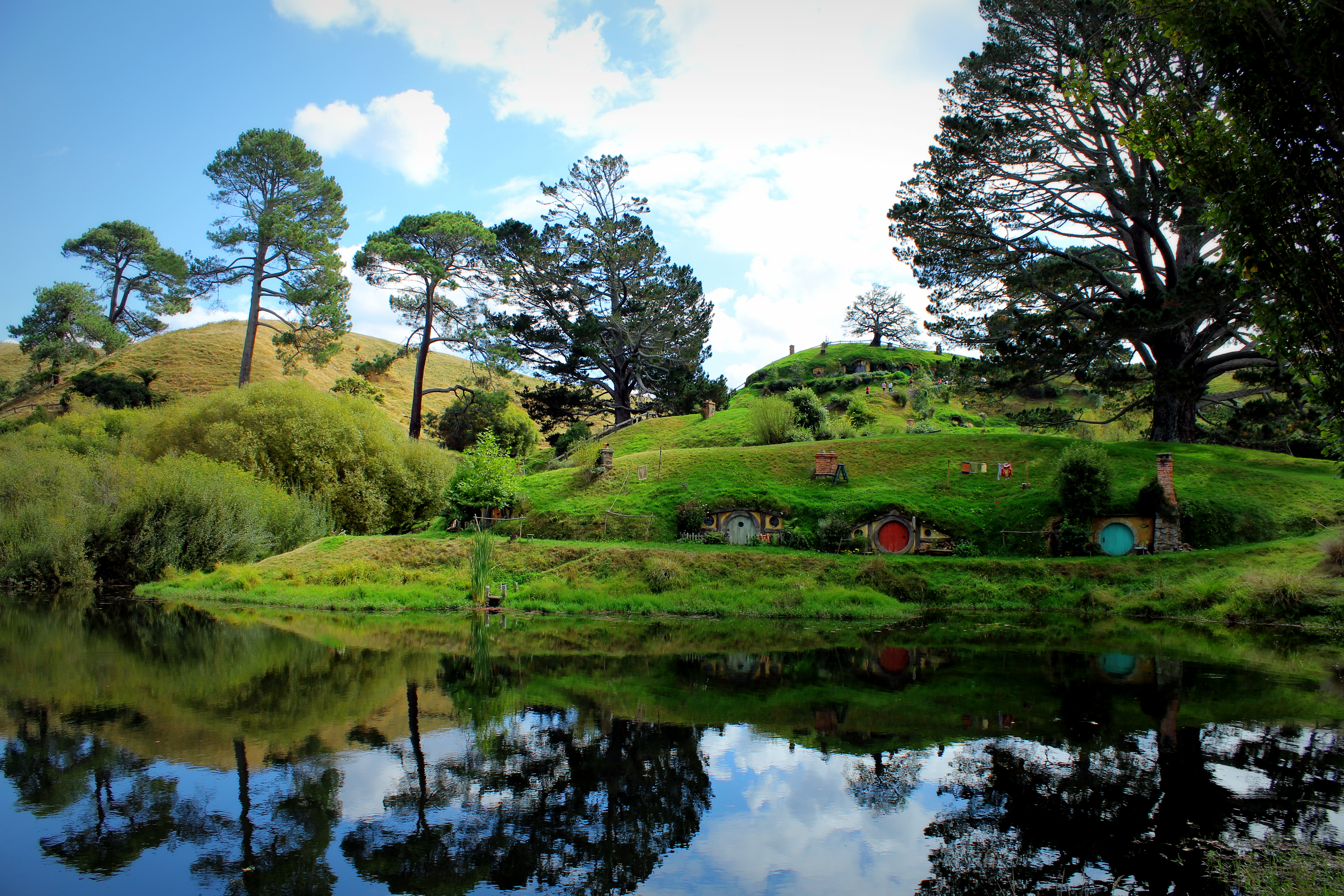
- Part of the Shire created for Peter Jackson's films of Middle-earth, on a farm near Matamata, New Zealand
- First appearance: The Hobbit
- Created by: J. R. R. Tolkien
- Genre: High fantasy

In-universe information
- Type: Region
- Ruled by: Thain, Mayor
- Ethnic groups: Harfoots, Stoors, Fallohides
- Race: Hobbits
- Location: Northwest of Middle-earth
- Characters: Bilbo Baggins; Frodo Baggins; Samwise Gamgee; Merry Brandybuck; Pippin Took
- Chief township: Michel Delving on the White Downs

The Shire is a region of J. R. R. Tolkien's fictional Middle-earth, described in The Lord of the Rings and other works. The Shire is an inland area settled exclusively by hobbits, the Shire-folk, largely sheltered from the goings-on in the rest of Middle-earth. It is in the northwest of the continent, in the region of Eriador and the Kingdom of Arnor.

The Shire is the scene of action at the beginning and end of Tolkien's The Hobbit and The Lord of the Rings. Five of the protagonists in these stories have their homeland in the Shire: Bilbo Baggins (the title character of The Hobbit), and four members of the Fellowship of the Ring: Frodo Baggins, Samwise Gamgee, Merry Brandybuck, and Pippin Took. At the end of The Hobbit, Bilbo returns to the Shire, only to find out that he has been declared "missing and presumed dead" and that his hobbit-hole and all its contents are up for auction. (He reclaims them, much to the spite of his cousins Otho and Lobelia Sackville-Baggins.) The main action in The Lord of the Rings returns to the Shire near the end of the book, in "The Scouring of the Shire", when the homebound hobbits find the area under the control of Saruman's ruffians, and set things to rights.

Tolkien based the Shire's landscapes, climate, flora, fauna, and place-names on Worcestershire and Warwickshire, the rural counties in England where he lived. In Peter Jackson's film adaptations of both The Hobbit and The Lord of the Rings, the Shire was represented by countryside and constructed hobbit-holes on a farm near Matamata in New Zealand, which became a tourist destination.

== Fictional description ==
Tolkien took considerable trouble over the exact details of the Shire. Little of his carefully crafted fictional geography, history, calendar, and constitution appeared in The Hobbit or The Lord of the Rings, though additional details were given in the Appendices of later editions. The Tolkien scholar Tom Shippey comments that all the same, they provided the "depth", the feeling in the reader's mind that this was a real and complex place, a quality that Tolkien believed essential to a successful fantasy.

=== Geography ===
==== Four farthings ====
In Tolkien's fiction, the Shire is described as a small but beautiful, idyllic and fruitful land, beloved by its hobbit inhabitants. They had agriculture but were not industrialized. The landscape included downland and woods like the English countryside. The Shire was fully inland; most hobbits feared the Sea. (Note: Tolkien 1954a, Prologue) The Shire measured 40 leagues (193 km, 120 miles) (Note: Tolkien takes a league to be 3 miles, see Unfinished Tales, The Disaster of the Gladden Fields, Appendix on Númenórean Measure.) east to west and 50 leagues (241 km, 150 miles) from north to south, with an area of some 18,000 square miles (47,000 km^{2}): (Note: Tolkien 1975, "Farthing", "Shire") roughly that of the English Midlands. The main and oldest part of the Shire was bordered to the east by the Brandywine River, on the north by uplands rising to the Hills of Evendim, on the west by the Far Downs, and on the south by marshland. It expanded to the east into Buckland between the Brandywine and the Old Forest, and (much later) to the west into the Westmarch between the Far Downs and the Tower Hills. (Note: Tolkien 1955, Appendix B and Appendix C.)

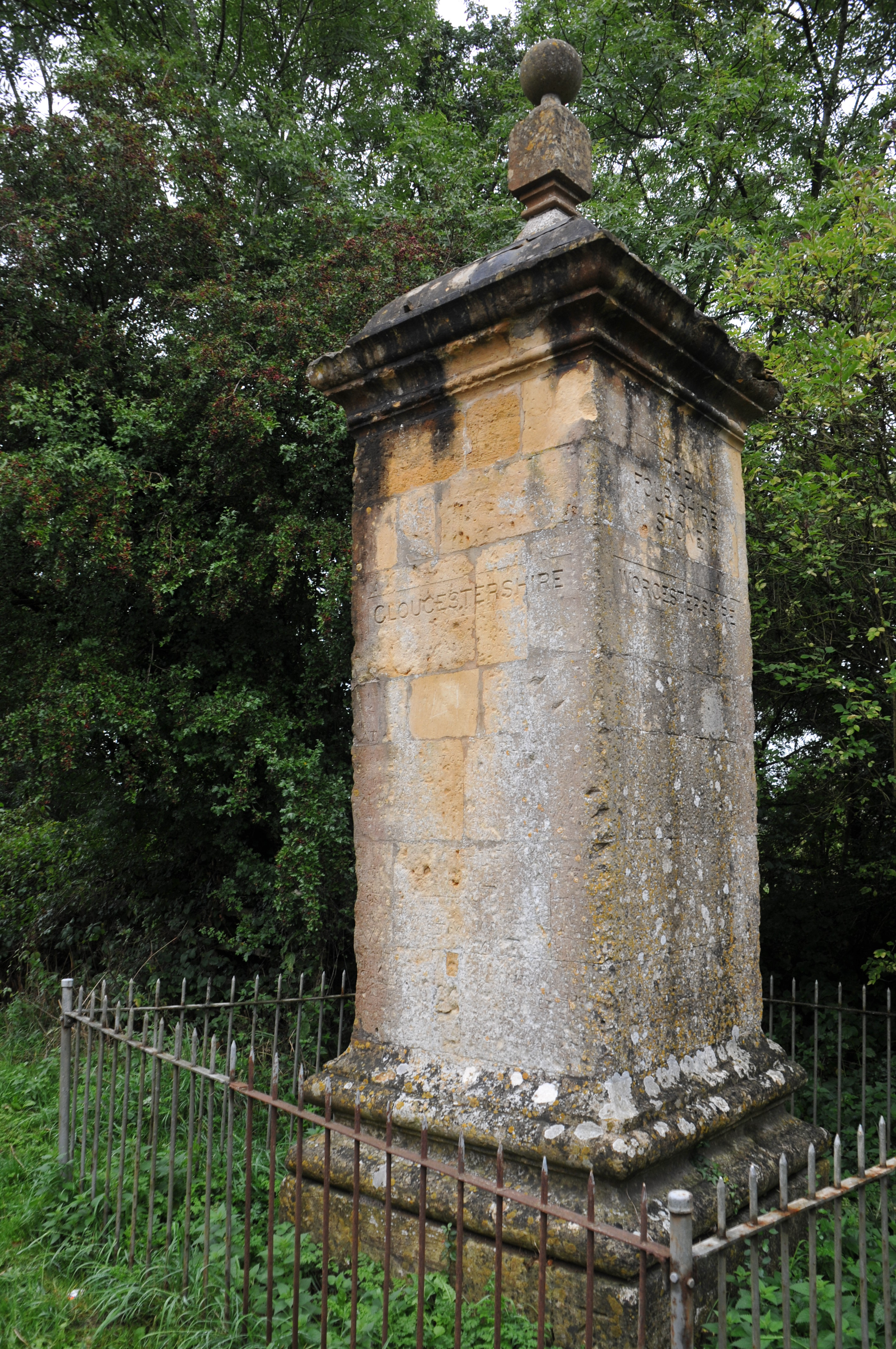
The Four Shire Stone, where four counties (Note: Warwickshire, Oxfordshire, Gloucestershire, and Worcestershire) of the West of England once met

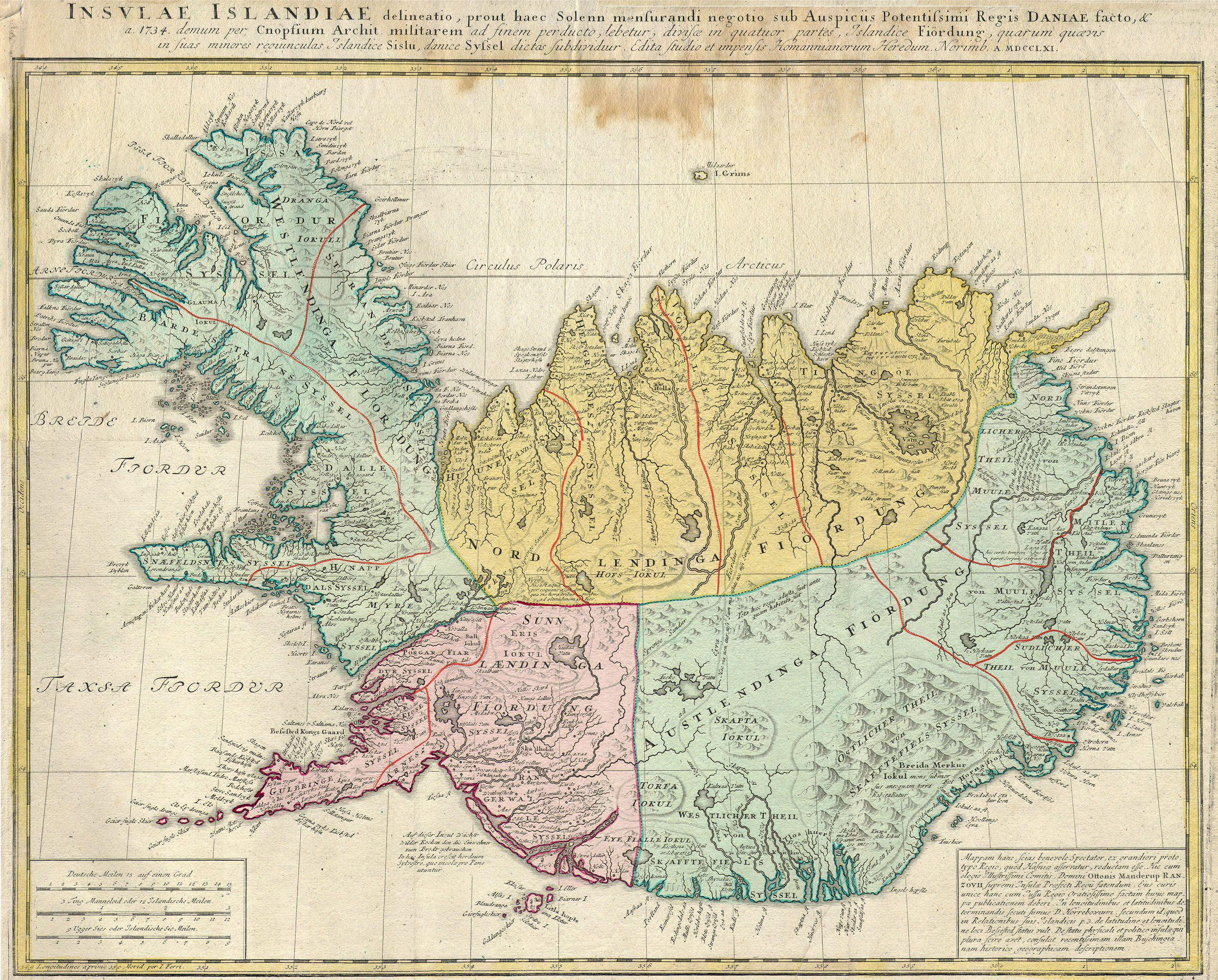
Iceland was once divided into four Farthings—North, South, East, and West.

The Shire was subdivided into four Farthings ("fourth-ings", "quarterings"), (Note: Tolkien 1954a, "Prologue" : "Of the Ordering of the Shire") as Iceland once was; similarly, Yorkshire was historically divided into three "ridings". The Three-Farthing Stone marked the approximate centre of the Shire. (Note: Tolkien 1954a, Map of a part of the Shire.) It was inspired by the Four Shire Stone near Moreton-in-Marsh, where once four counties met, but since 1931 only three do. (Note: Tom Shippey states that the placename Farthinghoe (in Northamptonshire) triggered Tolkien's thoughts on the matter.) There are several Three Shire Stones in England, such as in the Lake District, and formerly some Three Shires Oaks, such as at Whitwell in Derbyshire, each marking the place where three counties once met. Pippin was born in Whitwell in the Tookland. (Note: Tolkien 1955, book 5, ch. 1 "Minas Tirith") Within the Farthings there are unofficial clan homelands: the Tooks nearly all live in or near Tuckborough in Tookland's Green Hill Country. (Note: The Green Hill Country around the Tuckborough road may have been named for Green Hill Road near Mosely where Tolkien's grandparents lived.)

==== Buckland ====
Buckland, also known as the "East Marches", was just to the east of the Shire across the Brandywine River. Named for the Brandybuck family, it was settled "long ago" as "a sort of colony of the Shire." It was bounded to the east by the Old Forest, separated by a tall thick hedge called the High Hay. It included Crickhollow, which serves as one of Frodo's five Homely Houses.

The Westmarch or West Marches was given to the Shire by King Elessar after the War of the Ring. (Note: Tolkien 1955, Appendix B)

==== Bree ====
To the east of the Shire was the isolated village of Bree, unique in having hobbits and men living side-by-side. It was served by an inn named The Prancing Pony, (Note: Tolkien 1954a, book 1, ch. 9 "At the Sign of the Prancing Pony") noted for its fine beer which was sampled by hobbits, men, and the wizard Gandalf. (Note: Tolkien 1954a, book 2, ch. 2 "The Council of Elrond") Many inhabitants of Bree, including the inn's landlord Barliman Butterbur, had surnames taken from plants. Tolkien described the butterbur as "a fat thick plant", evidently chosen as appropriate for a fat man. (Note: Tolkien 1975, "Butterbur") Tolkien suggested two different origins for the people of Bree: either it had been founded and populated by men of the Edain who did not reach Beleriand in the First Age, remaining east of the mountains in Eriador; or they came from the same stock as the Dunlendings. (Note: Tolkien 1955, Appendix F) The name Bree means "hill"; Tolkien justified the name by arranging the village and the surrounding Bree-land around a large hill, named Bree-hill. The name of the village Brill, in Buckinghamshire, a place that Tolkien often visited, (Note: Tolkien 1988, ch. 7, p. 131, note 6. "Bree ... [was] based on Brill ... a place which he knew well".) and which inspired him to create Bree, has the same meaning: Brill is a modern contraction of Breʒ-hyll. Both syllables are words for "hill" – the first is Celtic and the second Old English.

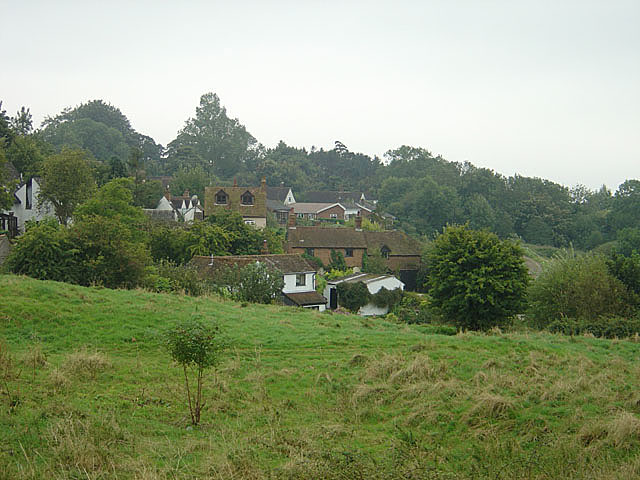
The name "Bree" was inspired by the name of the village of Brill, Buckinghamshire; it contains the Celtic Breʒ and the Old English hyll, both meaning "hill".

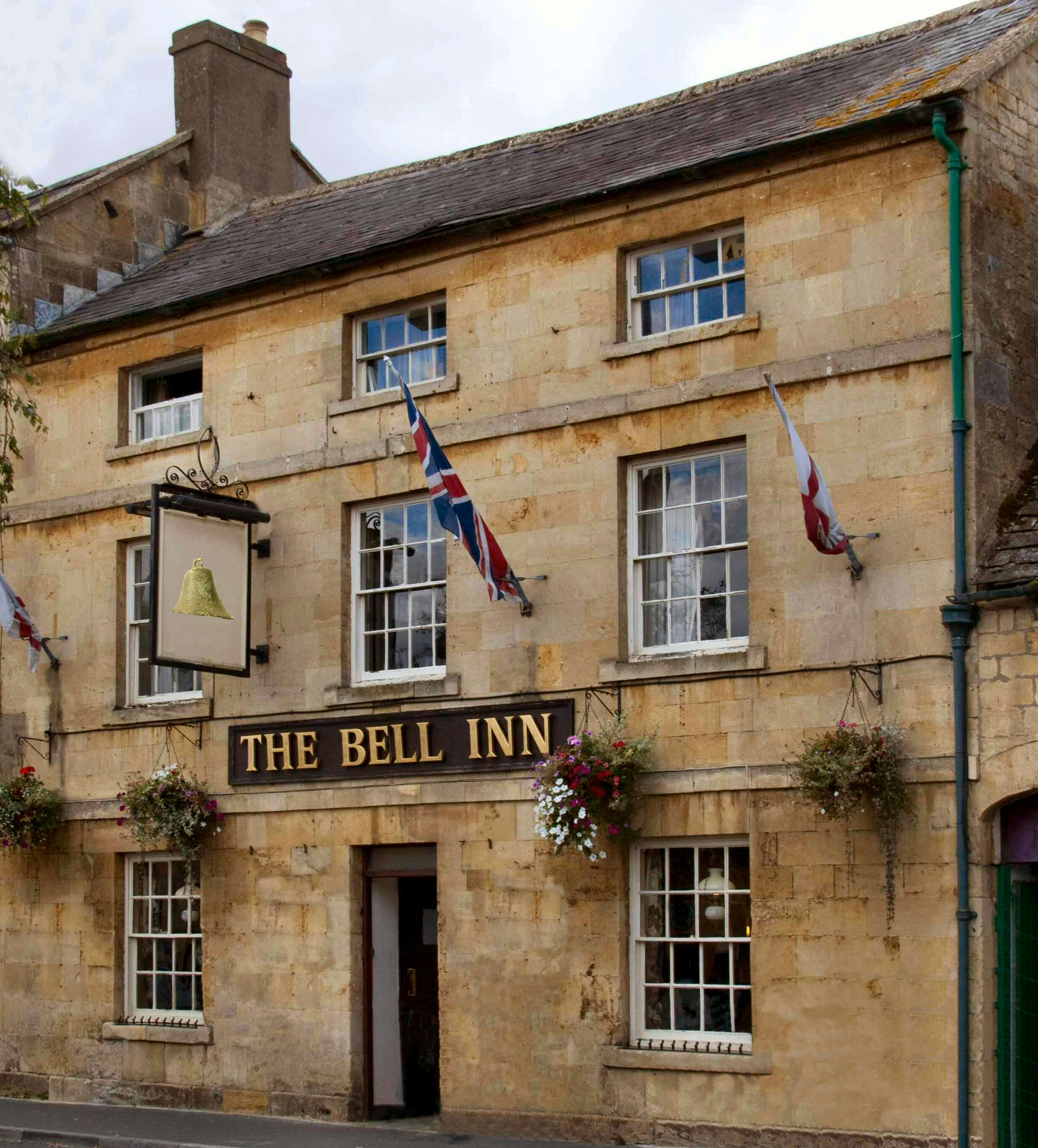
The Bell Inn in Moreton-in-Marsh may have inspired Tolkien to create The Prancing Pony inn at Bree.

=== History ===
The Shire was first settled by hobbits in the year 1601 of the Third Age (Year 1 in Shire Reckoning); they were led by the brothers Marcho and Blanco. The hobbits from the vale of Anduin had migrated west over the perilous Misty Mountains, living in the wilds of Eriador before moving to the Shire.

After the fall of Arnor, the Shire remained a self-governing realm; the Shire-folk chose a Thain to hold the king's powers. The first Thains were the heads of the Oldbuck clan. When the Oldbucks settled Buckland, the position of Thain was peacefully transferred to the Took clan. The Shire was covertly protected by Rangers of the North, who watched the borders and kept out intruders. Generally the only strangers entering the Shire were Dwarves travelling on the Great Road from their mines in the Blue Mountains, and occasional Elves on their way to the Grey Havens. In S.R. 1147 the hobbits defeated an invasion of Orcs at the Battle of Greenfields. In S.R. 1158–60, thousands of hobbits perished in the Long Winter and the famine that followed. (Note: Tolkien 1955, Appendix B, "Third Age") In the Fell Winter of S.R. 1311–12, white wolves from Forodwaith invaded the Shire across the frozen Brandywine River. (Note: Tolkien 1955, Appendix B, "Third Age")

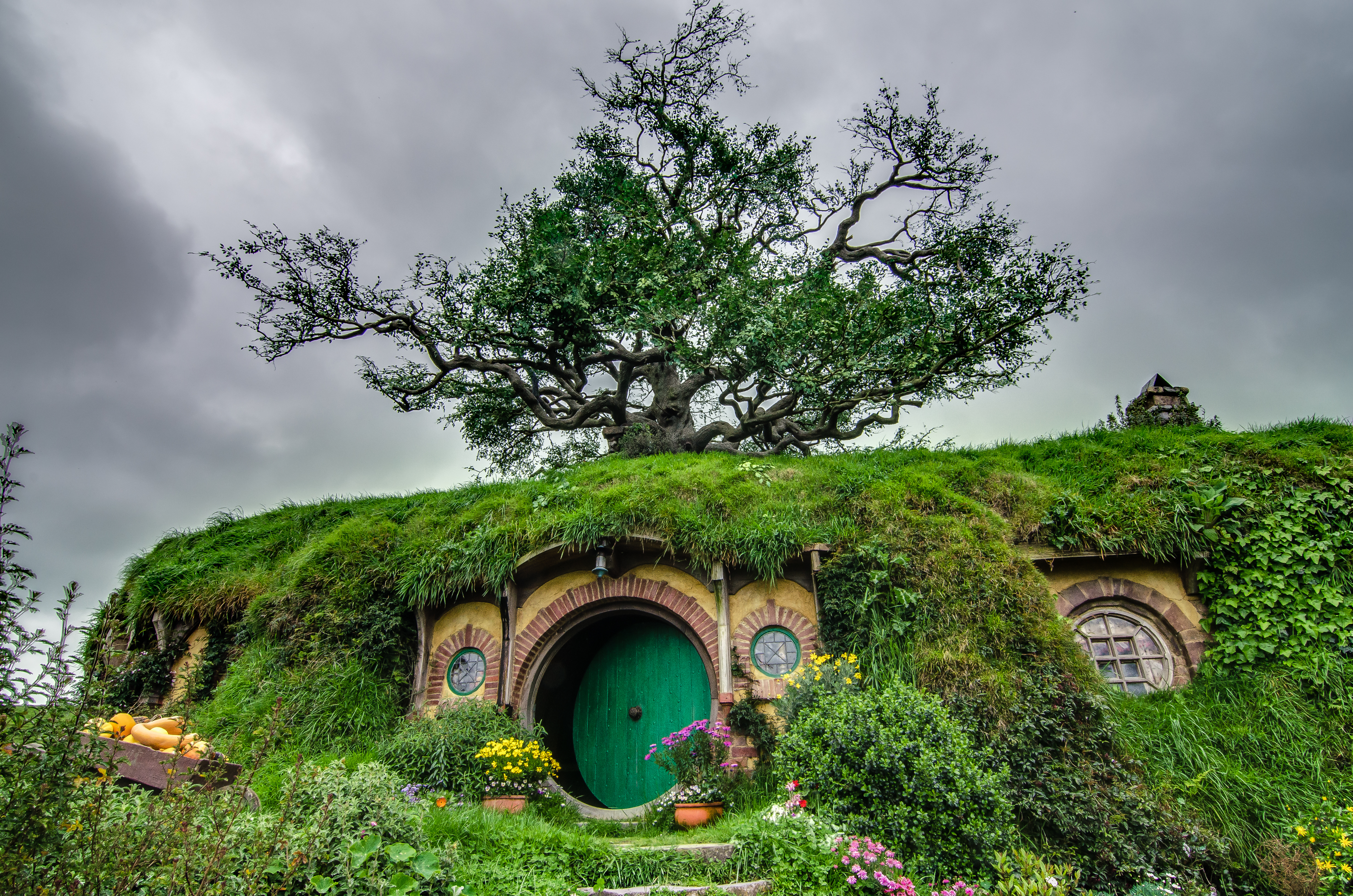
The house of Bilbo and later Frodo Baggins at Bag End, Hobbiton as filmed in New Zealand

The protagonists of The Hobbit and The Lord of the Rings, Bilbo and Frodo Baggins, lived at Bag End, (Note: "Bag End" was the real name of the Worcestershire home of Tolkien's aunt Jane Neave in Dormston.) a luxurious smial or hobbit-burrow, dug into The Hill on the north side of the town of Hobbiton in the Westfarthing. It was the most comfortable hobbit-dwelling in the town; there were smaller burrows further down The Hill. (Note: Tolkien's visualization of Bag End can be found in his illustrations for The Hobbit. His watercolour The Hill: Hobbiton-across-the Water shows the exterior and the surrounding countryside, whilst The Hall at Bag-End [sic] depicts the interior.) In S.R. 1341 Bilbo Baggins left the Shire on the quest recounted in The Hobbit. He returned the following year, secretly bearing a magic ring. This turned out to be the One Ring. The Shire was invaded by four Ringwraiths in search of the Ring. While Frodo, Sam, Merry, and Pippin were away on the quest to destroy the Ring, the Shire was taken over by Saruman through his underling Lotho Sackville-Baggins. They ran the Shire in a parody of a modern state, complete with armed ruffians, destruction of trees and handsome old buildings, and ugly industrialisation. (Note: Tolkien 1955, book 6, ch. 8 "The Scouring of the Shire")

The Shire was liberated with the help of Frodo and his companions on their return at the Battle of Bywater (the final battle of the War of the Ring). The trees of the Shire were restored with soil from Galadriel's garden in Lothlórien (a gift to Sam). The year S.R. 1420 was considered by the inhabitants of the Shire to be the most productive and prosperous year in their history. (Note: Tolkien 1955, book 6, ch. 9 "The Grey Havens")

=== Language ===
According to Tom Shippey, Tolkien invented parts of Middle-earth to resolve the linguistic puzzle he had accidentally created by using different European languages for those of peoples in his legendarium.

The hobbits of the Shire spoke Middle-earth's Westron or Common Speech. Tolkien however rendered their language as modern English in The Hobbit and in Lord of the Rings, just as he had used Old Norse names for the Dwarves. To resolve this linguistic puzzle, he created the fiction that the languages of parts of Middle-earth were "translated" into different European languages, inventing the language of the Riders of Rohan, Rohirric, to be "translated" again as the Mercian dialect of Old English which he knew well. (Note: Tolkien 1955, Appendix F, On Translation) This set up a relationship something like ancestry between Rohan and the Shire.

=== Government ===
The Shire had little in the way of government. The Mayor of the Shire's chief township, Michel Delving, was the chief official and was treated in practice as the Mayor of the Shire. There was a Message Service for post, and the 12 "Shirriffs" (three for each Farthing) of the Watch for police; their chief duties were rounding up stray livestock. These were supplemented by a varying number of "Bounders", (Note: "Bounder" here means a person who guards a boundary. The term is a pun; in Tolkien's time it also meant a dishonourable fellow.) an unofficial border force. At the time of The Lord of the Rings, there were many more Bounders than usual, one of the few signs for the hobbits of that troubled time. The heads of major families exerted authority over their own areas.

The Master of Buckland, hereditary head of the Brandybuck clan, ruled Buckland and had some authority over the Marish, just across the Brandywine River.

Similarly, the head of the Took clan, often called "The Took", ruled the ancestral Took dwelling of Great Smials, the village of Tuckborough, and the area of The Tookland. He held the largely ceremonial office of Thain of the Shire.

=== Calendar ===
Tolkien devised the "Shire calendar" or "Shire Reckoning" supposedly used by the Shire's hobbits on Bede's medieval calendar. In his fiction, it was created in Rhovanion hundreds of years before the Shire was founded. When hobbits migrated into Eriador, they took up the Kings' Reckoning, but maintained their old names of the months. In the "King's Reckoning", the year began on the winter solstice. After migrating further to the Shire, the hobbits created the "Shire Reckoning", in which Year 1 corresponded to the foundation of the Shire in the year 1601 of the Third Age by Marcho and Blanco. (Note: Tolkien 1955, "Appendix D: Calendars") The Shire's calendar year has 12 months, each of 30 days. Five non-month days are added to create a 365-day year. The two Yuledays signify the turn of the year, so each year begins on 2 Yule. The Lithedays are the three non-month days at midsummer, 1 Lithe, Mid-year's Day, and 2 Lithe. In leap years (every fourth year except centennial years) an Overlithe day is added after Mid-year's Day. There are seven days in the Shire week. The first day of the week is Sterday and the last is Highday. The Mid-year's Day and, when present, Overlithe have no weekday assignments. This causes every day to have the same weekday designation from year to year, instead of changing as in the Gregorian calendar.

For the names of the months, Tolkien reconstructed Anglo-Saxon names, his take on what the English would be if it had not adopted Latin names for the months such as January and March. In The Hobbit and The Lord of the Rings, the names of months and week-days are given in modern equivalents, so Afteryule is called "January" and Sterday is called "Saturday".

Month number	Shire Reckoning	Bede's Anglo- Saxon calendar	Meaning	Approximate Gregorian dates
	2 Yule		22 December	
1	Afteryule	Æfterra Gēola	After Christmas	23 December to 21 January
2	Solmath	Sol-mōnaþ	[Offering of] Cakes month	22 January to 20 February
3	Rethe	Hrēþ-mōnaþ	The goddess Hretha's month	21 February to 22 March
4	Astron	Easter-mōnaþ	Easter month	23 March to 21 April
5	Thrimidge	Þrimilce-mōnaþ	Thrice-milking month	22 April to 21 May
6	Forelithe	Ǣrra-Līða	Before the Solstice	22 May to 20 June
	1 Lithe		21 June	
	Mid-year's Day		22 June	
	Overlithe		Leap day	
	2 Lithe		23 June	
7	Afterlithe	Æftera Līþa	After the Solstice	24 June to 23 July
8	Wedmath	Weod-mōnaþ	Weed Month	24 July to 22 August
9	Halimath	Hālig-mōnaþ	Holy [Rites] Month	23 August to 21 September
10	Winterfilth	Winterfylleth	Winter Fulfilment	22 September to 21 October
11	Blotmath	Blōt-mōnaþ	Blood Month (Note: i.e. slaughtering of livestock, or Sacrificial Month (cf. Old Norse blót)	22 October to 20 November
12	Foreyule	Ærra Gēola	Before Christmas	21 November to 20 December
	1 Yule		21 December	

== Inspiration ==
=== A calque upon England ===
Shippey writes that not only is the Shire reminiscent of England: Tolkien carefully constructed the Shire as an element-by-element calque upon England. (Note: For another of Tolkien's calques analysed by Shippey, see The Silmarillion § Themes.)

Tom Shippey's analysis of Tolkien's calque of the Shire upon England
Element	The Shire	England
Origin of people	The Angle between the Rivers Hoarwell (Mitheithel) and the Loudwater (Bruinen) from the East (across Eriador)	The Angle between Flensburg Fjord and the Schlei, from the East (across the North Sea), hence the name "England"
Original three tribes	Stoors, Harfoots, Fallohides	Angles, Saxons, Jutes (Note: Shippey comments that both nations have forgotten their origins.)
Legendary founders named "horse" (Note: Old English: hengest, stallion; hors, horse; *marh, horse, cf "mare"; blanca, white horse in Beowulf)	Marcho and Blanco	Hengest and Horsa
Length of civil peace	272 years from Battle of Greenfields to Battle of Bywater	270 years from Battle of Sedgemoor to Lord of the Rings
Organisation	Mayors, moots, Shirriffs	Like "an old-fashioned and idealised England"
Surnames	e.g. Banks, Boffin, Bolger, Bracegirdle, Brandybuck, Brockhouse, Chubb, Cotton, Fairbairns, Grubb, Hayward, Hornblower, Noakes, Proudfoot, Took, Underhill, Whitfoot	All are real English surnames. Tolkien comments e.g. that 'Bracegirdle' is "used in the text, of course, with reference to the hobbit tendency to be fat and so to strain their belts". (Note: Tolkien, J. R. R. (1967) "Guide to the Names in The Lord of the Rings". Available in A Tolkien Compass (1975) and in The Lord of the Rings: A Reader's Companion (2005), and online at Guide to the Names in The Lord of the Rings on Academia.edu.)
Place-names	e.g. "Nobottle" e.g. "Buckland"	Nobottle, Northamptonshire; Buckland, Oxfordshire

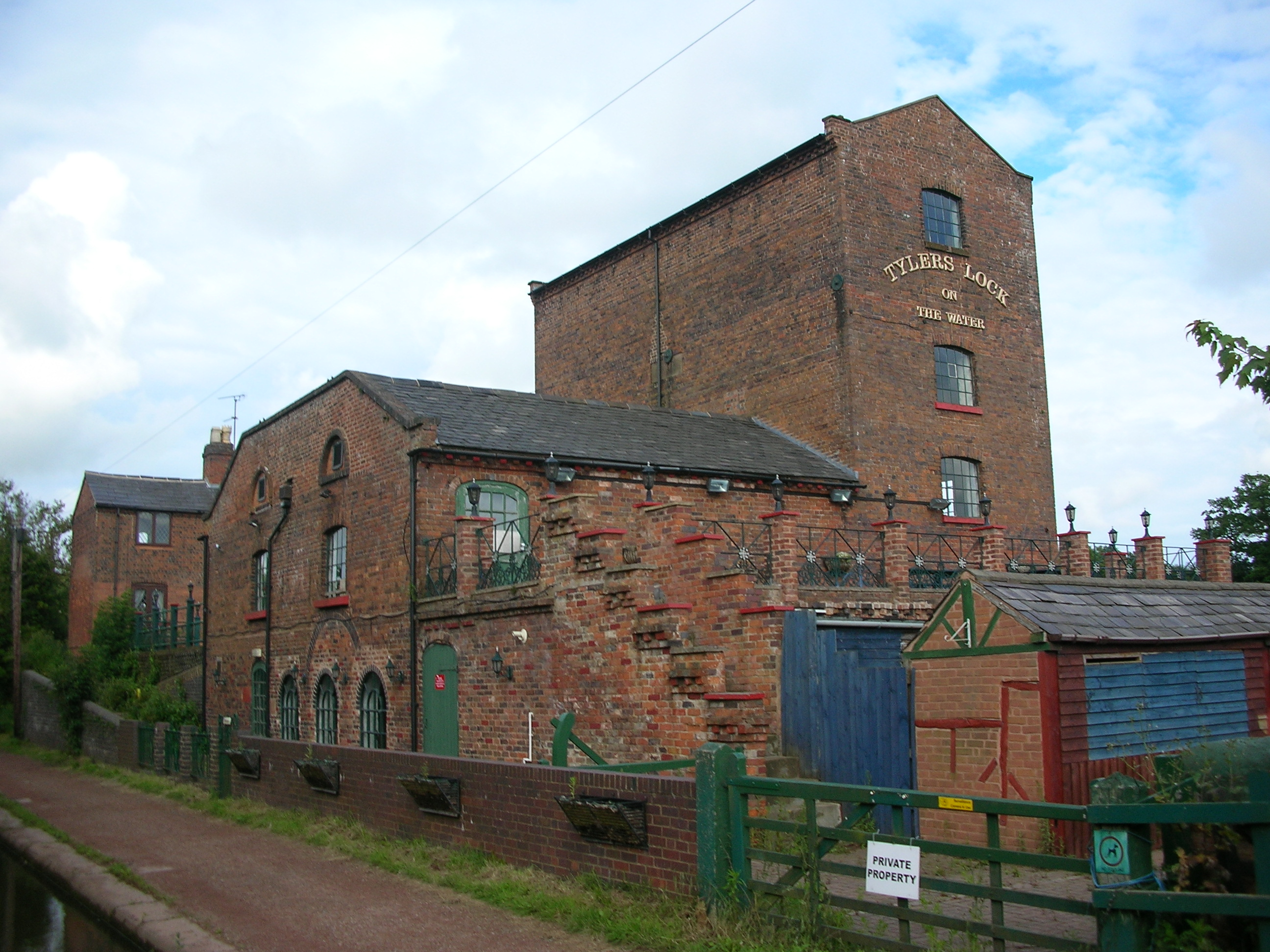
Industrial buildings by the Worcester and Birmingham Canal near Tardebigge, Worcestershire

There are other connections; Tolkien equated the latitude of Hobbiton with that of Oxford (i.e., around 52° N). (Note: Carpenter 2023, Letters #294 to C. & D. Plimmer, 8 February 1967) The Shire corresponds roughly to the West Midlands region of England in the remote past, extending to Warwickshire and Worcestershire (where Tolkien grew up), forming in Shippey's words a "cultural unit with deep roots in history". The name of the Northamptonshire village of Farthinghoe triggered the idea of dividing the Shire into Farthings. Tolkien said that pipe-weed "flourishes only in warm sheltered places like Longbottom;" in the seventeenth century, the Evesham area of Worcestershire was well known for its tobacco.

=== Homely names ===
Tolkien made the Shire feel homely and English in a variety of ways, from names such as Bagshot Row (Note: Bagshot is a village in Surrey, and sounds as if it is connected to Baggins and Bag End.) and the Mill to country pubs with familiar names such as "The Green Dragon" in Bywater, (Note: There was a Green Dragon pub in St Aldate's in Oxford in Tolkien's time.) "The Ivy Bush" near Hobbiton on the Bywater Road, (Note: There is an Ivy Bush pub on the Hagley Road near where Tolkien lived in Birmingham.) and "The Golden Perch" in Stock, famous for its fine beer. Michael Stanton comments in the J.R.R. Tolkien Encyclopedia that the Shire is based partly on Tolkien's childhood at Sarehole, partly on English village life in general with, in Tolkien's words, "gardens, trees, and unmechanized farmland". (Note: Carpenter 2023, Letters #213 to Deborah Webster, 25 October 1958) The Shire's largest town, Michel Delving, embodies a philological pun: the name sounds much like that of an English country town, but means "Much Digging" of hobbit-holes, from Old English micel, "great" and delfan, "to dig".

=== Childhood experience ===
The industrialization of the Shire was based on Tolkien's childhood experience of the blighting of the Worcestershire and Warwickshire countryside by the spread of heavy industry as the city of Birmingham grew. (Note: Tolkien 1954a, "Foreword to the Second Edition") The Tolkien family's relocation from Sarehole to Moseley and Kings Heath in 1901, and then again to Edgbaston in 1902, moved them steadily closer to the industry of central Birmingham. Humphrey Carpenter comments in J. R. R. Tolkien: A Biography that the views of Moseley were a sad contrast to the Warwickshire countryside of his youth.

"To have just at the age when imagination is opening out, suddenly find yourself in a quiet Warwickshire village, I think it engenders a particular love of what you might call central Midlands English countryside." – J. R. R. Tolkien, BBC interview with Denys Gueroult, 1964

"The Scouring of the Shire", involving a rebellion of the hobbits and the restoration of the pre-industrial Shire, can be read as containing an element of wish-fulfilment on his part, complete with Merry's magic horn to rouse the inhabitants to action.

== Adaptations ==
=== Film ===
The Shire makes an appearance in both the 1977 The Hobbit and the 1978 The Lord of the Rings animated films.

In Peter Jackson's The Lord of the Rings motion picture trilogy, the Shire appeared in both The Fellowship of the Ring and The Return of the King. The Shire scenes were shot at a location near Matamata, New Zealand. Following the shooting, the area was returned to its natural state, but even without the set from the movie the area became a prime tourist location. Because of bad weather, 18 of 37 hobbit-holes could not immediately be bulldozed; before work could restart, they were attracting over 12,000 tourists per year to Ian Alexander's farm, where Hobbiton and Bag End had been situated.

Jackson revisited the Shire for his films The Hobbit: An Unexpected Journey and The Hobbit: The Battle of the Five Armies. The Shire scenes were shot at the same location.

=== Games ===
In the 2006 real-time strategy game The Lord of the Rings: The Battle for Middle Earth II, the Shire appears as both a level in the evil campaign where the player invades in control of a goblin army, and as a map in the game's multiplayer skirmish mode.

In the 2007 MMORPG The Lord of the Rings Online, the Shire appears almost in its entirety as one of the major regions of the game. The Shire is inhabited by hundreds of non-player characters, and the player can get involved in hundreds of quests. The only portions of the original map by Christopher Tolkien that are missing from the game are some parts of the West Farthing and the majority of the South Farthing. A portion of the North Farthing also falls within the in-game region of Evendim for game play purposes.

In the 2009 action game The Lord of the Rings: Conquest, the Shire appears as one of the game's battlegrounds during the evil campaign, where it is razed by the forces of Mordor.

Games Workshop produced a supplement in 2004 for The Lord of the Rings Strategy Battle Game entitled The Scouring of the Shire. This supplement contained rules for a large number of miniatures that depicted the Shire after the War of the Ring had concluded.

== Sources ==
- Carpenter, Humphrey, ed. (2023) [1981]. The Letters of J. R. R. Tolkien: Revised and Expanded Edition. New York: HarperCollins. ISBN 978-0-35-865298-4.
- Shippey, Tom (2005) [1982]. The Road to Middle-Earth: How J. R. R. Tolkien Created a New Mythology (Third ed.). HarperCollins. ISBN 978-0-261-10275-0.
- Stanton, Michael N. (2013) [2007]. "Shire, The". In Drout, Michael D. C. (ed.). The J. R. R. Tolkien Encyclopedia: Scholarship and Critical Assessment. Routledge. pp. 607–608. ISBN 978-0415865111.
- Tolkien, J. R. R. (1975). "Guide to the Names in The Lord of the Rings". In Lobdell, Jared (ed.). A Tolkien Compass. Open Court. ISBN 978-0-8754-8303-0.
- Tolkien, J. R. R. (1954a). The Fellowship of the Ring. The Lord of the Rings. Boston: Houghton Mifflin. OCLC 9552942.
- Tolkien, J. R. R. (1955). The Return of the King. The Lord of the Rings. Boston: Houghton Mifflin. OCLC 519647821.
- Tolkien, J. R. R. (1988). Christopher Tolkien (ed.). The Return of the Shadow. Boston: Houghton Mifflin. ISBN 978-0-395-49863-7.
