= Narrative structure of The Lord of the Rings =

Literary device in Tolkien's fiction

Scholars have described the narrative structure of The Lord of the Rings, a high fantasy work by J. R. R. Tolkien published in 1954–55, in a variety of ways, including as a balanced pair of outer and inner quests; a linear sequence of scenes or tableaux; a fractal arrangement of separate episodes; a Gothic cathedral-like edifice of many different elements; multiple cycles or spirals; or an elaborate medieval-style interlacing of intersecting threads of story. Also present is an elaborate symmetry between pairs of characters.

The first volume, The Fellowship of the Ring, has a different structure from the rest of the novel. It has attracted attention both for its sequence of five "Homely Houses", safe places where the Hobbit protagonists may recuperate after a dangerous episode, and for its arrangement as a single narrative thread focused on its protagonist, Frodo, interrupted by two long but critically important flashback narrative chapters.

== Context ==
J. R. R. Tolkien (1892–1973) was an English Roman Catholic writer, poet, philologist, and academic, best known as the author of the high fantasy works The Hobbit and The Lord of the Rings.

In 1954–55, The Lord of the Rings was published. In 1957, it was awarded the International Fantasy Award. The publication of the Ace Books and Ballantine paperbacks in the United States helped it to become immensely popular with a new generation in the 1960s. The book has remained so ever since, ranking as one of the most popular works of fiction of the twentieth and twentyfirst centuries, judged by both sales and reader surveys. In the 2003 "Big Read" survey conducted by the BBC in the United Kingdom, The Lord of the Rings was found to be the "Nation's best-loved book." In similar 2004 polls both Germany and Australia also found The Lord of the Rings to be their favourite book. In a 1999 poll of Amazon.com customers, The Lord of the Rings was judged to be their favourite "book of the millennium." The popularity of The Lord of the Rings increased further when Peter Jackson's film trilogy came out in 2001–2003.

== Overall structure ==
Tolkien scholars have noted the unusual narrative structure of The Lord of the Rings, describing it in a variety of ways, including as a balanced pair of outer and inner quests; a linear sequence of scenes or static tableaux; a fractal arrangement of separate episodes that successively elaborate upon recurring themes; a Gothic cathedral-like edifice of many different elements that combine to create a space with varying lights and vistas; or an elaborate medieval-style interlacing of intersecting threads of story.

=== Balance of outer and inner quests ===
The critic Nicholas Birns proposes that The Lord of the Rings consists of two quests, balanced against each other. The outer or main quest is the visible one, to destroy the One Ring, and it occupies the greater part of the book. The inner or moral quest is described in the book's penultimate chapter, "The Scouring of the Shire". This second quest is revealed when Frodo and the Hobbits return home to the Shire to find it despoiled and industrialised by Sharkey's men. The Hobbits, equipped by the outer quest to deal with such a crisis, raise the Shire and restore it to its rural perfection. Another critic, Bernhard Hirsch, notes the "considerable critical debate" around the chapter, and that Tolkien stated in his foreword that he had "foreseen from the outset" that the book would have as its formal structure a journey outward for the main quest and a journey home.

Formal structure of The Lord of the Rings: narrative arcs balancing the main text on the quest to destroy the One Ring in Mordor with Frodo's moral quest in "The Scouring of the Shire"

=== Linear sequence of tableaux, and a quest ===
The humanities scholar Brian Rosebury stated in 2003 that The Lord of the Rings is both a quest – a story with heroes and a goal, to destroy the Ring – and a journey, an expansive tour of Middle-earth through a series of tableaux that filled readers with delight; and the two support each other. Rosebury commented that much of the work, especially Book 1, is largely descriptive rather than plot-based; it focuses mainly on Middle-earth itself, taking a journey through a series of tableaux – in the Shire, in the Old Forest, with Tom Bombadil, and so on. He stated that "The circumstantial expansiveness of Middle-earth itself is central to the work's aesthetic power".

Alongside this slow descriptiveness is the quest to destroy the Ring, a unifying plotline. The Ring needs to be destroyed to save Middle-earth itself from destruction or domination by Sauron. Hence, Rosebury argued, the book does have a single focus: Middle-earth itself. The work builds up Middle-earth as a place that readers come to love, shows that it is under dire threat, and – with the destruction of the Ring – provides the "eucatastrophe" for a happy ending. That defines the work as "comedic" rather than "tragic", in classical terms; but it also embodies the inevitability of loss, as the elves, hobbits, and the rest decline and fade. Even the least novelistic parts of the work, the chronicles, narratives, and essays of the appendices, help to build a consistent image of Middle-earth. The work is thus, Rosebury asserted, very tightly constructed, the expansiveness and plot fitting together exactly.

Diagram of Brian Rosebury's analysis of The Lord of the Rings as a combined quest (to destroy the Ring) and journey (as a series of Tableaux of places in Middle-earth); the two support each other, and must interlock tightly to do so.

=== Interlacing ===
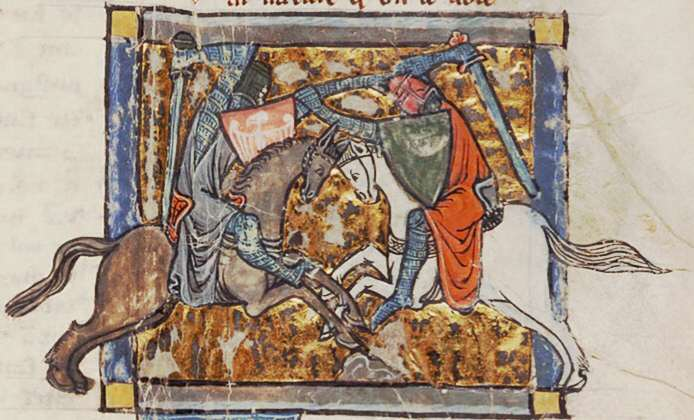
The Lord of the Rings uses many themes of medieval romance (Yvain, le Chevalier au Lion illustrated), such as heroism and interlacing.

In the second and third volumes of The Lord of the Rings, Tolkien employed an unusual and complex narrative structure, interlacing or entrelacement, also called a "tapestry romance". Known from medieval French literature, it involves following one character or group of characters at a time, with no information about what all the other characters are doing until the narrative switches over to them. Interlacing enabled Tolkien to achieve a variety of literary effects: maintaining suspense; keeping the reader uncertain of what will happen and even of what is happening to other characters at the same time in the story; and creating both surprise and an ongoing feeling of bewilderment and disorientation. More subtly, the leapfrogging of the timeline by the different story threads allowed Tolkien to make hidden connections that can only be grasped retrospectively, as the reader realises on reflection that certain events happened at the same time, and that these connections imply a contest of good and evil powers.

The scholar of literature George H. Thomson wrote: "What must interest the student of the novel is the way Tolkien has been able to combine a very nearly complete catalogue of [medieval] romance themes (many of them extraordinary in the highest degree) with an elaborate, capacious, immensely flexible plot structure and make of the whole a coherent and convincing modern prose narrative."

Major interlacings of The Lord of the Rings across its 6 "books", with their original titles, showing contrasts, parallels, and prolonged gaps
Character	1 The First Journey		2 The Journey of the Nine Companions		3 The Treason of Isengard	4 The Journey of the Ring-bearers	5 The War of the Ring	6 The end of the Third Age		
Frodo, Sam	travel to Bree	travel to Rivendell	the nine meet up, go south			travel towards Mordor		travel to Mount Doom	the friends meet again	Hobbits scour the Shire
Merry	travel to Bree	travel to Rivendell	the nine meet up, go south		awaken the Ents to Isengard		swears fealty to Theoden; Battle of the Pelennor Fields		the friends meet again	Hobbits scour the Shire
Pippin	travel to Bree	travel to Rivendell	the nine meet up, go south		awaken the Ents to Isengard		swears fealty to Denethor	Battle of the Morannon	the friends meet again	Hobbits scour the Shire
Aragorn	meets the Hobbits	travel to Rivendell	the nine meet up, go south		travel to Rohan; Battle of Helm's Deep		Battle of the Pelennor Fields	Battle of the Morannon	the friends meet again	
Legolas, Gimli			the nine meet up, go south		travel to Rohan; Battle of Helm's Deep		Battle of the Pelennor Fields	Battle of the Morannon	the friends meet again	
Gandalf	advises Frodo, hurries off		the nine meet up, go south	dies in Moria	reappears; awakens Rohan to Isengard		alerts allies	Battle of the Morannon	the friends meet again	
Boromir			the nine meet up, go south	dies at Parth Galen						
Gollum			(glimpsed in pursuit)			pursues Frodo and the Ring		pursues Frodo; destroys Ring, himself		

=== Non-linear ===
The scholar E. L. Risden argued that Tolkien strongly resisted a linear structure for The Lord of the Rings. He writes that the work instead uses narrative techniques that he metaphorically calls "fractal" and "Gothic". Risden quoted the director of The Lord of the Rings film trilogy, Peter Jackson, as saying that The Fellowship of the Ring was the easiest to film, as it was mainly linear; the other two volumes, being interlaced, presented the filmmaker with much greater challenges.

==== Fractal ====
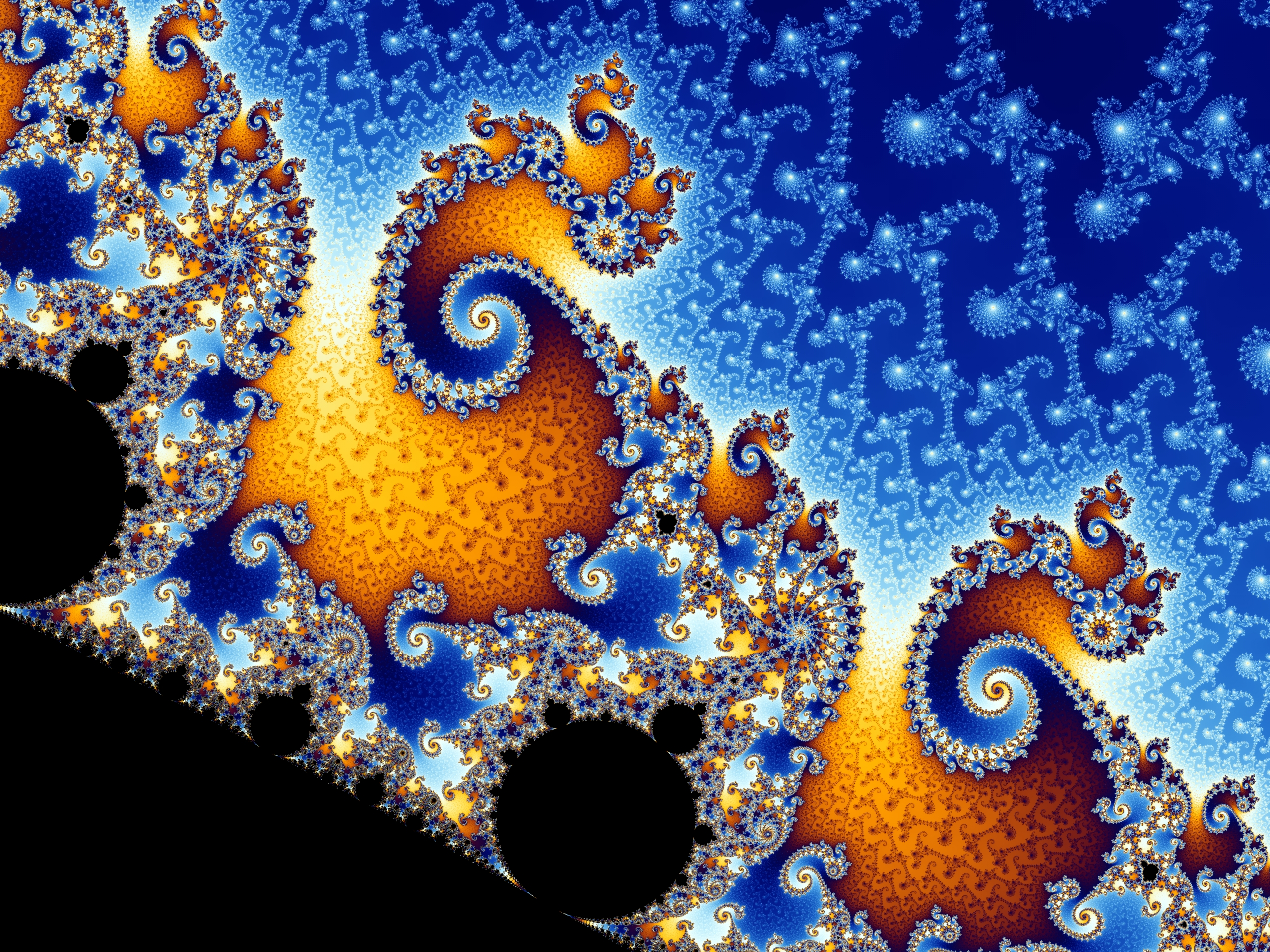
The work's structure has been compared to fractals, which unfold and gain complexity by splintering lines and shapes into infinitely complex patterns.

Scholars including Michael Drout and Risden have called the narrative structure "fractal". Drout was alluding to the multiple "stress and release" episodes, all different but repeating a pattern. Risden gave as an example of fractal description the work's combination of text with maps and a mass of names. These imply to the reader, he wrote, quoting Shippey, that Tolkien's approach indicated "that there is a world outside the story, that the story is only a selection" from Middle-earth's near-infinite undescribed diversity.

Risden wrote that "as fractal the narrative moves episodically or incrementally, guided by one or more 'strange attractors', unfolding, varying, gaining complexity." He saw Tolkien's development of Frodo's "Homely House" as a "fractal development": it begins as Bilbo's Bag End, a perfect home and base for an adventure, and "fractally" adapts to play the same role, but for Frodo and his quest. The Homely House reappears as the little Hobbit-house at Crickhollow, still much like Bag End and still inside the Shire, but now nearer to the wild. Its next incarnation is Tom Bombadil's house, again full of the comforts of home, but clearly one belonging to somebody else. The comfortable inn at Bree offers Hobbity bed and food and beer, but accompanied now by strange men and possibly half-Orcs, and increasingly obvious risks. Finally at Rivendell, having survived desperate danger, the "Last Homely House", now nothing like a Hobbit-hole, offers safety – for a time, and healing, in the house of a powerful figure, Elrond. Risden comments that "Friends, like enemies, come in many shapes and sizes", and the world contains a "charming and marvelous array of folk", concluding that "The varied [fractal] repetition expands the potentials of the world of Middle-earth"."

==== Gothic ====
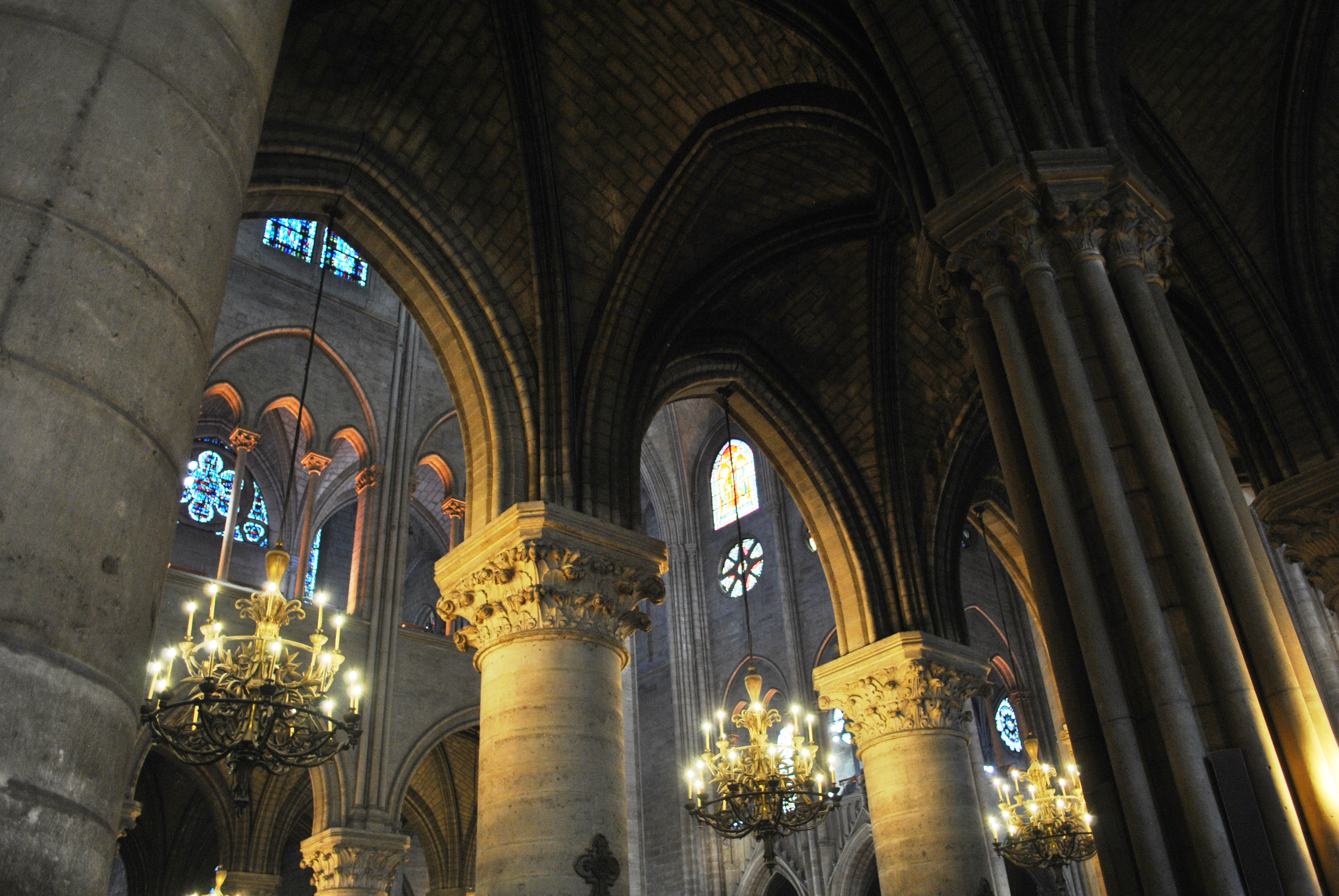
The novel has been likened to a Gothic cathedral, an architectural space that offers multiple vistas, lights, and atmospheres.

As Gothic, according to Risden, the narrative "explores, cathedral-like, pacing, chiaroscuro, and artifice that expands and completes the world of the text." He notes that Gothic art has been described as relating "transcendental ideas and the finite world", in his view just like Middle-earth; and that Gothic sculpture, in the words of the French art historian Henri Focillon, "was the expression of piety" while also "cherish[ing] humanity; it loved and respected God's creatures as He loved them". He likens several story elements to parts of a cathedral, for instance, for Frodo's quest-journey:

E. L. Risden's Gothic cathedral "metaphor"
Story element	Cathedral component
Frodo's path to Mordor	Aisle
Mordor	Altar, place of sacrifice
"Homely Houses"	Side chapels for prayer and spiritual rest
Suffering	Stations of the Cross
Way into Mordor	Ambulatory, a covered passage
Achieving the quest	Eucharist
Rescued by an Eagle	The spirit, John the Evangelist

In Risden's view, Tolkien's use of classical and medieval literary structures, such as asides and descriptive episodes, "allow for the expansion of character and for the exploration of alternative sources of power and goodness in the world", providing a "sense of the romance of a world at the edge of our imagination but out of tangible reach".

=== Symmetry ===
Shippey writes that "one of the most undeniable ..., if least imitated qualities of ... The Lord of the Rings is the complex neatness of its overall design." He gives as an example the detailed parallels between the Fellowship's encounters with Théoden and with Denethor. The Tolkien scholar Jane Chance notes that the two leader's names are almost anagrams.

Tom Shippey's analysis of symmetry in the tales of Théoden and Denethor
Story element	Théoden, King of Rohan	Denethor, Steward of Gondor
Subgroup meets a helpful stranger	Aragorn, Gimli and Legolas meet Éomer	Frodo and Sam meet Faramir
Subgroup leader confronts the stranger	Aragorn defies Éomer	Frodo hides his quest from Faramir
Stranger decides to help the group, against their superior's wishes	Éomer lends horses	Faramir lets Frodo and Sam go
Leader is an old man who has lost a son	Théodred died in battle	Boromir died saving the Hobbits
Leader sees other heir as "doubtful replacement"	Nephew Éomer is disobedient	Faramir is scholarly, not warlike
Leader dies at time of Battle of the Pelennor Fields	Théoden dies in battle	Denethor commits suicide during battle
Leader's hall is described in detail	Meduseld, the "golden hall"	The stone hall in Minas Tirith
A Hobbit swears allegiance to leader	Merry joins the Riders of Rohan	Pippin becomes a palace guard of Gondor

== The Fellowship of the Ring ==
The first volume of The Lord of the Rings, The Fellowship of the Ring, contains three types of narrative structure, not found in the rest of the novel, that have attracted the notice of Tolkien scholars and critics. Firstly, the Hobbit protagonists, having set out on their adventures, repeatedly return to "Homely Houses", comfortable and safe places where they recuperate. Secondly, Frodo many times confers and eats with an advisor (not necessarily in a "Homely House"), then makes a clumsy journey in the face of a danger, then encounters unexpected help. Thirdly, the volume switches between action, with Frodo as protagonist, into two exceptionally long chapters of flashback narrative, both critically important for the novel as a whole.

=== Frodo's five "Homely Houses" ===
Tolkien's descriptions of Frodo's five "Homely Houses", alternating with places of danger, form a repetitive structure for the first part of The Fellowship of the Ring. "Homely Houses" are shown with house icons; dangers, with or without actual violence, with crossed-swords icons. Arrangement is diagrammatic.

==== Deliberately constructed ====
In 2001, in the London Review of Books, Jenny Turner wrote that The Lord of the Rings was suitable for "vulnerable people. You can feel secure inside [it], no matter what is going on in the nasty world outside. The merest weakling can be the master of this cosy little universe. Even a silly furry little hobbit can see his dreams come true." She cited the Tolkien scholar Tom Shippey's observation ("The hobbits ... have to be dug out ... of no fewer than five 'Homely Houses'") that the quest repeats itself, the chase in the Shire ending with dinner at Farmer Maggot's, the trouble with Old Man Willow ending with hot baths and comfort at Tom Bombadil's, and again safety after adventures in Bree, Rivendell, and – though not in a house – Lothlórien. Turner commented that reading the book is to "find oneself gently rocked between bleakness and luxury, the sublime and the cosy. Scary, safe again. Scary, safe again. Scary, safe again."

The start of The Lord of the Rings arranged according to Jenny Turner's 2001 analysis
Cycle	"Scary"	"Safe again" (in Frodo's Five "Homely Houses")
1	—————	1.1 Bag End
2	1.3 Black Riders in pursuit in the Shire	1.5 The little house at Crickhollow
3	1.6 Old Man Willow and the Old Forest	1.7 The house of Tom Bombadil
4	1.8 Barrow-wight	1.9 The Prancing Pony inn at Bree
5	1.11 Black Riders on Weathertop; 1.12 Black Riders in Flight to the Ford	2.2 Rivendell, "the last Homely House east of the sea"

==== "Groping for a story" ====
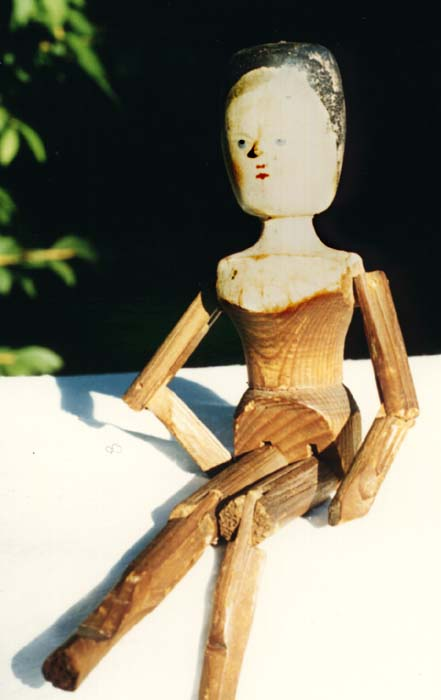
Tom Bombadil was a Dutch doll (example pictured) in Tolkien's family. From there, Tolkien wrote a poem, and from that he created the character in the novel.

Shippey had noticed the alternation at the start of The Lord of the Rings between moments of dangerous adventure and of recuperation. Rather than suggesting that Tolkien had constructed this pattern deliberately, he proposed four explanations of how Tolkien might naturally have created this sort of material. Shippey suggested firstly that the text gives the impression not of a moment of inspiration followed by a period of careful invention, but of a lengthy period of laborious invention, in search of some kind of inspiration. Tolkien would write and invent characters, places, and events. He would then naturally run into the complications that inevitably arise when different story-elements collide. These then led at last to an inspiration.

Shippey comments that the work gave the impression, despite "much reworking", that Tolkien had been "initially groping for a story and keeping himself going with a sort of travelogue". In search of material, Tolkien indulged in "a sort of self-plagiarism", repurposing and expanding his own earlier inventions from, for instance, the poem "The Adventures of Tom Bombadil" which he had written in 1934. This gave him the characters Tom Bombadil, Old Man Willow, and the Barrow-wight. Tolkien's professional knowledge of philology, too, came to his aid, with careful concern for places and placenames, starting in the rather English Shire and then moving outside it. Finally, Tolkien allowed himself a measure of whimsical fun, describing the delicious meals the Hobbit protagonists were able to enjoy when each adventure was over, singing cheerful songs in the form of poems embedded in the text, taking hot baths in Crickhollow, and most pleasurably, constructing humorous dialogue. Shippey comments that "Tolkien found it too easy, and too amusing, just to let the Hobbits chatter on." His friends had to tell him to cut back the Hobbit-talk.

Explanations of Frodo's five "Homely Houses"
Critic	Proposed explanation	Implied writing method
Jenny Turner	Deliberate storytelling for "vulnerable people"	"Scary, safe again. Scary, safe again."
Tom Shippey	Laborious inventions in search of inspiration	Invent characters, places, events. Run into complications: find inspiration at last.
Tom Shippey	Use any materials you wrote earlier	Expand old poems, develop characters mentioned in them (Old Man Willow, Tom Bombadil, the Barrow-wight).
Tom Shippey	Concern for places and placenames	Develop placenames in the Shire and then elsewhere (e.g. Bree) using philology.
Tom Shippey	Whimsical fun	Describe meals in detail; have the characters sing songs, included in the text; let the hobbits "chatter on" and play exuberantly.

=== Cycles and spirals ===
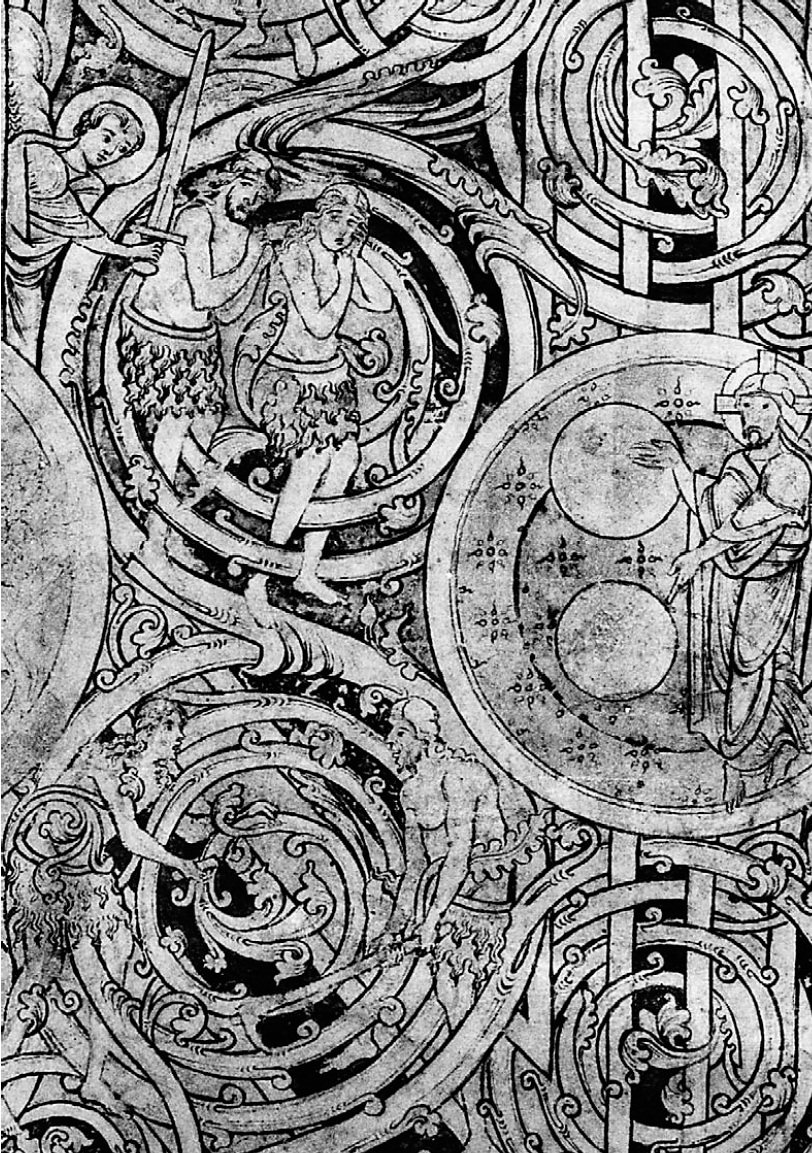
David M. Miller's analysis evokes "cycles and spirals" of story (medieval Meuse School Bible illustrated), with many parallels between different sequences of events.

In A Tolkien Compass, the scholar of literature David M. Miller describes both The Hobbit and The Lord of the Rings as "there and back again" tales "with various digressive adventures upon the way". In his view, the setting is thus the road, and the novel is to an extent picaresque, with the crucial distinction that the components are nearly always essential to the plot. The protagonist, Bilbo and then Frodo, experiences one adventure after another, "perhaps learning and maturing as he goes, but encountering each experience essentially afresh." Miller identifies nine such "cycles" in The Fellowship of the Ring:

David M. Miller's "cycles" in The Fellowship of the Ring
"Conference in tranquillity"	"Blundering journey"	"Danger"	"Unexpected aid"
Gandalf, Frodo	Woody End	Black Rider	Gildor's Elves
Elves, Frodo	Stock Brook	Black Rider	Farmer Maggot
Farmer Maggot, Frodo	Ferry "(no blunder)"	Black Rider?	Hobbits
Frodo, Hobbits	Old Forest	Old Man Willow	Bombadil
Bombadil, Frodo	Barrow-downs	Barrow-wight	Bombadil "(expected)"
Bombadil, Frodo	Party in Prancing Pony	Black Riders	Strider
Strider, Frodo	Weathertop	Black Riders	"Frodo himself", Strider as healer
Strider, Frodo	Last Bridge	Black Riders	Glorfindel
Glorfindel, Strider	Ford of Bruinen	Black Riders	Gandalf, Elrond, River Bruinen

Miller makes several comments on these cycles. Each "conference" involves food, so the cycles are of feast and famine. Each danger "is total", since defeat at any point would end the quest. The unexpected helper in each cycle is the advisor in the next cycle. Miller notes that the cycles involving Old Man Willow and the Barrow-wight are anomalous, as the stages do not get the Ring any closer to Rivendell, nor are the hostile characters at all concerned with the Ring. Instead, the "Old Forest, Old Man Willow, Tom as Eldest" (his emphasis) stand outside time, "left over from the First Age"; and like the quest, "time spurts and lags with discernible rhythm": time seems to stop in the Elvish dwelling-places of Rivendell and Lothlórien. As for the episode with the Barrow-wight, he is in the Second Age, and Frodo enters Men's defeat at the hands of the Witch-king's forces from Carn Dûm. Miller draws parallels between this encounter, where Frodo cuts off the Barrow-wight's hand, and Merry's with the Witch-king at the Battle of the Pelennor Fields; between his call to Bombadil and his own call to Elbereth from Shelob's lair; and between the destruction of the barrow with the wight's banishment, and the final destruction of Barad-Dûr accompanied by the wind's blowing away of Sauron. Miller concludes that "The events of Book I form, not so much a cycle as a spiral. The stakes are constantly increased and the gamblers become increasingly self-aware."

Shippey describes Miller's analysis as giving "a sense of cycles and spirals" rather than a feeling of linear progression. Shippey suggests that these structures might have been "created in part by Tolkien's work habits, rewriting continually", in many small stages like waves of an incoming tide, "each one rolling a little further up the beach."

=== Flashback chapters ===
Scholars including Verlyn Flieger have remarked the narrative structure of the two books of The Fellowship of the Ring, observing that unlike the rest of The Lord of the Rings (which has an elaborately interlaced narrative structure), all of it is told as a single thread with Frodo as the protagonist, with the exception of the two flashback narrative chapters, "The Shadow of the Past" and "The Council of Elrond". Those two chapters, each the second in its respective book, combine summaries of the history of the Ring with quoted dialogue. Further, they are similar in having a wise old character – the Wizard Gandalf or the Elf-leader Elrond – recapitulate the past so as to explain the present situation. Both chapters are exceptionally long; both are critical in setting the direction of the entire novel; and both are unusual in consisting essentially entirely of dialogue, with no action. The structure is unconventional, even daring, as it violates the basic "show, don't tell" precept for good writing.

Narrative structure of The Fellowship of the Ring
Book	Single narrative thread with Frodo as protagonist	Flashback narrated by Gandalf or Elrond	Importance
The Ring Sets Out	"A Long-expected Party"		
The Ring Sets Out		"The Shadow of the Past"	"the crucial chapter" (Tolkien); "the vital chapter" (Shippey); defines the work's central plot; Frodo and the reader realise there will be a quest to destroy the Ring
The Ring Sets Out	10 more chapters		
The Ring Goes South	"Many Meetings"		
The Ring Goes South		"The Council of Elrond"	Exceptionally long at 15,000 words; explains danger of the Ring; introduces the Fellowship members; defines the quest (rest of novel)
The Ring Goes South	8 more chapters		

== Sources ==
- Birns, Nicholas (2012). "'You Have Grown Very Much': The Scouring of the Shire and the Novelistic Aspects of The Lord of the Rings". Journal of the Fantastic in the Arts. 23 (1): 82–101. JSTOR 24353144.
- Chance, Jane (1980) [1979]. Tolkien's Art: 'A Mythology for England'. Papermac. ISBN 0-333-29034-8.
- Curry, Patrick (2020) [2014]. "The Critical Response to Tolkien's Fiction". In Lee, Stuart D. (ed.). A Companion to J. R. R. Tolkien (PDF). Wiley Blackwell. ISBN 978-1-11965-602-9.
- Drout, Michael D. C. (2004). "Tolkien's Prose Style and its Literary and Rhetorical Effects". Tolkien Studies. 1 (1): 137–163. doi:10.1353/tks.2004.0006. S2CID 170271511.
- Flieger, Verlyn (2001) [1997]. A Question of Time: J.R.R. Tolkien's Road to Faërie. Kent State University Press. ISBN 978-0-87338-699-9.
- Hirsch, Bernhard (2014). "After the "end of all things": The Long Return Home to the Shire". Tolkien Studies. 11 (11): 77–107. doi:10.1353/tks.2014.0015. S2CID 170501504 – via Project Muse.
- Miller, David M. (1975). "Narrative Pattern in The Fellowship of the Ring". In Lobdell, Jared (ed.). A Tolkien Compass (First ed.). Open Court. pp. 95–106. ISBN 0-87548-303-8.
- Risden, E. L. (2011). "Tolkien's Resistance to Linearity: Narrating The Lord of the Rings in Fiction and Film". In Bogstad, Janice M.; Kaveny, Philip E. (eds.). Picturing Tolkien: Essays on Peter Jackson's 'The Lord of the Rings' Film Trilogy. McFarland. pp. 70–83. ISBN 978-0-7864-8473-7.
- Rosebury, Brian (2003) [1992]. Tolkien : A Cultural Phenomenon. Palgrave. ISBN 978-1403-91263-3.
- Shippey, Tom (2001). J. R. R. Tolkien: Author of the Century. HarperCollins. ISBN 978-0261-10401-3.
- Shippey, Tom (2005) [1982]. The Road to Middle-Earth: How J. R. R. Tolkien Created a New Mythology (Third ed.). HarperCollins. ISBN 978-0-261-10275-0.
- Tolkien, J. R. R. (1954a). The Fellowship of the Ring. The Lord of the Rings. Boston: Houghton Mifflin. OCLC 9552942.
- West, Richard C. (1975). "The Interlace Structure of The Lord of the Rings". In Jared Lobdell (ed.). A Tolkien Compass. Open Court. pp. 77–94. ISBN 0-87548-303-8.
