= Quests in Middle-earth =

Theme in Tolkien's fiction

J. R. R. Tolkien's best-known novels, The Hobbit and The Lord of the Rings, both have the structure of quests, with a hero setting out, facing dangers, achieving a goal, and returning home. Where The Hobbit is a children's story with the simple goal of treasure, The Lord of the Rings is a more complex narrative with multiple quests. Its main quest, to destroy the One Ring, has been described as a reversed quest – starting with a much-desired treasure, and getting rid of it. That quest, too, is balanced against a moral quest, to scour the Shire and return it to its original state.

Tolkien superimposed multiple meanings on the basic quest, for example embedding a hidden Christian message in the story, and marking the protagonists Frodo and Aragorn out as heroes by giving them magic swords in the epic tradition of Sigurd and Arthur.

== Context ==
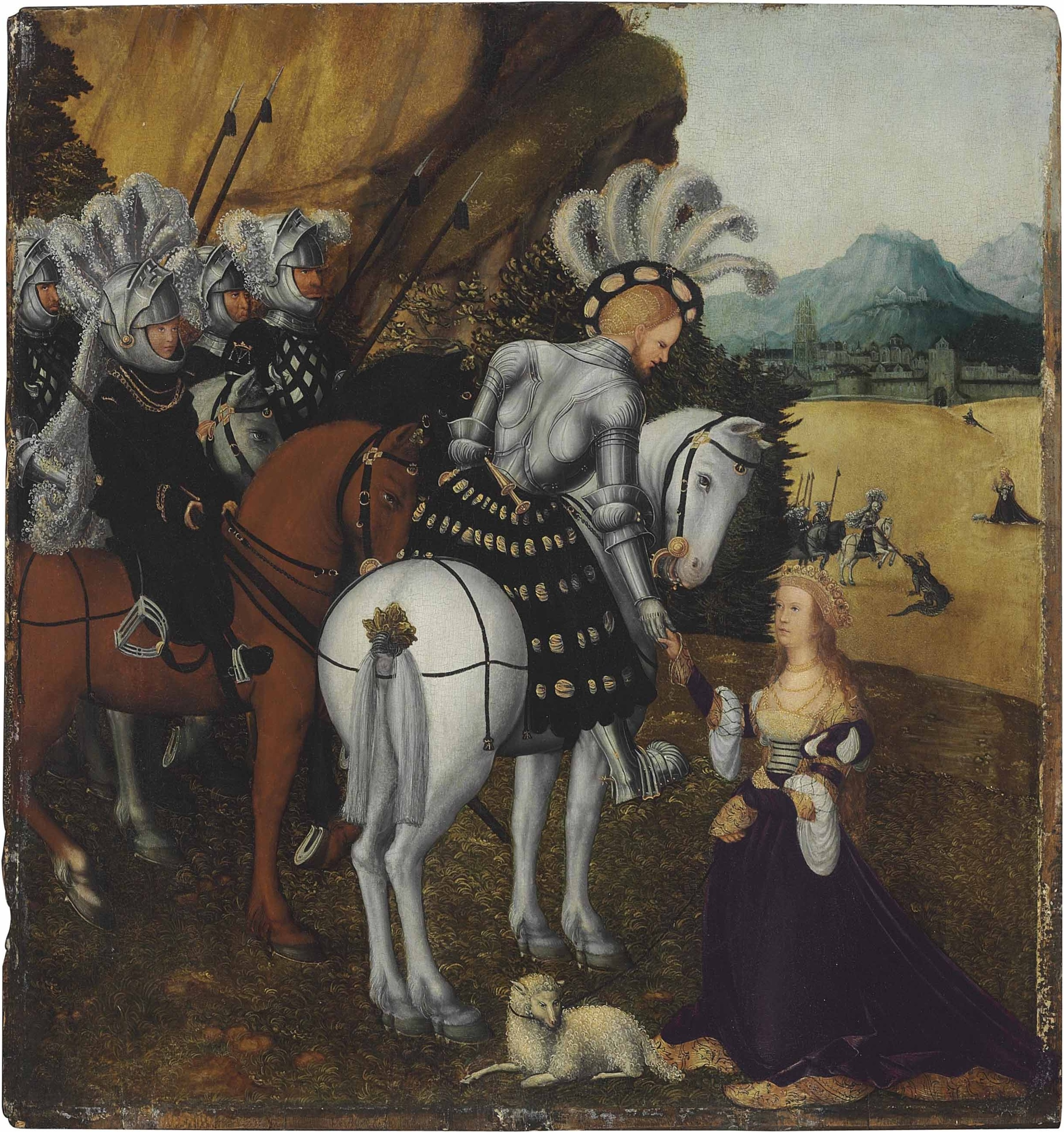
Allegorical portrait of a knight reaching his princess at the end of his quest. In the background, he kills a dragon. Workshop of Lucas Cranach the Elder, c. 1515–20

J. R. R. Tolkien (1892–1973) was an English Roman Catholic writer, poet, philologist, and academic, best known as the author of the high fantasy works The Hobbit and The Lord of the Rings, both set in Middle-earth.

A quest is a difficult journey with a specific goal. It serves as a plot device in mythology and fiction, and is often symbolic or allegorical. The quest, in the form of the hero's journey, plays a central role in what Joseph Campbell called the monomyth: the hero sets forth from the world of common day into a land of adventures, tests, and magical rewards. In a conventional heroic romance quest, the knight-errant in shining armour overcomes obstacles to win the heart of a beautiful princess.

== Quest novels ==
The Hobbit and its sequel The Lord of the Rings can both, the scholar of literature Paul Kocher writes, be viewed as quest narratives, with parallel structures: the stories begin at Bag End, the home of Bilbo Baggins; Bilbo hosts a party; the Wizard Gandalf sends the protagonist on a quest eastward; the wise Half-Elf Elrond offers a haven and advice; the adventurers escape dangerous creatures underground (Goblin Town/Moria); they meet another group of Elves (Mirkwood/Lothlórien); they traverse a desolate region (Desolation of Smaug/the Dead Marshes); they are received by a small settlement of men (Esgaroth/Ithilien); they fight in a massive battle (The Battle of Five Armies/Battle of Pelennor Fields); their journey climaxes within an infamous mountain peak (Lonely Mountain/Mount Doom); a descendant of kings is restored to his ancestral throne (Bard/Aragorn); and the questing party returns home to find it in a deteriorated condition (having possessions auctioned off/the Scouring of the Shire).

Paul Kocher's analysis of quest structure in The Hobbit and The Lord of the Rings
Event	The Hobbit	The Lord of the Rings
Start	From Bag End, the home of Bilbo Baggins	
Sendoff	Bilbo hosts a party	
Mentor	The Wizard Gandalf sends the protagonist on eastwards quest	
Helper	The wise Half-elf Elrond offers a haven and advice	
Underground perils	Escape from Goblin Town	Escape from Orcs, Trolls, Balrog in Moria
Elves	Meet Elves of Mirkwood	Meet Elves of Lothlórien
Desolate region	Cross the desolation of Smaug	Cross the Dead Marshes
Helpers	Received by Men of Esgaroth	Received by Faramir's men in Ithilien
Climactic battle	The Battle of Five Armies	The Battle of the Pelennor Fields
Mountain goal	Lonely Mountain	Mount Doom
Restoration of King	Bard returns to ancestral throne in Esgaroth	Aragorn returns to ancestral throne in Gondor
Returning home	Bilbo's possessions are being auctioned off	Shire has been despoiled, requires scouring

Randel Helms, a scholar of literature including Tolkien, comments that the two novels have the same story and the same theme, "a quest on which a most unheroic hobbit achieves heroic stature". Further, Helms writes, both have the "there and back again" quest romance format, and both quests have a timescale of one year (spring to spring, and autumn to autumn, respectively). He comments that while the two novels are thus structurally similar, "the natures of the two quests and the reasons for beginning them are strikingly different," Bilbo's being "at first little more than a lark with venal motives" whereas Frodo's quest "goes with the pain of a sad but noble decision".

Randel Helms's analysis of quest structure in The Hobbit and The Lord of the Rings
Event	The Hobbit	The Lord of the Rings
Start	From Bag End in the Shire	
End of 1st phase	Trip down River Running, nearing Erebor	Trip down River Anduin, nearing Mordor
Approaching the goal	Cross the dragon's withered heath	Cross the evil polluted plain of Gorgoroth
Achieving the quest	Enter hole in side of the Lonely Mountain	Enter hole in side of Mount Doom
Success marked by	Arrival of Great Eagles	
Returning home	Have to stop auction of Bag End	Have to scour the Shire of Sharkey's evil

The Silmarillion is not a quest novel, but it contains quests of its own. Lúthien and Beren, royal Elf and Man, are sent on a quest by Lúthien's father Thingol who is opposed to her marrying a mortal Man. He sets a seemingly impossible task as the bride price: Beren has to bring him one of the Silmarils from the Dark Lord Morgoth's Iron Crown.

== Balanced structures ==
=== Quest balanced against series of tableaux ===
The scholar of humanities Brian Rosebury writes that The Lord of the Rings combines a slow, descriptive series of scenes or tableaux illustrating Middle-earth with a unifying plotline in the shape of the quest to destroy the One Ring. The Ring needs to be destroyed to save Middle-earth itself from destruction or domination by Sauron. The work builds up Middle-earth as a place that readers come to love, shows that it is under dire threat, and – with the destruction of the Ring – provides the "eucatastrophe" for a happy ending. The work is thus, Rosebury asserts, very tightly constructed, the expansive descriptions and the Ring-based plot fitting together exactly.

Diagram of Brian Rosebury's analysis of The Lord of the Rings, as a combined Quest (to destroy the Ring) and Journey (as a series of Tableaux of places in Middle-earth); the two support each other, and interlock tightly to do so.

=== Quests of the Ring and the Shire ===
Tolkien scholars and critics have noted that the penultimate chapter of The Lord of the Rings, "The Scouring of the Shire", with its separate quest to save the Shire, implies some kind of formal structure for the whole work. The critic Bernhard Hirsch accepts Tolkien's statement in the foreword to the Fellowship of the Ring that the formal structure of The Lord of the Rings, namely a journey outward for the main quest and a journey home for the Shire quest, was "foreseen from the outset". Another critic, Nicholas Birns, notes approvingly David Waito's argument that the chapter is as important morally as the Fellowship's main quest to destroy the One Ring, "but applies [the morals] to daily life". Birns argues that the chapter has an important formal role in the overall composition of The Lord of the Rings, as Tolkien had stated. Kocher writes that Frodo, having thrown aside his weapons and armour on Mount Doom, chooses to fight "only on the moral plane" in the Shire.

Formal structure of The Lord of the Rings: narrative arcs balancing the main text on the quest to destroy the One Ring in Mordor with Frodo's moral quest in "The Scouring of the Shire"

== Reversed quests ==
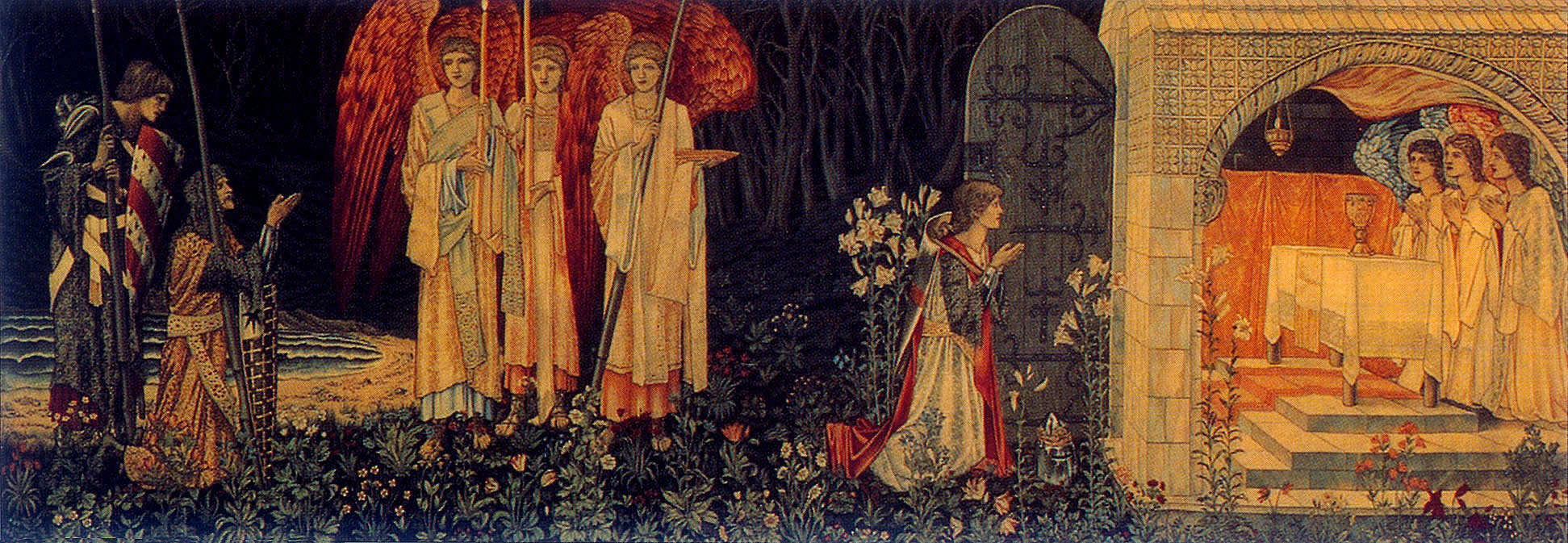
Unlike a typical quest like seeking the Holy Grail of Arthurian legend, Frodo's is to destroy an object, the One Ring. Vision of the Holy Grail by William Morris, 1890

The Tolkien scholar Richard C. West writes that the story of The Lord of the Rings is basically simple: the hobbit Frodo Baggins's quest is to take the Dark Lord Sauron's Ring to Mount Doom and destroy it. He calls the quest "primary", along with the war against Sauron. The critic David M. Miller agrees that the quest is the "most important narrative device" in the book, but adds that it is reversed from the conventional structure: the hero is not seeking a treasure, but is hoping to destroy one. He notes that from Sauron's point of view, the tale is indeed a quest, and his evil Black Riders replace the traditional "errant knights seeking the holy of holies", while the Fellowship keeping the Ring from him cannot use it: thus there are multiple reversals. Other authors such as Jared Lobdell and Lori M. Campbell agree that it is a "reverse quest" or "inverted quest"; Campbell wrote that "the mission is to destroy rather than to find something, what [Michael N.] Stanton calls an 'inverted quest' in which 'Evil struggles to gain power; Good to relinquish it'". The Tolkien critic Tom Shippey concurs that it is "an anti-quest", a story of renunciation. He writes that Tolkien had lived through two world wars, the "routine bombardment" of civilians, the use of famine for political gain, concentration camps and genocide, and the development and use of chemical and nuclear weapons. Shippey states that the book raises the question of whether, if the ability of humans to produce that kind of evil could somehow be destroyed, even at the cost of sacrificing something, this would be worth doing.

Richard M. Miller's analysis of reversed quests in The Lord of the Rings
Character	Quest	Outcome
Traditional Knight-errant	Obtain the Holy Grail	Success, spiritual purity
Frodo Baggins	Destroy the One Ring	Ring is destroyed, but not by Frodo; Frodo returns broken
Sauron and his nine Black Riders	Obtain the One Ring	Failure, they are destroyed, along with the Ring

Mason Harris, in Mythlore, contrasts Frodo's "renunciatory" quest with Bilbo's. In his view, The Hobbit represents Tolkien's ideal journey as Bilbo's "curiosity overcomes his Hobbitish fear of the unknown, while Frodo wishes that he had never seen the Ring, but also, because of the Ring's influence, would like to keep it, and thus both dreads his journey and is reluctant to fulfill its object."

== Multiple meanings ==
Shippey remarks that The Lord of the Rings contains meanings of different kinds beneath the immediate quest story. Thus, Tolkien, a Christian, makes the newly-assembled Fellowship set out on its quest from Rivendell on 25 December, the date of Christmas. He similarly has the Fellowship destroy the Ring and cause the fall of the enemy, Sauron, on 25 March, the date in Anglo-Saxon tradition for the Crucifixion. Tolkien thus embedded a subtle reference to the life of Christ in the narrative, one that Shippey notes almost no readers actually observe.

The Tolkien scholar Verlyn Flieger writes that both Frodo and Aragorn receive their renewed magic swords in Rivendell, marking them out as heroes in the epic tradition of Sigurd and Arthur, at the start of their quest.

== Sources ==
- Auden, W. H. (2004). "The Quest Hero". In Rose A. Zimbardo; Neil D. Isaacs (eds.). Understanding the Lord of the Rings: The Best of Tolkien Criticism. Houghton Mifflin. pp. 31–51. ISBN 978-0-618-42251-7.
- Birns, Nicholas (2012). "'You Have Grown Very Much': The Scouring of the Shire and the Novelistic Aspects of The Lord of the Rings". Journal of the Fantastic in the Arts. 23 (1): 82–101. JSTOR 24353144.
- Campbell, Joseph (1949). The Hero with a Thousand Faces (1st ed.). Princeton University Press. ISBN 978-0-6910-9743-5.
- Campbell, Lori M. (2010). Portals of Power: Magical Agency and Transformation in Literary Fantasy. McFarland. p. 161. ISBN 978-0-7864-5655-0.
- Carpenter, Humphrey (1978) [1977]. J. R. R. Tolkien: A Biography. Unwin Paperbacks. ISBN 978-0-04928-039-7.
- Flieger, Verlyn (2004). "Frodo and Aragorn: The Concept of the Hero". In Rose A. Zimbardo and Neil D. Isaacs (ed.). Understanding the Lord of the Rings: The Best of Tolkien Criticism. Houghton Mifflin. pp. 122–145. ISBN 978-0-618-42251-7.
- Harris, Mason (1988). "The Psychology of Power in Tolkien's 'The Lord of the Rings', Orwell's '1984' and Le Guin's 'A Wizard of Earthsea'". Mythlore. 15 (1). Article 8.
- Helms, Randel (1974). Tolkien's World. Boston: Houghton Mifflin. ISBN 0-395-18490-8.
- Hirsch, Bernhard (2014). "After the 'end of all things': The Long Return Home to the Shire". Tolkien Studies. 11 (11): 77–107. doi:10.1353/tks.2014.0015. S2CID 170501504.
- Kocher, Paul (1974). Master of Middle-earth, the Achievement of J. R. R. Tolkien. Penguin Books.
- Lobdell, Jared (1981). England and Always: Tolkien's World of the Rings. William B. Eerdmans Publishing Company. p. x. ISBN 978-0-8028-1898-0.
- Miller, David M. (1975). "Narrative Pattern in 'The Fellowship of the Ring'". In Lobdell, Jared (ed.). A Tolkien Compass. Open Court. ISBN 978-0-8754-8303-0.
- Moore, Clare (2022). "Goddess and Mortal: The Celtic and the French Morgan le Fay in Tolkien's Silmarillion". Mythlore. 41 (1). Article 12.
- Rosebury, Brian (2003) [1992]. Tolkien: A Cultural Phenomenon. Palgrave. doi:10.1057/9780230599987. ISBN 978-1403-91263-3.
- Segal, Robert; Raglan, Fitzroy R. S.; Rank, Otto (1990). In Quest of the Hero. Princeton University Press. ISBN 978-0-691-02062-4.
- Shippey, Tom (2005) [1982]. The Road to Middle-Earth: How J. R. R. Tolkien Created a New Mythology (Third ed.). HarperCollins. ISBN 978-0-261-10275-0.
- Stanton, Michael N. (2015). Hobbits, Elves and Wizards: The Wonders and Worlds of JRR Tolkien's 'Lord of the Rings'. Palgrave. ISBN 978-0-312-23826-1.
- Tolkien, J. R. R. (1977). Christopher Tolkien (ed.). The Silmarillion. Boston: Houghton Mifflin. ISBN 978-0-395-25730-2.
- Waito, David M. (2010). "The Shire Quest: The 'Scouring of the Shire' as the Narrative and Thematic Focus of The Lord of the Rings". Mythlore. 28 (3–4): 155–177.
- West, Richard C. (1975). "The Interlace Structure of 'The Lord of the Rings'". In Lobdell, Jared (ed.). A Tolkien Compass. Open Court. ISBN 978-0-8754-8303-0.
