= The Scouring of the Shire =

Book chapter

"The Scouring of the Shire" is the penultimate chapter of J. R. R. Tolkien's fantasy The Lord of the Rings. The Fellowship hobbits, Frodo, Sam, Merry, and Pippin, return home to the Shire to find that it is under the brutal control of ruffians and their leader "Sharkey", who turns out to be the Wizard Saruman. The ruffians have despoiled the Shire, cutting down trees and destroying old houses, as well as replacing the old mill with a larger one full of machinery which pollutes the air and the water. The hobbits rouse the Shire to rebellion, lead their fellow hobbits to victory in the Battle of Bywater, and end Saruman's rule.

Critics have considered "The Scouring of the Shire" one of the most important chapters in The Lord of the Rings. Although Tolkien denied that the chapter was an allegory for Britain in the aftermath of World War II, different commentators have argued that it can be applied to that period, with contemporary political references that variously include a satire of socialism, echoes of Nazism, allusions to the shortages in postwar Britain, and a strand of environmentalism.

According to Tolkien, the idea of such a chapter was planned from the outset as part of the overall formal structure of The Lord of the Rings, though its details were not worked out until much later. The chapter was intended to counterbalance the larger plot, concerning the physical journey to destroy the One Ring, with a moral quest upon the return home, to purify the Shire and to take personal responsibility. Tolkien considered other identities for the wicked Sharkey before settling on Saruman late in his composition process.

The chapter, which has been called one of the most famous anticlimaxes in literature, has generally been excluded from film adaptations of The Lord of the Rings. Peter Jackson's film trilogy omits the chapter, but maintains two key elements: a burning Shire, glimpsed by Frodo in the crystal ball-like Mirror of Galadriel; and the means of Saruman's death, transposed to Isengard.

== Fictional history ==
=== Context ===
The chapter follows all the main action of The Lord of the Rings. The story tells how the One Ring, a ring of power made by the Dark Lord Sauron, lost for many centuries, has reappeared and is in the hands of a hobbit, Frodo Baggins, in the England-like Shire. If Sauron finds the Ring, he will use it to take over the whole of Middle-earth. A Wizard, Gandalf, tells Frodo the history of the ring and persuades him to leave the Shire to destroy the Ring. He is joined by three other hobbits, his friends Sam, Merry, and Pippin. They are pursued by Sauron's Black Riders, but escape to a stronghold of the Elves, Rivendell. There, they learn that it can only be destroyed in the volcano, Mount Doom, where Sauron forged the Ring, in the evil land of Mordor. They are joined by others opposed to Sauron, forming a Fellowship of the Ring, led by Gandalf. They face many perils on the journey, and the Fellowship is split up. Merry and Pippin become involved in wars against the evil Wizard Saruman and then against Sauron: Merry becomes a knight of Rohan, while Pippin becomes a guard of Gondor. With Sauron distracted, Frodo and Sam manage to travel to Mount Doom. The Ring is destroyed in the Cracks of Doom, and Sauron is overthrown. The hobbits, much changed by their experiences, ride home to the Shire, hoping to return to a peaceful rural life.

=== The scouring ===
The hobbits of the Fellowship – Frodo, Sam, Merry, and Pippin – returning home to the Shire, come to its border, the Brandywine Bridge, late at night. They are surprised to find it barred, but are taken in, after some convincing, by the Shiriffs, a kind of hobbit police, who are guarding the bridge. They are shocked at the state of the Shire, with endless rules, ugly new buildings, and wanton destruction of trees and old buildings. Sam recognises one of the Shiriffs and tells him he should be ashamed of himself for joining in with "such nonsense". (Note: Tolkien 1955, book 6 ch. 8 "The Scouring of the Shire") All the cheerful inns are closed, so the Fellowship hobbits stay in the depressing, badly-built new Shiriff-house.

Setting off on ponies for Hobbiton at the centre of the Shire the next morning, the four hobbits are met by Shiriffs at the village of Frogmorton who attempt to arrest them for breaking several rules the night before. Unable to keep up with the ponies, the Shiriffs let the hobbits pass.

Reaching the village of Bywater, the four hobbits discover that Sandyman's mill has been replaced by a big, noisy one full of machinery that fouls the water and pollutes the air; Ted Sandyman is the only hobbit who likes it, and he works for the Men who built it, whereas his father was his own boss. Merry, Pippin and Sam use their swords and their height (Note: Pippin and Merry, having partaken of Treebeard's Ent-draught, have grown by inches, and indeed are now the tallest hobbits ever seen in the Shire.) to scare away a group of ruffians. The hobbits decide to 'raise the Shire'; Merry blows the magic horn given to him by Éowyn of Rohan, while Sam recruits his neighbour Tom Cotton and his sons, who rouse the village. Cotton tells them that wagonloads of goods, including tobacco, have been sent "away", causing shortages; they were paid for with unexplained funds by Lotho Sackville-Baggins, known as the "Chief" or the "Boss", who moved into Frodo's home, Bag End, when Frodo left on the quest to destroy the Ring. Pippin rides to his home village, Tuckborough, to rally his kin, the large Took clan. A gang of twenty ruffians from Hobbiton try to take farmer Cotton prisoner; the leader of the gang is killed with arrows, and the other ruffians quickly surrender.

The next morning the hobbits at Bywater learn that Pippin's father, Thain Paladin II, has raised Tookland and is pursuing ruffians who have fled south; that Pippin will return with all the hobbits his father could spare; and that a much larger group of ruffians is heading towards them. Pippin returns with one hundred members of his family, before the ruffians arrive. Merry and Pippin lead the hobbits to victory in the brief Battle of Bywater. They ambush the ruffians by blocking a high-hedged lane with wagons in front of them and then behind them; most of the ruffians are killed. Frodo does not take part in the fighting.

The hobbits go to Hobbiton to visit Lotho. The whole area has been despoiled, and Bag End is apparently empty and unused. There they meet "Sharkey", alias of the Wizard Saruman; he is accompanied by his servant Wormtongue. He has lost his Wizard's power, except for his deceptive voice; he tells them he has deliberately harmed their home in revenge. Frodo tells him to leave the Shire; Saruman in reply tries to stab Frodo, but the knife snaps on Frodo's hidden coat of mithril chain-mail. Frodo asks the other hobbits not to kill Saruman and offers Wormtongue the opportunity to stay. Saruman reveals that Wormtongue killed Lotho, provoking Wormtongue to cut Saruman's throat. Wormtongue is shot dead by hobbit archers. A column of mist arises from Saruman's corpse and is blown away in the wind.

=== Aftermath ===
After the scouring, "the clearing up certainly needed a lot of work, but it took less time than Sam had feared". (Note: Tolkien 1955, book 6, ch. 9 "The Grey Havens") The cleanup is described in the first pages of the final chapter, "The Grey Havens"; the new buildings put up during Sharkey's rule are torn down and their materials reused "to repair many an old [hobbit] hole". Sam goes around the Shire planting saplings to replace lost trees, giving each one a grain of the dust from Galadriel's garden; the single nut he plants in the Party Field. The work is successful: "spring surpassed his wildest hopes", and "altogether 1420 in the Shire was a marvellous year". A mallorn sapling like those of Lothlórien replaces the Party Tree, many children are born with "a rich golden hair", and young hobbits "very nearly bathed in strawberries and cream".

== Concept and creation ==
=== Formal structure ===
Formal structure of The Lord of the Rings: narrative arcs balancing the main text on the quest to destroy the One Ring in Mordor with The Scouring of the Shire

Tolkien scholars and critics have noted that the chapter implies some kind of formal structure for the whole work. The critic Bernhard Hirsch writes that "The Scouring of the Shire" has "provoked considerable critical debate", unlike the rest of the "homeward journey" in Book 6. Hirsch accepts Tolkien's statement in the foreword to the Fellowship of the Ring that the formal structure of The Lord of the Rings, namely a journey outward for the quest and a journey home, meant that the chapter, along with the other two chapters of the return journey, was "foreseen from the outset". Another critic, Nicholas Birns, notes approvingly David Waito's argument that the chapter is as important morally as the Fellowship's main quest to destroy the One Ring, "but applies [the morals] to daily life". The Tolkien scholar Paul Kocher writes that Frodo, having thrown aside his weapons and armour on Mount Doom, chooses to fight "only on the moral plane" in the Shire.

Birns goes further, arguing that the chapter has an important formal role in the overall composition of The Lord of the Rings, as Tolkien had stated. In Birns's view, the chapter's main surprise is the appearance of Saruman, and it was indeed, Birns writes, his presence that made it necessary to scour the Shire. Evidence that Tolkien had planned something of the sort is found, Birns notes, in Sam's vision of the future of the Shire in peril when he looks in the Mirror of Galadriel in Lothlorien in The Fellowship of the Ring.

=== Origins ===
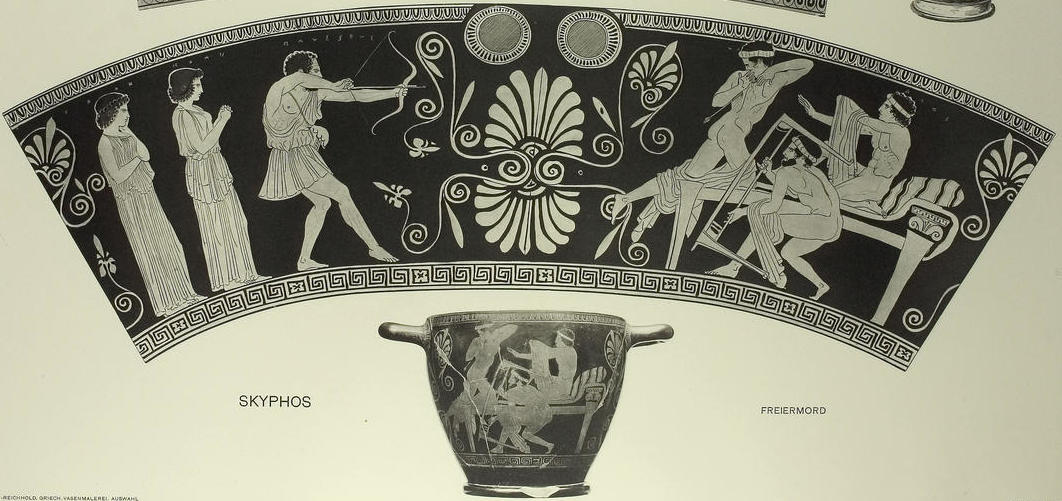
An ancient pedigree: Odysseus, returning home after long years of war, scours his home of the suitors of his wife Penelope, in Homer's tale. Greek skyphos, 440 BC

Scholars have identified several possible origins and antecedents for the chapter, and these have been added to by Christopher Tolkien's exploration of the literary history of his father's work on it over the years. Scholars agree that the "Scouring" has an ancient pedigree, echoing Homer's Odyssey when after long years away Odysseus returns to his home island of Ithaca to scour it of Penelope's worthless suitors. Robert Plank adds that Tolkien could have chosen as a pattern any number of other returning heroes. This theme, of a last obstacle to the heroic homecoming, was paradoxically both long-planned (certainly back to the time of writing of the Lothlorien chapter) and, in the person of Saruman-as-Sharkey, "a very late entry". David Greenman in addition contrasts the scouring with Tuor's Aeneas-like escape from a wrecked kingdom as told in The Fall of Gondolin.

In Sauron Defeated, earlier drafts of the chapter show that Tolkien had considered giving Frodo a far more energetic part in confronting Sharkey and the ruffians. These throw light on Tolkien's choice of who Sharkey actually was, whether the "boss" hobbit Lotho Sackville-Baggins, a human leader of the gang of ruffians, or Saruman. Tolkien had thus hesitated over how to implement the "Scouring", only arriving at Saruman after trying other options. Birns argues that the effect is to bring the "consequentiality of abroad" (including Isengard, where Saruman was strong) back to the "parochialism of home", not only scouring the Shire but also strengthening it, with Merry and Pippin as "world citizens".

In his "Foreword to the Second Edition", Tolkien denies that the chapter is an allegory or relates to events in or after the Second World War:

An author cannot of course remain wholly unaffected by his experience, but the ways in which a story-germ uses the soil of experience are extremely complex, and attempts to define the process are at best guesses from evidence that is inadequate and ambiguous.... it has been supposed by some that 'The Scouring of the Shire' reflects the situation in England at the time [in the 1940s and 1950s] when I was finishing my tale. It does not. It is an essential part of the plot, foreseen from the outset, though in the event modified by the character of Saruman as developed in the story without, need I say, any allegorical significance or contemporary political reference whatsoever. (Note: Tolkien 1966, pp. 11–12 "Foreword to the Second Edition")

The Tolkien critic Tom Shippey writes that the Shire is certainly where Middle-earth comes nearest to the 20th century, and that the people who had commented that the "Scouring of the Shire" was about Tolkien's contemporary England were not wholly wrong. Shippey suggests however that rather than seeing the chapter as an allegory of postwar England, it could be taken as an account of "a society suffering not only from political misrule, but from a strange and generalized crisis of confidence." Shippey draws a parallel with a contemporary work, George Orwell's 1938 novel Coming Up for Air, where England is subjected to a "similar diagnosis" of leaderless inertia.

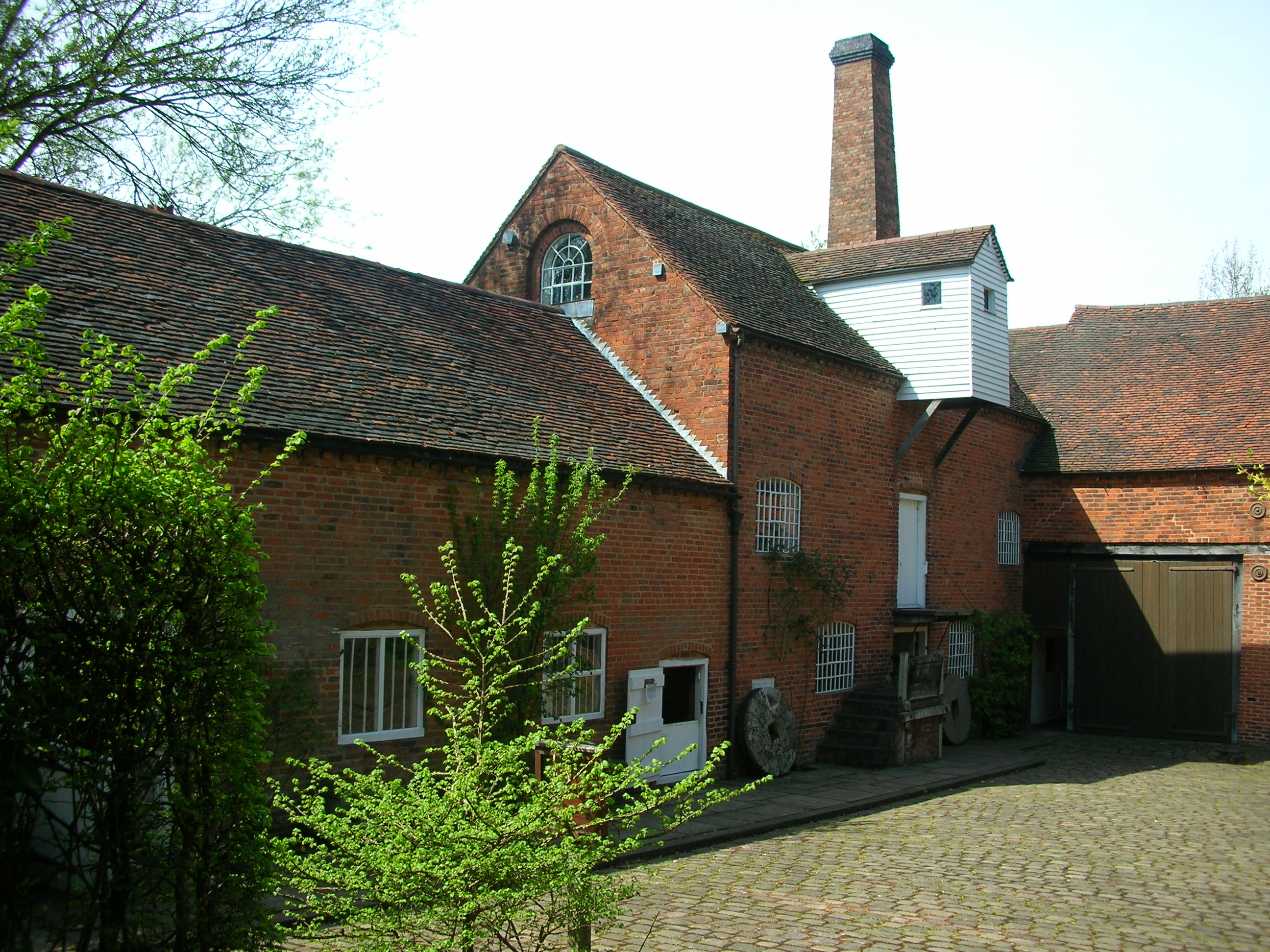
Tolkien related the chapter to his childhood experiences at Sarehole as it was taken over by the industrial growth of Birmingham, and the old mill there fell into disrepair.

Critics including Plank have noted that Tolkien denied that the "Scouring of the Shire" reflected England in the late 1940s, claiming instead that the chapter echoed his youthful experience of seeing his home at Sarehole, then in rural Warwickshire, being taken over by the growing city of Birmingham in the early 1900s. Tolkien related the chapter to his childhood experiences at the end of the 19th century:

It has indeed some basis in experience, though slender (for the economic situation was entirely different), and much further back [than the Second World War]. The country in which I lived in childhood was being shabbily destroyed before I was ten, in days when motor-cars were rare objects (I had never seen one) and men were still building suburban railways. Recently I saw in a paper a picture of the last decrepitude of the once thriving corn-mill [Sarehole Mill] beside its pool that long ago seemed to me so important. I never liked the looks of the Young miller, but his father, the Old miller, had a black beard, and he was not named Sandyman.

Instead of a strict allegory with exact correspondences between the elements of the chapter and 20th century events and personages, Plank suggested that the chapter was "a realistic parable of reality". Birns and others note, too, that there is an echo in the chapter of the soldiers, including Tolkien, returning home from the trenches of the First World War, and meeting an unfair lack of appreciation of their contribution, as when Sam's father, Gaffer Gamgee, is more concerned with the damage to his potatoes than any "trapessing in foreign parts".

== Significance ==
=== Satire on mid-20th century politics ===
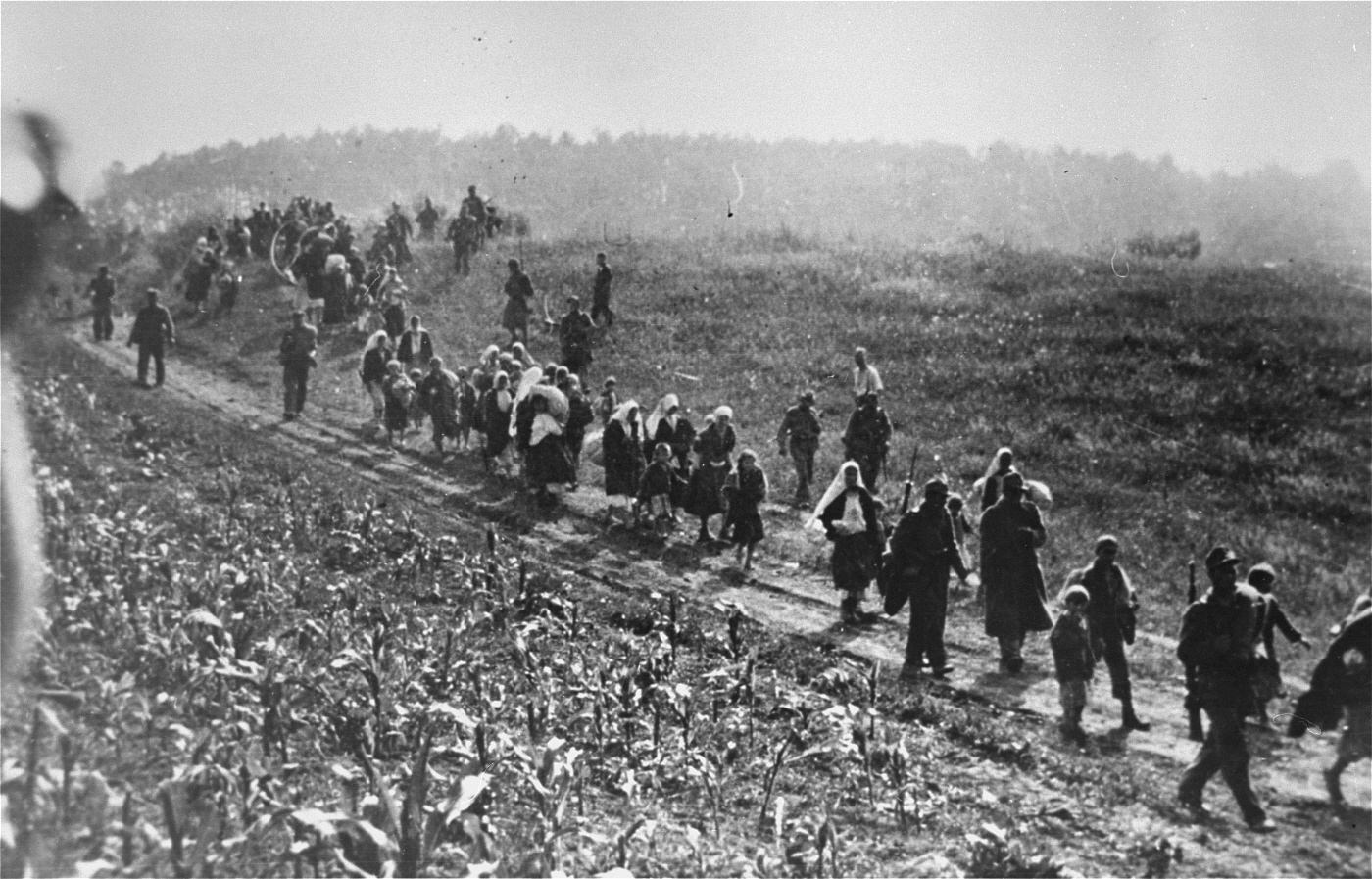
Saruman's use of "Ruffians" to tyrannise the Shire has been compared to the Nazis' handling of dissent, here by marching people off to an internment camp in Serbia.

Various commentators have noted that the chapter has political overtones. The critic Jerome Donnelly suggests that the chapter is a satire, of a more serious kind than the knockabout "comedy of manners" at the start of The Hobbit. Plank calls it a caricature of fascism. Donnelly agrees with Tolkien that the "Scouring" is not an allegory, but proposes that Saruman's "Ruffians" echo the tyrannical behaviour of the Nazis, as do "the use of collaborators, threats, torture and killing of dissenters, and internment".

Jay Richards and Jonathan Witt write that "conservatives and progressives alike" had seen the chapter as a "pointed critique of modern socialism", citing the right-wing author Hal Colebatch's comment that the rule- and redistribution-heavy Saruman regime "owed much to the drabness, bleakness and bureaucratic regulation of postwar Britain under the Attlee Labour Government". They note similarly Plank's identification of "parallels" between the Shire under Saruman and both the German Nazi Party under Hitler and Italian Fascism under Mussolini. Plank discusses, for example, why the hobbits did not resist fascism, giving as reasons cowardice, lack of solidarity, and what he finds "the most interesting and the most melancholy": the shirriff-hobbit's statement "I am sorry, Mr. Merry, but we have orders." Plank comments that this recalls statements from the Nuremberg trials. He further compares Saruman with Mussolini, noting that they both came to "a miserable end". Richards and Witt concede that the chapter has wider themes, including the ugliness of Saruman's "vengeful heart", the nastiness of (sub)urban development, the hobbits' love-inspired defence of their homeland, and the need not to just obey orders, but state that Tolkien's letters demonstrate his dislike of socialism, and that in the chapter Tolkien deftly satirizes "socialism's pose of moral superiority".

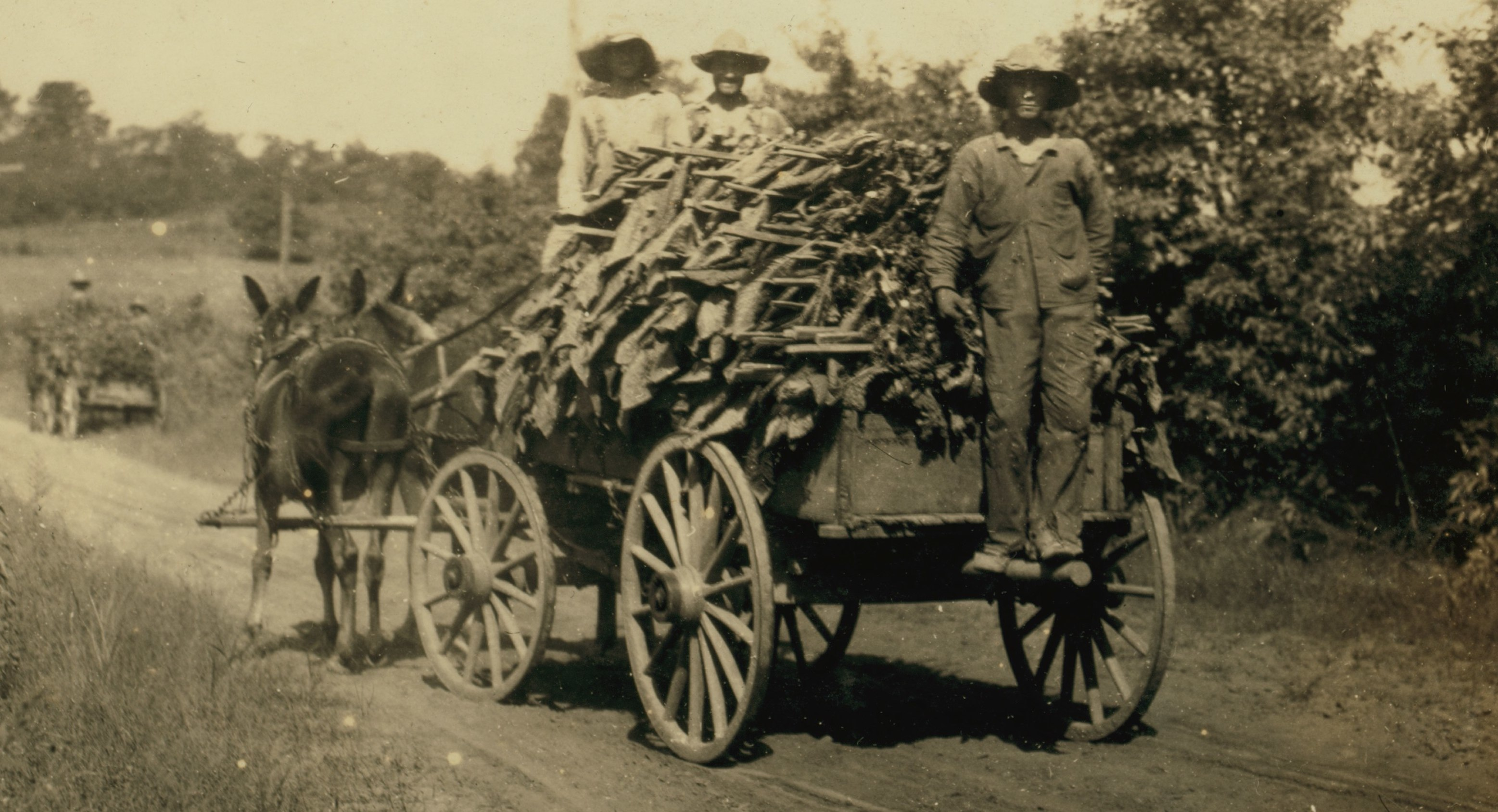
The export of "wagonloads of pipeweed" (here, tobacco, in a 1916 American photograph) from the Shire suggested postwar England's "gone for export" explanation of shortages.

Shippey comments that whatever Tolkien's protestations, readers back in the 1950s would have noticed some features of the Shire during the "Scouring" that "seem[ed] slightly out of place", such as the fact that wagonloads of "pipeweed" (tobacco) are being taken away, seemingly at the wizard Saruman's orders, with no visible in-universe explanation. What, Shippey asks, was Saruman doing with so much tobacco: a wizard was hardly going to be trading it for profit, nor "issuing" it to his orcs in Isengard. Instead, Shippey suggests, it echoes Britain's shortages just after the Second World War, routinely explained at that time with "the words 'gone for export'". Kocher adds that the devastation and people's responses in the Shire after the War would have been only too familiar to people in the 20th century.

Not all critics have seen the chapter as political; the medievalist Jane Chance notes the "domestic image" of the "Scouring" in the chapter's title, suggesting in her view a "rejuvenation" of the Shire. She describes the chapter's social cleansing of the Shire in similar terms, writing of washing and purifying it of "the reptilian monsters" Sharkey and Wormtongue.

=== A "novelistic" chapter ===
Tolkien critics have noted that the chapter has a distinctive novel-like quality. Birns echoes Plank's comment that the chapter is "fundamentally different from the rest of the book", and states that it is "the most novelistic episode in Tolkien's massive tale". He cites Janet Brennan Croft's description of it as "that deceptively anti-climactic but all-important chapter". Birns argues that it meets three aspects of Ian Watt's definition of the kind of novel read by the middle class, (Note: Birns cites Watt's 1957 The Rise of the Novel (University of California Press), page 48ff.) dominant among the reading public: firstly, it shows multiple social classes interacting; secondly, it is in a domestic context, the homely Shire; thirdly, it favours the point of view of the "emerging and aspiring middle classes". Birns concludes that "'The Scouring of the Shire' is where Tolkien's dark romance bends the most towards the realistic novel of domestic reintegration and redemption." Plank writes that the distinctive feature of the "Scouring" is that unlike in the rest of the book, there are no miracles and the laws of nature work with "full and undisputed force". Saruman, Plank notes, was once able to work magic, but in the chapter he works as a politician, without sorcery: the chapter is "realistic", not fantasy, except for the moment of Saruman's death.

Michael Treschow and Mark Duckworth, writing in Mythlore, note that the return to the Shire emphasises the protagonists' growth in character, so that they can deal with life's challenges for themselves. Just as at the end of The Hobbit Gandalf tells Bilbo that he is "not the hobbit that you were", having learnt from his adventures, so in The Lord of the Rings Gandalf tells Frodo and the other hobbits that he will not be coming to the Shire with them since "you will need no help. You are grown up now. Grown indeed very high; among the great you are, and I have no longer any fear at all for any of you."

=== Wish-fulfilment ===
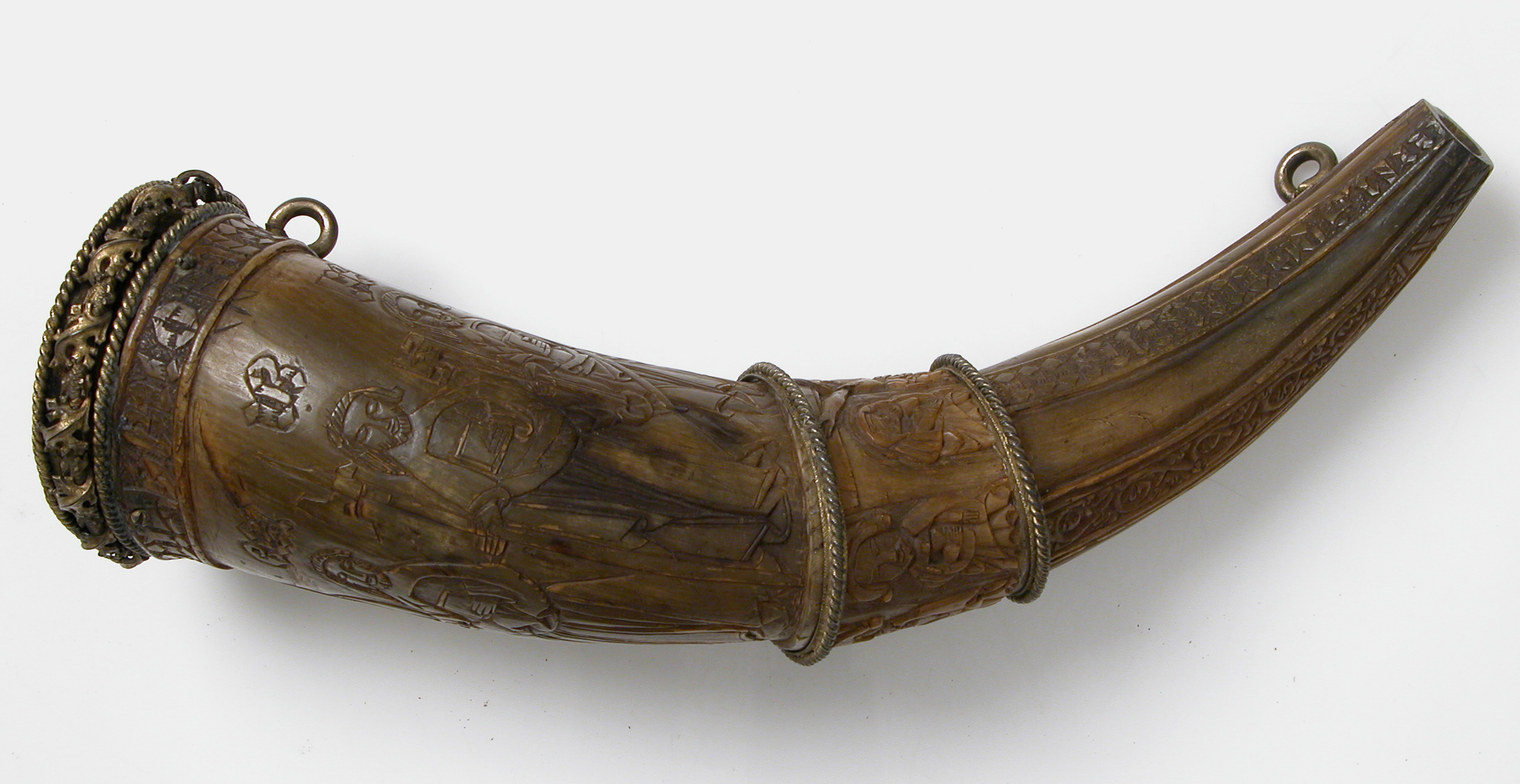
Shippey suggests that Tolkien wished he had Merry's magic horn to bring joy and cleansing to England. Illustrated is a French 15th century hunting horn.

Another element in the chapter is the appearance of Tolkien's own feelings about England. Shippey writes that there is a "streak of 'wish-fulfilment'" in the account, and that Tolkien would have liked "to hear the horns of Rohan blow, and watch the Black Breath (Note: This is an allusion to the Black Breath of the Nazgûl.) of inertia dissolve" from England. More specifically, Shippey applies this idea to "The Scouring of the Shire", noting that Merry returns from Rohan with a horn, brought by Eorl the Young, founder of Rohan, from the dragon-hoard of Scatha the Worm from the North. The horn, he explains, is "a magic one, though only modestly so": blowing it brings joy to his friends in arms, fear to his enemies, and in the chapter, it awakens the "revolution against sloth and shabbiness and Saruman-Sharkey" and quickly gets the Shire purified. Shippey suggests that Tolkien wished to do the same, and notes that with his novels he at least succeeded in bringing joy. Tolkien wrote in a letter that "the man-made ... is ultimately daunting and insupportable", and that "If a Ragnarök would burn all the slums and gas-works, and shabby garages, and long arc-lit suburbs, it [could] for me burn all the works of art – and I'd go back to trees." (Note: Carpenter 2023, Letter 83 to Christopher Tolkien, 6 October 1944) Caitlin Vaughn Carlos writes that Sam Gamgee's exclamation "This is worse than Mordor! ... It comes home to you, they say; because it is home, and you remember it before it was ruined" encapsulates the impulse to nostalgia, since Sam is longing for the remembered home, not the one which now exists.

=== Environmentalism ===
Critics since the 1970s have observed one more theme in the chapter: environmentalism. One of the first to note that "Tolkien was [an] ecologist" was Paul H. Kocher. Birns calls it "as much conservationist as it is traditionalist", writing that it presents a strong pro-environmentalist argument in addition to its other themes. Plank describes the chapter's emphasis on the "deterioration of the environment" "quite unusual for its time", with the returning hobbits finding needless destruction of the old and beautiful, and its replacement by the new and ugly; pollution of air and water; neglect; "and above all, trees wantonly destroyed". Matthew Dickerson and Jonathan Evans look at the chapter from the point of view of rousing people to environmental action in their "own backyard".

=== A pacifist dilemma ===
The scholars Nan Scott and Janet Brennan Croft have commented on the pacifist dilemma embodied in the chapter. The hobbits return home from the War of the Ring, wanting peace, but find themselves obliged to fight, and indeed to lead the fighting, to rid the Shire of the enemy. Scott notes that the hobbits were indeed so innocent and peace-loving that they had set out for Rivendell without weapons; and they are surprised when Tom Bombadil gives them swords from the Barrow-wight's hoard. Aragorn states at Rivendell that the Shire is peaceful only because it is constantly watched by his Rangers. Further, Scott writes, Tolkien shows war to be at once "exhilarating and thrilling", as at the Battle of Helm's Deep, and ugly, as when human heads are catapulted into the besieged Minas Tirith. Frodo feels pity even for Saruman; but his pacifism will not rid the Shire of Saruman's ruffians. Merry, seeing the dilemma, tells Frodo "if there are many of these ruffians ... it will certainly mean fighting".

=== Other opinions ===
Brian Attebery, introducing Birns's article in Journal of the Fantastic in the Arts, notes that Birns calls The Scouring of the Shire "one of the most famous anticlimaxes in literature", and that conventional wisdom is to stop at once when the action has completed. Attebery begs to differ, saying that he likes anticlimaxes, as when Jane Austen's heroes and heroines work everything out in detail once they have at last reached agreement. In his view, the novel "would be much the less" without the chapter.

Tolkien critics John D. Rateliff and Jared Lobdell have compared the sudden shrivelling of Saruman's flesh from his skull at the moment of his death with the instantaneous aging of the protagonist Ayesha in Rider Haggard's 1887 novel She: A History of Adventure, when she bathes in the fire of immortality. Tolkien acknowledged Haggard as a major influence, especially She.

In an interview in 2015, the novelist and screenwriter George R. R. Martin called this section of the Lord of the Rings story brilliant, and said it was the tone he would be aiming for at the end of Game of Thrones.

Jonathon D. Langford, writing in Mythlore, describes the scouring as the hobbits' coming of age, the culmination of their individual quests. He states that Merry and Pippin have clearly matured on their journey, while Frodo and Sam see the success of their quest reassessed by hobbit society. He notes that a heroic quest as described by Joseph Campbell ends with the hero's return from the enchanted lands to the ordinary world, renewing his community, as the hobbits' return does.

== Adaptations ==
Alan Lee's illustration for the chapter, showing the hobbits returning amidst felled trees to a Shire dominated by a tall smoking chimney, has been criticised in Mythlore.

The 1981 BBC The Lord of the Rings radio play covers "The Scouring of the Shire", including the original showdown and ending in which Saruman dies by Wormtongue's knife and Wormtongue is killed by arrows in the Shire.

The events of "The Scouring of the Shire" are retold in the Finnish miniseries Hobitit.

The chapter has been left out of the Lord of the Rings film trilogy, except as a brief flash-forward when Frodo looks into the crystal ball-like Mirror of Galadriel in Peter Jackson's 2001 The Fellowship of the Ring. In the extended edition of The Return of the King, Wormtongue kills Saruman (stabbing him in the back, not slitting his throat) and is in turn killed by an arrow as in the chapter; however, this takes place at Isengard instead of the Shire and it is Legolas who shoots Wormtongue. Peter Jackson called the chapter anticlimactic, and decided in 1998 not to include it in the film trilogy. He decided to merge Saruman's and Wormtongue's death scene with "The Voice of Saruman" chapter from The Two Towers, but did not wish to go back to Isengard after the Battle of Helm's Deep. Jackson explained that in post-production of The Return of the King, the scene felt like a seven-minute wrap up of The Two Towers, gave the film an unsteady beginning, and made the film too long, so it ended up in the extended DVD.

Alan Lee, in the last of his series of 50 illustrations of The Lord of the Rings, depicted the four hobbits of the Fellowship returning on horseback along a hedged lane, with the stumps of recently cut trees and felled trunks in the foreground, and a tall chimney making a plume of dark smoke in the background. The painting was reviewed for Mythlore by Glen GoodKnight, (Note: Founder of the Mythopoeic Society.) who wrote that it was "anti-clima[c]tic, containing no joy, and denying us even the hint of the bitter-sweet resolution of the story".

== See also ==
- The Making of the English Landscape – a non-fiction book by an Oxfordshire author contemporary with Tolkien, concerned about the loss of the historic landscape

== Sources ==
- Birns, Nicholas (2012). "'You Have Grown Very Much': The Scouring of the Shire and the Novelistic Aspects of The Lord of the Rings". Journal of the Fantastic in the Arts. 23 (1): 82–101. JSTOR 24353144.
- Carlos, Caitlin Vaughn (2020). "'Ramble On': Medievalism as a Nostalgic Practice in Led Zeppelin's Use of J.R.R. Tolkien". In Meyer, Stephen C.; Yri, Kirsten (eds.). The Oxford Handbook of Music and Medievalism. Oxford University Press. ISBN 978-0-19-065844-1.
- Carpenter, Humphrey, ed. (2023) [1981]. The Letters of J. R. R. Tolkien: Revised and Expanded Edition. New York: HarperCollins. ISBN 978-0-35-865298-4.
- Chance, Jane (1980) [1979]. Tolkien's Art: 'A Mythology for England'. Papermac. ISBN 978-0-333-29034-7.
- Colebatch, Hal G. P. (October 1989). "Tolkien and his critics". Quadrant. 33 (10): 62–67. ISSN 0033-5002.
- Colebatch, Hal G. P. (2007). "Communism". In Drout, Michael (ed.). The J. R. R. Tolkien Encyclopedia: Scholarship and Critical Assessment. CRC Press/Taylor & Francis. pp. 108–109.
- Croft, Janet Brennan (2004). "'The Scouring of the Shire' and Pacifism". War and the Works of J.R.R. Tolkien. Praeger. pp. 130–. ISBN 978-0-313-32592-2.
- Croft, Janet Brennan (2011). "The Hen that Laid the Eggs: Tolkien and the Officers Training Corps". Tolkien Studies. 8: 97–106. doi:10.1353/tks.2011.0011. S2CID 170747977.
- Dickerson, Matthew; Evans, Jonathan (2006). Ents, Elves, and Eriador: The Environmental Vision of J.R.R. Tolkien. University Press of Kentucky. pp. 215–234. ISBN 0-8131-7159-8.
- Donnelly, Jerome (2018). "Nazis in the Shire: Tolkien and Satire". Mythlore. 37 (1). Article 6.
- Fisher, Jason (2006). "Sauron Defeated". In Drout, Michael D. C. (ed.). The J. R. R. Tolkien Encyclopedia: Scholarship and Critical Assessment. Routledge. ISBN 1-135-88034-4.
- Greenman, David (1992). "Aeneidic and Odyssean Patterns of Escape and Release in Tolkien's 'The Fall of Gondolin' and 'The Return of the King'". Mythlore. 18 (2). Article 1.
- Hammond, Wayne G.; Scull, Christina (2005). The Lord of the Rings: A Reader's Companion. HarperCollins. ISBN 978-0-00-720907-1.
- Hardy, Gene (2013). "'This is worse than Mordor!': The Scouring of the Shire as Conclusion". Cliffs Notes on The Lord of the Rings. Houghton Mifflin Harcourt.
- Hirsch, Bernhard (27 November 2014). "After the "end of all things": The Long Return Home to the Shire". Tolkien Studies. 11 (11): 77–107. doi:10.1353/tks.2014.0015. S2CID 170501504.
- Jackson, Aaron I. (2015). Narrating England: Tolkien, the Twentieth Century, and English Cultural Self-Representation (PDF). Manchester Metropolitan University (PhD thesis). S2CID 151949998. Archived from the original (PDF) on 8 February 2020.
- Kocher, Paul H. (1974) [1972]. Master of Middle-earth: The Achievement of J.R.R. Tolkien. Penguin Books. ISBN 978-0-14-003877-4.
- Langford, Jonathon D. (1991). "The Scouring of the Shire as a Hobbit Coming-of-Age". Mythlore. 18 (1). Article 1, pages 4-9.
- Plank, Robert (1975). "'The Scouring of the Shire': Tolkien's View of Fascism". In Lobdell, Jared (ed.). A Tolkien Compass. Open Court Publishing. pp. 107–115. ISBN 978-0-87548-303-0.
- Richards, Jay; Witt, Jonathan (2014). "The Scouring of the Shire". The Hobbit Party: The Vision of Freedom That Tolkien Got, and the West Forgot. Ignatius Press. ISBN 978-1-58617-823-9.
- Rogers, William N. II; Underwood, Michael R. (2000). "Gagool and Gollum: Exemplars of Degeneration in King Solomon's Mines and The Hobbit". In Sir George Clark (ed.). J.R.R. Tolkien and His Literary Resonances: Views of Middle-earth. Greenwood Publishing Group. pp. 121–132. ISBN 978-0-313-30845-1.
- Scott, Nan C. (1972). "War and Pacifism in The Lord of the Rings". Tolkien Journal. 5 (1). Article 9.
- Shippey, Tom (2001). J. R. R. Tolkien: Author of the Century. HarperCollins. pp. 219–220. ISBN 978-0261-10401-3.
- Shippey, Tom (2005) [1982]. The Road to Middle-Earth (Third ed.). Grafton (HarperCollins). ISBN 978-0-261-10275-0.
- Sturgis, Amy H. (2007). "Lord of the Rings, The". In Drout, Michael (ed.). The J. R. R. Tolkien Encyclopedia: Scholarship and Critical Assessment. CRC Press/Taylor & Francis. pp. 385–390.
- Tolkien, J. R. R. (1955). The Return of the King. ISBN 978-0-00-713657-5.
- Tolkien, J. R. R. (1966). The Fellowship of the Ring. Foreword to the Second Edition. ISBN 978-0-00-713657-5.
- Treschow, Michael; Duckworth, Mark (2006). "Bombadil's Role in The Lord of the Rings". Mythlore. 25 (1): article 13.
- Waito, David M. (2010). "The Shire Quest: The 'Scouring of the Shire' as the Narrative and Thematic Focus of The Lord of the Rings". Mythlore. 28 (3–4): 155–177.
