= Heroism in The Lord of the Rings =

Theme in Tolkien's fiction

J. R. R. Tolkien's presentation of heroism in The Lord of the Rings is based on medieval tradition, but modifies it, as there is no single hero but a combination of heroes with contrasting attributes. Aragorn is the man born to be a hero, of a line of kings; he emerges from the wilds and is uniformly bold and restrained. Frodo is an unheroic, home-loving Hobbit who has heroism thrust upon him when he learns that the ring he has inherited from his cousin Bilbo is the One Ring that would enable the Dark Lord Sauron to dominate the whole of Middle-earth. His servant Sam sets out to take care of his beloved master, and rises through the privations of the quest to destroy the Ring to become heroic.

Scholars have seen the quest of the dissimilar heroes Aragorn and Frodo as a psychological journey of individuation, and from a mythic point of view of marking the end of the old—in Frodo's quest with its bitter ending, and the start of the new, in Aragorn's.

The heroic aspects of The Lord of the Rings derive from sources including Beowulf and Anglo-Saxon culture, seen especially in the society of the Riders of Rohan and its leaders Théoden, Éomer, and Éowyn; and from Germanic, especially Old Norse, myth and legend, seen for example in the culture of the Dwarves.

== Origins ==
=== Beowulf's heroic culture ===
Tolkien was a philologist and an expert in heroic Anglo-Saxon culture and literature, especially Beowulf. He derived many aspects of The Lord of the Rings from the poem, including the heroic culture of the Riders of Rohan, who resemble the Anglo-Saxons in everything including their Old English language, except for Rohan's widespread use of horses. Théoden's hall, Meduseld (the word means "mead hall" in Beowulf), is modelled on Beowulf's Heorot, as is the way it is guarded, visitors being repeatedly but courteously challenged. The warhorns of the Riders of Rohan exemplify, in Shippey's view, the "heroic Northern world", as in what he calls the nearest Beowulf has to a moment of Tolkien-like eucatastrophe, when Ongentheow's Geats, trapped all night, hear the horns of Hygelac's men coming to rescue them; the Riders blow their horns wildly as they finally arrive, turning the tide of the Battle of the Pelennor Fields at a climactic moment in The Lord of the Rings. (Note: Tolkien 1955, book 5, ch. 4, "The Siege of Gondor")

=== Norse heroic culture ===
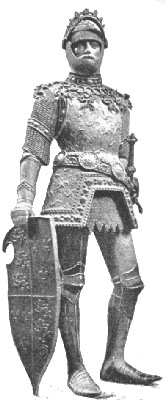
The Lord of the Rings heroes Frodo and Aragorn both have magic swords, like King Arthur (16th century statue pictured).

Tolkien took the concept of Northern courage from Norse mythology, where even the gods know they are doomed and everything comes to an end. The Tolkien scholar Marjorie Burns writes that the theme of courageous action in the face of inevitable loss in The Lord of the Rings is borrowed from the Nordic world view which emphasises "imminent or threatening destruction". In Norse mythology, this began during the creation: in the realm of fire, Muspell, the jötunn Surt was even then awaiting the end of the world. Burns comments that "Here is a mythology where even the gods can die".

=== Receiving the magic sword ===
The Tolkien scholar Verlyn Flieger writes that heroes like Sigurd in the Volsungasaga have named, magic swords, and that acquiring such a weapon is a key moment in becoming a hero. Frodo is given his sword by his "uncle", Bilbo – Flieger comments that the uncle-nephew relationship is also traditional for pairs of heroes, such as Cuchulainn and Conchobar, Tristan and Mark, Roland and Charlemagne, Gawain and Arthur, and Beowulf and Hygelac.

Flieger notes however that while Sigmund's sword was broken, and it was reforged for Sigurd, Frodo already had a sword: it was broken by the Lord of the Nazgûl, and he never carries it again. In the Volsungasaga, the god Odin thrusts the sword into a tree; Sigmund acquires it by pulling it out. Similarly, Arthur pulls his sword out of an iron anvil; Galahad, in another Arthurian legend, pulls his sword from a stone, magically floating in a lake. Flieger writes that Tolkien reverses the order of events: Frodo's sword has already been broken, so Bilbo produces his own small sword, Sting, from his adventures long ago, as narrated in The Hobbit, casually thrusts it into a wooden beam in his room in Rivendell, and suggests that Frodo might like it. Frodo pulls it out without fuss, an unheroic hero, but "the torch has passed" and Frodo is "align[ed] with his epic forebears".

Aragorn too has a sword which was broken: the ancient and magical sword Narsil, of his distant ancestor Elendil, whose son Isildur used it to defeat the Dark Lord Sauron by cutting the Ring from his hand. Like Frodo, Aragorn arrives in Rivendell, and there he too receives a magic weapon: his sword is reforged, as Andúril, "Flame of the West". Unlike Frodo's acquisition of Sting, the transformation of Narsil to Andúril is directly heroic; but both weapons, like the magic swords of medieval legend, shine with their own light in the presence of enemies.

=== Fairy tale ===
Tolkien's essay On Fairy-Stories was delivered as an Andrew Lang lecture in 1939 and published in different collections of his essays from 1947 onwards. In it, Tolkien makes clear that he considers fairy tales an important genre, which he explains and defends; the essence of a fairy story is the universal journey of the hero, the traveller through life, facing the dangers, seeking his desires including the "Escape from Death", and emerging victorious. (Note: Tolkien 1964, "On Fairy-Stories", pp. 11–70)

== Analysis ==
Diagram of Patrick Grant's Jungian view of The Lord of the Rings with hero, anima and other archetypes; the hero is composed both of the noble Aragorn and the small home-loving Frodo.

=== Jungian archetypes ===
Patrick Grant, a scholar of Renaissance literature, interpreted the interactions of the characters as fitting the oppositions and other pairwise relationships of Jungian archetypes, recurring psychological symbols proposed by Carl Jung. He stated that the Hero archetype appears in The Lord of the Rings both in noble and powerful form as Aragorn, and in childlike form as Frodo, whose quest can be interpreted as a personal journey of individuation. They are opposed by the Ringwraiths. Frodo's anima is the Elf-queen Galadriel; the Hero is assisted by the Old Wise Man archetype in the shape of the Wizard Gandalf. Frodo's Shadow is the monstrous Gollum, appropriately in Grant's view, also a male Hobbit like Frodo. All of these, together with other characters in the book, create an image of the self.

=== Contrasted heroes ===
Flieger contrasts the warrior-hero Aragorn with the suffering hero Frodo. Aragorn is, like Beowulf, an epic/romance hero, a bold leader and a healer-king. Frodo is "the little man of fairy tale", the little brother who unexpectedly turns out to be brave. But the fairy tale happy ending comes to Aragorn, marrying the beautiful princess (Arwen) and winning the kingdom (Gondor and Arnor); while Frodo, who returns home miserable, with neither Ring nor appreciation by the people of the Shire, gets "defeat and disillusionment—the stark, bitter ending typical of the Iliad, Beowulf, the Morte D'Arthur". In other words, the two types of hero are not only contrasted, but combined, halves of their legends swapped over. Flieger comments that the two together mark the end of the old, with Frodo's bitter end and the disappearance of the Ring, the Elves, and much else that was beautiful; and the start of the new, with Aragorn's rise to the throne of Gondor and Arnor, and a world of Men.

Flieger's analysis of heroes in Beowulf, fairy tales, and The Lord of the Rings
Beowulf	Fairy tale hero	Aragorn	Frodo
Bold hero, victorious	—	Battle of Helm's Deep, Battle of the Pelennor Fields	—
—	Small beginnings: Little man sets out on quest	—	Hobbit (small man) feels unheroic, accepts quest unwillingly; sets out not knowing where he's going
Bitter ending	—	—	Defeat and disillusionment after the quest
—	Happy ending: Returns home rich, marries princess	King of Gondor and Arnor; Marries Elf-princess Arwen	—

The Tolkien scholars Thomas Honegger and John D. Rateliff write that this "important" argument of Flieger's was so convincing that it remained unchallenged until in 2000 George Clark pointed to Sam as the "true hero".

=== Unheroic hero ===
A third figure takes on the mantle of hero in the story, Samwise "Sam" Gamgee, Frodo's gardener. He sets out entirely unheroically, like Frodo a Hobbit but even less significant than him, being his gardener. He begins the quest as a servant, but through service comes to be a genuinely heroic figure, his simple courage and devotion sustaining the quest. Tolkien wrote in a private letter: "My Sam Gamgee is indeed a reflexion of the English soldier, of the privates and batmen I knew in the 1914 war, and recognised as so far superior to myself." and elsewhere: "Sam was cocksure, and deep down a little conceited; but his conceit had been transformed by his devotion to Frodo. He did not think of himself as heroic or even brave, or in any way admirable – except in his service and loyalty to his master." (Note: Carpenter 2023, letter 246 to Eileen Elgar, September 1963) He ends up as mayor of the Shire for seven seven-year terms. (Note: Tolkien 1955, Appendix B, "The Tale of Years", "Later Events Concerning the Members of the Fellowship of the Ring") Tolkien admired heroism born of loyalty and love, but despised arrogance, pride and wilfulness, notes the scholar Elizabeth Solopova. The courage and loyalty that Sam displayed on his journey with Frodo, she adds, is the kind of northern courage that Tolkien praised in his essays on the Old English poem "The Battle of Maldon".

=== Unchivalric heroes ===
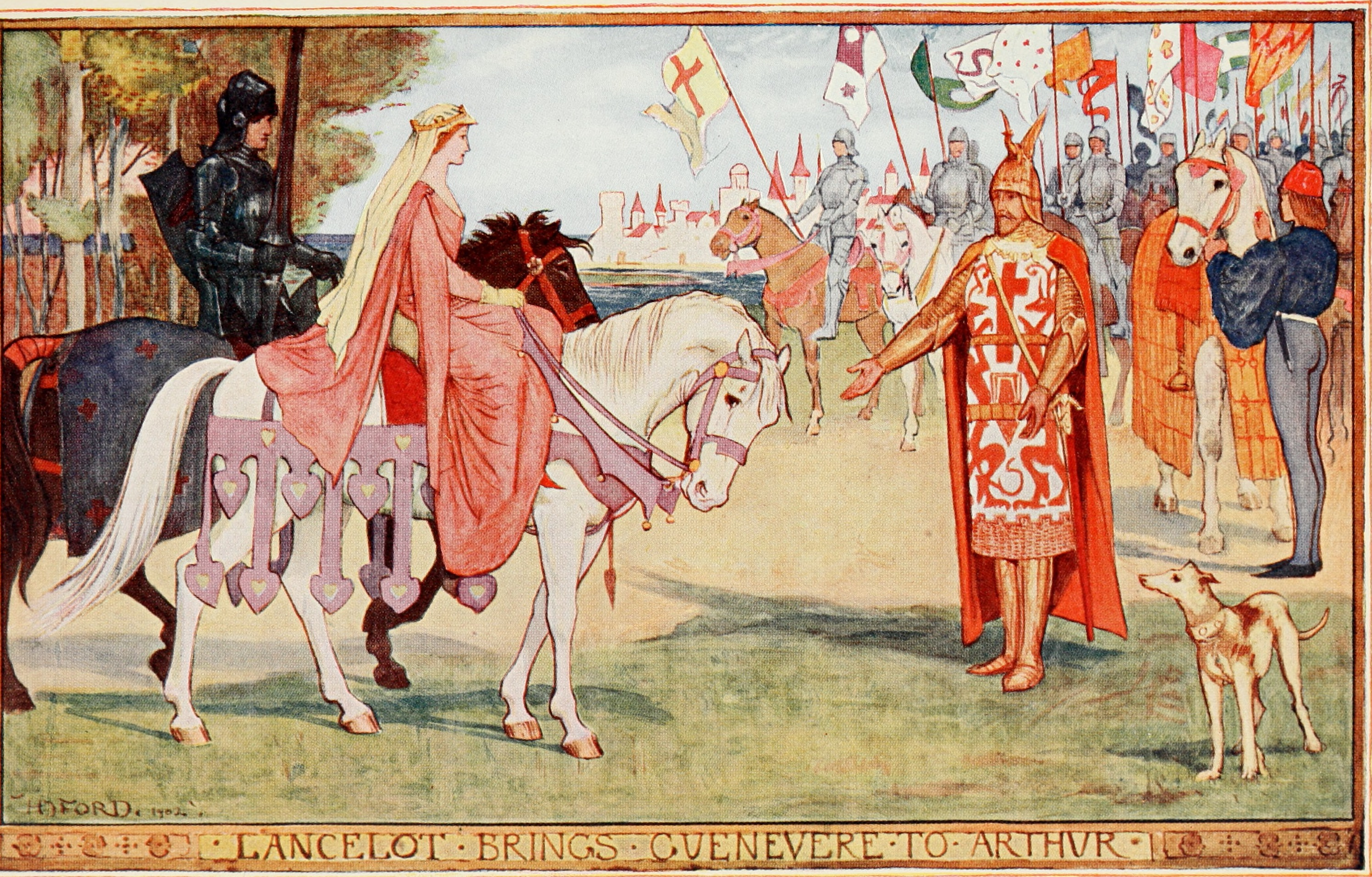
Tolkien rejected the armoured nobility and courtly love of the chivalric knight (illustrated) in favour of small humble hobbits and half-wild, mistrusted rangers as his heroes.

Ben Reinhard writes in Mythlore that Aragorn and Frodo lack one traditional component of heroism, indeed of the heroic romance that Tolkien was popularising: knightly chivalry. He notes that Tolkien does use the word "knight", but ties it to a pre-chivalric concept of knighthood, that of Old English heroes like Beowulf rather than Arthurian chivalric heroes like Lancelot and Galahad. Further, while there are heroic supporting characters – Reinhard mentions Bard, Beorn, Gandalf, and Thorin, none of them are chivalric either. Knights on horseback in shining armour do exist: the men of Dol Amroth come to Minas Tirith as "knights in full harness", (Note: Tolkien 1955, book 5, ch. 1, "Minas Tirith") and their prince, Imrahil, wears "bright-burnished vambrace[s]". (Note: Tolkien 1955, book 5, ch. 6, "The Battle of the Pelennor Fields") All the same, Reinhard writes, knights are certainly played down in the narrative. He notes that this might seem surprising, and discusses why Tolkien decided on a heroism without chivalry. Tolkien disliked the connection of chivalric romance with French culture: he expressed distaste for both its food and its language. Further, he regretted that almost all of England's pre-Christian mythology had been lost; he set out to create a mythology for England. That meant that Tolkien could hardly introduce French-style chivalric knights, so he needed "a new kind of hero—or, better yet, two kinds of hero: the halfling and the ranger. In place of the powerful and noble knight errant, we have (on the one hand) the modern, bourgeois, and above all small hobbits or (on the other) the half-wild, mistrusted rangers." Reinhard observes that this allows the Catholic Tolkien to express the Christian vision as described in the Magnificat of "put[ting] down the mighty from their seat, and exalt[ing] the humble and meek".

Ben Reinhard's comparison of Tolkien's heroes and traditional chivalric knights
Type of hero	Example	Characteristics
Chivalric knight	Lancelot	Noble, French-style; powerful, armoured, on horseback; courtly love; success assured
Hobbit	Frodo Baggins	"modern, bourgeois, ... small"; humble; success far from guaranteed
Ranger	Aragorn	"half-wild, mistrusted"; "stern in battle, gentle in hall"; ascetic; universally scorned
