= Pippin Took =

Hobbit character in The Lord of the Rings

Peregrin Took
- Middle-earth character

In-universe information
- Alias: Pippin
- Race: Hobbit (Fallohide branch) (Note: Tolkien 1954a, "Prologue" 1. "Concerning Hobbits")
- Affiliation: Company of the Ring
- Book(s): The Lord of the Rings

Peregrin Took (Westron: Razanur Tûk), commonly known simply as Pippin, is a fictional character from J. R. R. Tolkien's fantasy novel The Lord of the Rings. He is closely tied with his friend and cousin, Merry Brandybuck, and the two are together during most of the story. Pippin and Merry are introduced as a pair of young hobbits of the Shire who become ensnared in their friend Frodo Baggins's quest to destroy the One Ring. Pippin joins the Company of the Ring. He and Merry become separated from the rest of the group at the breaking of the Fellowship and spend much of The Two Towers with their own storyline. Impetuous and curious, Pippin enlists as a soldier in the army of Gondor and fights in the Battle of the Morannon. With the other hobbits, he returns home, helps to lead the Scouring of the Shire, and becomes Thain, or hereditary leader of the land.

Commentators have noted that the actions of Merry and Pippin serve to throw light on the characters of the good and bad lords Théoden of Rohan and Denethor of Gondor, while their simple humour acts as a foil for the higher romance involving kings and the heroic Aragorn.

== Fictional history ==
Pippin is the only son and heir of Paladin Took II, the aristocratic and independent Thain of the Shire, who farms at Whitwell near the Three Farthing Stone (Note: There used to be a Three Shires Oak at Whitwell, Derbyshire, a village in the middle of England.) in the Tookland, and his wife Eglantine Banks. He has three older sisters, Pearl Took, Pimpernel Took, and Pervinca Took. His best friend Meriadoc (Merry) Brandybuck, is his cousin; another good friend is Frodo Baggins. (Note: Tolkien 1955, book 5, ch. 1 "Minas Tirith) (Note: Tolkien 1955, Appendix C, "Family Trees")

Pippin is the youngest of the four Hobbits who set out from the Shire, and the only one who has not yet come of age. (Note: Hobbits come of age when they become 33 years old.) At Rivendell, Elrond reluctantly chooses Merry and Pippin as the last two members of the Company of the Ring. (Note: Tolkien 1954a, book 2, ch. 3 "The Ring goes South")

While crossing the Misty Mountains through the tunnels of Moria, Pippin decides to drop a stone down a deep hole. It seems to waken something far below, which signals by tapping with a hammer; Gandalf calls Pippin a "fool of a Took". The Company is pursued by dangerous enemies including Orcs, Trolls, and a Balrog. (Note: Tolkien 1954a, book 2, ch. 4, "A Journey in the Dark") (Note: Tolkien 1954a, book 2, ch. 5, "The Bridge of Khazad-Dum") The Company recuperates in Lothlórien; Pippin is given a brooch by the elf-queen Galadriel. (Note: Tolkien 1954a, book 2, ch. 8, "Farewell to Lórien")

The Company goes downriver on the Anduin to Parth Galen, where Merry and Pippin are captured by Orcs. (Note: Tolkien 1954, book 3, ch. 1 "The Departure of Boromir") While held captive, he purposefully drops his elven brooch as a sign for Aragorn, Legolas, and Gimli, who are in pursuit. (Note: Tolkien 1954, book 3, ch. 3 "The Uruk-hai") During a skirmish among his captors, Pippin and Merry escape and meet the tree-giant Treebeard, leader of the Ents. They rouse the Ents against the wizard Saruman, and see his stronghold of Isengard destroyed. Treebeard's "Ent-draught" makes Merry and Pippin grow to become the tallest hobbits in history. (Note: Tolkien 1954, book 3, ch. 4 "Treebeard")

Gríma Wormtongue, Saruman's spy among the Rohirrim, throws Saruman's palantír, a stone of seeing, at members of the Company. (Note: Tolkien 1954, book 3, ch. 10 "The Voice of Saruman") Pippin, without asking permission, takes the stone from the sleeping Wizard Gandalf, looks into it, and sees Sauron himself. To keep Pippin safe from Sauron's forces, Gandalf takes him to the city of Minas Tirith, capital of Gondor, separating him from his friends. (Note: Tolkien 1954, book 3, ch. 11, "The Palantír") Sauron wrongly, and disastrously, assumes that Pippin is the hobbit with the One Ring, and that he is Saruman's prisoner.

In Minas Tirith, Pippin is brought to the city's Steward, Denethor, and volunteers to serve him out of respect for Denethor's son Boromir, who had died trying to defend Merry and Pippin from the Orcs. According to Gandalf, this gesture touches Denethor, who accepts the hobbit's offer and makes him one of the Guards of the Citadel. The soldier Beregond is tasked with assisting Pippin in getting started with his new duties. When Denethor despairs and sets out to burn his son Faramir and himself alive in the street of tombs, Rath Dínen, Pippin fetches Gandalf and Beregond. This saves Faramir's life, but takes Gandalf away from the Battle of the Pelennor Fields at a crucial moment. (Note: Tolkien 1955, book 5, ch. 7 "The Pyre of Denethor")

Pippin is the only hobbit to join the Army of the West, led by Aragorn, as it assaults the Black Gate of Mordor, in a feint to distract Sauron from the One Ring's journey towards Mount Doom. During the resulting battle, Pippin kills a troll, who falls on him. Gimli notices his feet under the troll and drags him out, saving his life. (Note: Tolkien 1955, book 5, ch. 10 "The Black Gate Opens")

Returning home, he and Merry rouse the Hobbits of the Shire to destroy Saruman's forces during the Scouring of the Shire, achieving greater fame in their homeland than Frodo. (Note: Tolkien 1955, book 6, ch. 8 "The Scouring of the Shire") He marries Diamond of Long Cleeve; they have a son, Faramir. He later becomes the Took, head of his clan, and Thain of the Shire. Like Merry, he is buried as a hero alongside King Aragorn in Gondor. (Note: Tolkien 1955, Appendix B, "Later Events Concerning the Members of the Fellowship of the Ring")

== Analysis ==
Pippin (left) and Merry, in Ralph Bakshi's animated version of The Lord of the Rings

The critic Jane Chance discusses the role of Pippin and his friend Merry, another hobbit, in illuminating the contrast between what she calls the "good and bad Germanic lords Théoden and Denethor". She writes that the two leaders receive the allegiance of a hobbit, but very differently: Denethor, Steward of Gondor, undervalues Pippin because he is small, and binds him with a formal oath, whereas Theoden, King of Rohan, treats Merry with love, which the hobbit responds to.

The Tolkien scholar Tom Shippey notes that Tolkien uses the two hobbits and their low simple humour as foils for the much higher romance to which he was aspiring with the more heroic and kingly figures of Théoden, Denethor, and Aragorn: an unfamiliar and old-fashioned writing style that might otherwise, Shippey writes, have lost his readers entirely. He notes that Pippin and Merry serve, too, as guides to introduce the reader to seeing the various non-human characters, letting the reader know that an ent looks like an old tree stump or "almost like the figure of some gnarled old man". The two apparently minor hobbits have another role, too, Shippey writes: it is to remain of good courage when even strong men start to doubt whether victory is possible, as when Pippin comforts the soldier of Gondor, Beregond, as the hordes of Mordor approach Minas Tirith.

"Pitch-perfect" casting: Billy Boyd as Pippin in Peter Jackson's The Lord of the Rings: The Fellowship of the Ring

A fourth purpose, notes the Tolkien scholar Paul Kocher, is given by Tolkien himself, in the words of the wizard Gandalf: "the young hobbits ... were brought to Fangorn, and their coming was like the falling of small stones that starts an avalanche in the mountains." Kocher observes that Tolkien is describing Merry and Pippin's role in the same terms as he spells out Gollum's purpose and Gandalf's "reincarnation"; in Kocher's words, the "finger of Providence" can be glimpsed: "All are filling roles written for them by the same great playwright." For Amy Amendt-Raduege, Pippin's "simple optimism" touches Beregond. That change in mood is enough to cause Beregond to react swiftly some days later, when Pippin tells him of Denethor's intention to burn Faramir alive. Pippin's decisiveness in fetching Gandalf completes the rescue of Faramir.

Gregory Bassham and Eric Bronson's The Hobbit and Philosophy notes that Pippin, who starts out on the quest playful and childish is radically, and in their view unusually for Tolkien, rapidly altered by his experience of seeing Sauron in the palantír: before it he is "thoughtless and immature"; the "terrifying encounter" shocks him into a "rapid ethical makeover".

Fleming Rutledge compares one event to the Last Supper, the feast commemorated by the Eucharist. Pippin has a sunlit morning meal with his friend Beregond in Minas Tirith just before the coming of the long-expected storm as the forces of Minas Morgul assault the city. Rutledge comments that this "creates a remarkable mood. One might even think of Jesus with his disciples at the Last Supper". Indeed, very soon all who cannot fight leave the city, it grows cold, and a Nazgûl flies ominously across the sun; Rutledge remarks on the biblical echoes.

== Adaptations ==
In Ralph Bakshi's 1978 animated version of The Lord of the Rings, Pippin was voiced by Dominic Guard. In the 1980 Rankin/Bass Animated Entertainment television film The Return of the King, the character was voiced by Sonny Melendrez. In the 1981 BBC radio serial The Lord of the Rings, Pippin was played by John McAndrew. The character was portrayed by Vadim Nikitin in the 1991 Soviet TV adaptation Khraniteli, wearing sideburns, eyeglasses and a hat. Jari Pehkonen played Peregrin Took in the 1993 Finnish miniseries Hobitit. In Peter Jackson's The Lord of the Rings film trilogy, Pippin is played by Billy Boyd. The casting of the film series has been called "pitch-perfect".
