= Company of the Ring =

Theme in Tolkien's fantasy

The Company of the Ring, also called the Fellowship of the Ring and the Nine Walkers, is a fictional group of nine representatives from the free peoples of Middle-earth: Elves, Dwarves, Men, and Hobbits; and a Wizard. The group is described in the first volume of The Lord of the Rings, itself titled The Fellowship of the Ring. The book's author, J. R. R. Tolkien, chose the number nine to match and oppose the nine Black Riders or Ringwraiths.

Scholars have commented that Tolkien saw community as the right way to live. They note, too, that the Company is diverse both in culture and in personal qualities, and bound together by friendship, a model very different from the western image of the lone hero. Tolkien uses the term "company" far more often than "fellowship", the word coming from Latin companio, a person who shares bread, suggesting a co-traveller on the road or a group with a shared purpose. The Company of the Ring has been likened to the Arthurian order of the Knights of the Round Table, a group that has many points of similarity including a person carrying the burden of a quest, a returning King, an accompanying Wizard, and a treacherous knight.

== Context ==
J. R. R. Tolkien (1892–1973) was an English Roman Catholic writer, poet, philologist, and academic, best known as the author of the high fantasy works The Hobbit, published in 1937, and its sequel The Lord of the Rings, published in 1954–55. Set in the fictional world of Middle-earth, The Lord of the Rings is one of the best-selling books ever written, with over 150 million copies sold.

== Narrative ==
Image map with clickable links of the north-west of Middle-earth at the end of the Third Age

The main plot of The Lord of the Rings is a quest to destroy the One Ring, to prevent it from falling into the hands of its creator, the Dark Lord Sauron. (Note: Tolkien 1954a, book 2, ch. 2 "The Council of Elrond") A council is held in Rivendell to decide how to achieve this. A hobbit, Frodo Baggins, is to bear the Ring to the land of Mordor to destroy it in the fires of Mount Doom. He is to be assisted by a Company representing the Free Peoples of Middle-earth. (Note: Tolkien 1954a, book 2, ch.3, "The Ring Goes South") Elrond announces that

The Company of the Ring shall be Nine; and the Nine Walkers shall be set against the Nine Riders that are evil...

The Company sets out on the quest at the beginning of winter. It is led by the Wizard Gandalf; he takes the company south through the wild lands of Eriador. They attempt to cross the Misty Mountains, but are driven back. Instead, they travel through the mines of Moria. (Note: Tolkien 1954a, book 2, ch. 4, "A Journey in the Dark") Gandalf falls while fighting a Balrog there, allowing the others to escape. (Note: Tolkien 1954a, book 2, ch. 5, "The Bridge of Khazad-Dum") Aragorn leads the Fellowship to Lothlórien, (Note: Tolkien 1954a, book 2, ch. 6 "Lothlórien") and then in boats down the River Anduin. (Note: Tolkien 1954a, book 2, ch. 9 "The Great River")

After some days on the river, the Company camp at Parth Galen to decide what to do. The next day, the Company is broken. While the others argue about the route to take, Frodo slips away and Boromir follows him. Boromir demands the Ring from Frodo. To escape, Frodo puts on the Ring, making himself invisible. (Note: Tolkien 1954a book 2, ch. 10, "The Breaking of the Fellowship") Merry and Pippin are captured by a group of Orcs. Boromir is killed defending them. (Note: Tolkien 1954, book 3, ch. 1 "The Uruk-hai") Aragorn, Legolas and Gimli give Boromir's body a boat burial; (Note: Tolkien 1954, book 3, ch. 1 "The Departure of Boromir") they then set off in pursuit of Merry and Pippin. (Note: Tolkien 1954, book 3, ch. 2 "The Riders of Rohan") Sam catches up with Frodo as he, still invisible, sets out to cross the river in one of the boats; the two of them set out together to Mordor. Frodo and Sam manage, after many hardships, to reach Mount Doom. The Ring is destroyed, and Sauron is utterly vanquished. The Company of the Ring is victorious. (Note: Tolkien 1955, book 6, ch. 3 "Mount Doom")

The Nine Walkers of the Company
Race	Name	Description
Maia	Gandalf	A Wizard, guide of the Company
Elf	Legolas	Prince of Mirkwood
Dwarf	Gimli	Dwarf of the Lonely Mountain
Man	Aragorn	Ranger of the North, heir to the throne of Gondor
Man	Boromir	Heir to the Steward of Gondor
Hobbit	Frodo Baggins	Bearer of the One Ring
Hobbit	Samwise Gamgee	Frodo's gardener
Hobbit	Merry Brandybuck	Heir to the Master of Buckland
Hobbit	Pippin Took	Heir to the Thain of the Shire

== Analysis ==
=== Theme of community ===
The Inklings scholar Ariel Little writes that Tolkien saw community as the "ideal model for life". This desired type of community, as seen in the Company of the Ring, is specifically diverse, in culture and in personal qualities, a team bound together by friendship and relying completely on the strengths of each individual member to forward the common cause. This is the reverse of the character of what Tolkien states is the evil assemblage that opposes the Company, who are in Little's words "homogeneous, discordant, and intensely individualistic." Little comments that this "community-based model of heroism" is radically unlike the western image of the lone hero. The Christian theologian Ralph C. Wood writes that "the greatness of the Nine Walkers lies in the modesty of both their abilities and accomplishments. Their strength lies in their weakness, in their solidarity as a company unwilling to wield controlling power over others." Rebecca Munro notes that in the Company, "no one acts alone without dependence on the deeds of others". Little adds that even when the Company is split into smaller groups, it is not destroyed; the three smaller groups—Frodo and Sam on the way to Mordor; Merry and Pippin supporting each other; Aragorn, Legolas, and Gimli acting as a team—continue to function as communities.

Nine Walkers vs Nine Riders: the free Company of the Ring is opposed to the enslaved Nine Nazgûl. Tolkien made the two groups match in number but differ sharply in character.

Martina Juričková writes in Mallorn that Tolkien uses the term "company" far more often than "fellowship" to describe the group: "company" appears more than 130 times, against just 9 for "fellowship". She notes that Tolkien was a philologist, fully aware of the etymologies of these terms, and the resulting slight differences in their meanings. "Company" and "companion" are from the Latin companio, in turn from con ("with") and panis ("bread"), hence "person who shares bread [with you]", such as a co-traveller or a member of a group with a shared purpose. "Fellow", on the other hand, derives from Old English feolaga, "a fee-layer", a person who joins in a financial venture. Juričková comments that this could mean an equal, "a peer with whom I have something in common"; but that in modern English it can equally well mean someone "of lower rank or considered to be of little importance or worth" (as in "that fellow over there"). That would explain, she suggests, why Tolkien could use "fellowship" with its positive connotations, while avoiding the loosely-used word "fellow" for the Nine Walkers.

=== Arthurian origins ===
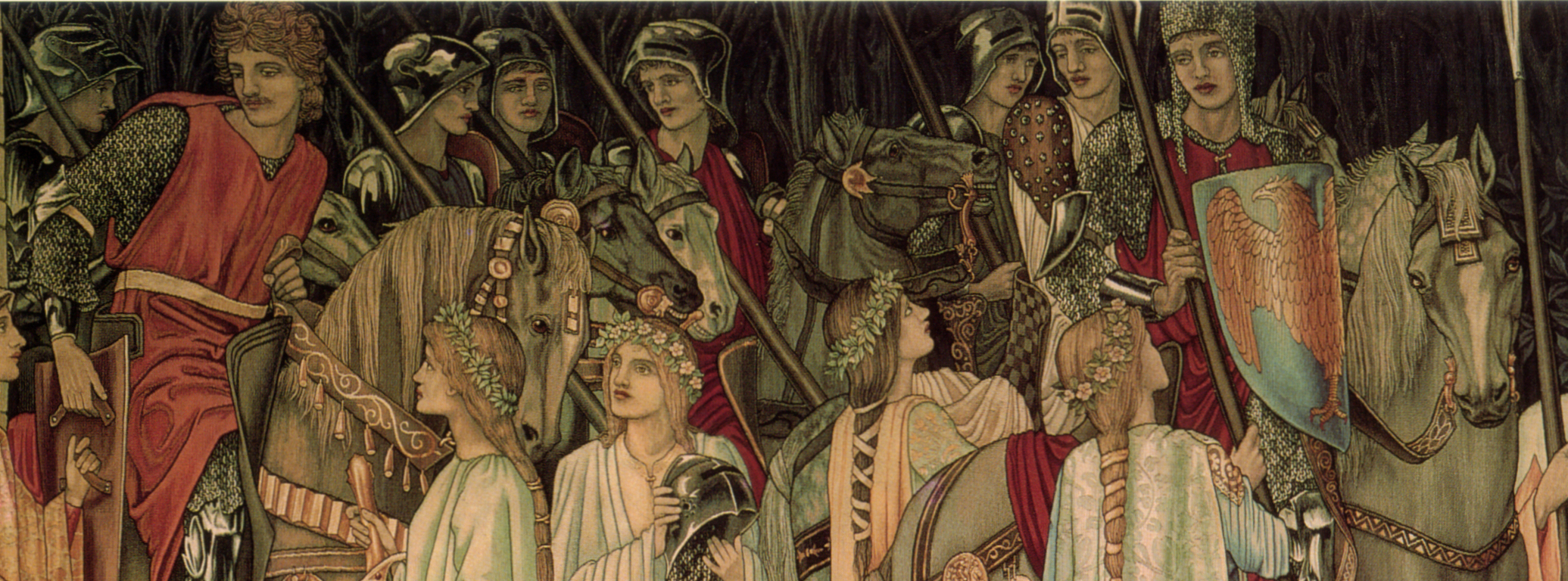
Scholars have likened the Company of the Ring to the Knights of the Round Table. Detail of The Arming and Departure of the Knights, 19th-century tapestry by Edward Burne-Jones, William Morris, and John Henry Dearle

Tolkien scholars note that while Tolkien criticised the mythology of King Arthur, and disliked its explicit mentions of Christian themes, there are multiple parallels in his writings, not least of Aragorn to King Arthur, suggesting that Tolkien certainly made use of the mythology. Laura Gálvez-Gómez specifically likens the Company of the Ring to the Arthurian order of the Knights of the Round Table. In both, there is "a chosen hero who carries the main burden" on a quest, a returning King with the gift of healing, an accompanying Wizard, a treacherous knight, and "a hero without courtly manners who finally becomes a knight".

Laura Gálvez-Gómez's analysis of Arthurian features of the Company
Element	Company of the Ring	Order of the Round Table
Unifying symbol	One Ring; All of Middle-earth	Round Table; Equality, loyalty, and friendship
Returning King	Aragorn * raised by Elves * Inherits sword Andúril	Arthur * Raised among fairies * Inherits sword Excalibur
Wizard, King's adviser	Gandalf; Mithrandir	Merlin; Myrddin
Burden-carrier	Frodo * Ring-bearer	Galahad or Perceval * Grail Knight
Most loyal knight	Sam	Bedivere
Treacherous knight	Boromir	Agravain, Mordred
Minor knight	Meriadoc Brandybuck	Meriadoc
No courtly manners, becomes a knight	Peregrin Took	Perceval

== In adaptations ==
The members of the Company as portrayed in Peter Jackson's 2001 film The Lord of the Rings: The Fellowship of the Ring. From left to right: (top row) Aragorn, Gandalf, Legolas, Boromir, (bottom row) Sam, Frodo, Merry, Pippin, Gimli. The casting is widely admired. Even Tolkien scholars hostile to the films admired the casting and costumes. The hobbits and dwarf were made to appear to scale by methods including scale doubles of film sets, forced perspective, green-screening, and choosing actors of differing heights.

All the members of the Company of the Ring are portrayed in Peter Jackson's 2001 film The Lord of the Rings: The Fellowship of the Ring. According to Rotten Tomatoes, a consensus of film critics described the casting as "pitch-perfect". The Company was played by the following actors:

- Elijah Wood as Frodo Baggins
- Ian McKellen as Gandalf the Grey
- Viggo Mortensen as Aragorn
- Sean Bean as Boromir
- Sean Astin as Samwise Gamgee
- Dominic Monaghan as Meriadoc Brandybuck
- John Rhys-Davies as Gimli
- Orlando Bloom as Legolas
- Billy Boyd as Peregrin Took

Tolkien scholars were divided about Jackson's film representation of Tolkien's novel, but even scholars generally hostile to the film version have respected its visual presentation, admiring the casting, costumes, props, and cinematography. The diminutive scale of the four hobbits, and of the dwarf Gimli, was achieved by the use of several methods, including scale doubles of film sets, forced perspective, and green-screening to combine reduced images of hobbits and dwarf with unscaled images of the other members of the Company. To make the dwarf appear slightly taller than the hobbits without requiring additional scale doubles, a tall actor was chosen to play the dwarf.
