= Nicholas Birns =

Scholar of literature

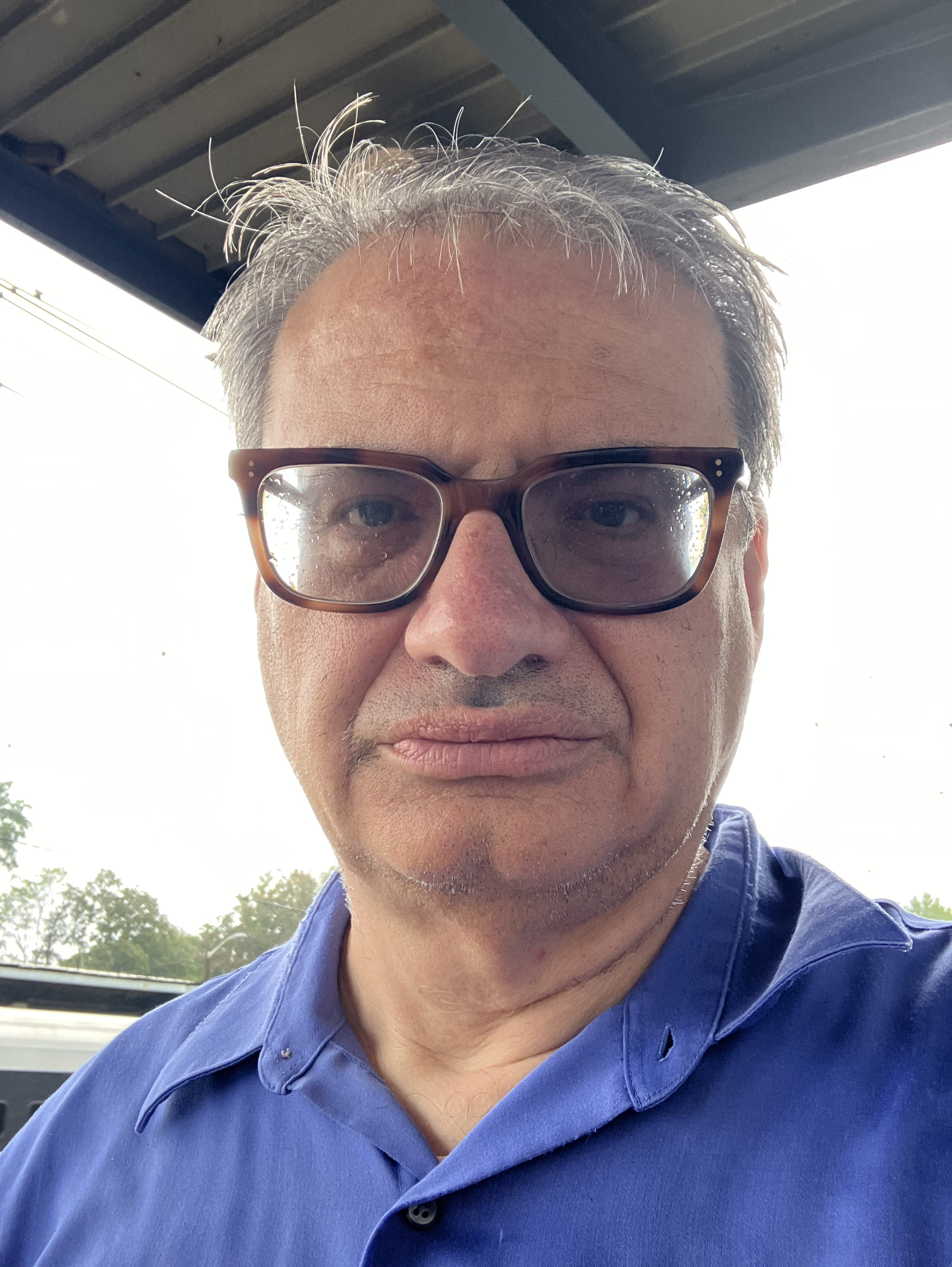
- Birns, seen here on September 25, 2023
- Born: May 30, 1965 (age 61)
- Known for: Tolkien research

Academic background
- Education: Columbia University (BA); New York University (PhD)

Academic work
- Discipline: Australian literature
- Institutions: The New School; College of New Rochelle; New York University

Nicholas Birns (born May 30, 1965) is a scholar of literature, including fantasy and Australian literature. As a Tolkien scholar he has written on a variety of topics including "The Scouring of the Shire" and Tolkien's biblical sources. His analysis of the writings of Anthony Powell and Roberto Bolaño has been admired by scholars.

== Biography ==
Nicholas Birns took his BA at Columbia University in 1988. He took his MA at New York University in 1990, and he completed his PhD in 1992, also at New York University.

Birns was a visiting professor at Western Connecticut State University from 1992 to 1993. He was a professor at the New School from 1995 to 2014. He joined Eugene Lang College in 2005, teaching many different courses in literature. He taught at the College of New Rochelle from 2012. He is an adjunct instructor at the New York University School of Professional Studies. and lectures on Scottish history at the St Andrew's Society of the State of New York. He is the editor of Antipodes: A Global Journal of Australian/NZ Literature and in 2024, was named a Corresponding Fellow by the Australian Academy of the Humanities. He is a noted Tolkien scholar, having written on topics including "The Scouring of the Shire", The Children of Hurin, the wizard Radagast, and Tolkien's biblical sources.

Birns was elected a Corresponding Fellow of the Australian Academy of the Humanities in 2024.

== Reception ==
The scholar of English literature Christine Berberich, reviewing Birns's Understanding Anthony Powell for Modernism/modernity, described it as "a labor of love" and "a laudable task" undertaken with a "thorough knowledge of the subject matter", though she regretted the lack of discussion of the "influence of fascism on the British upper classes" in the 1930s, and of the Holocaust, whereas the lesser-known Katyn massacre was covered in detail.

The scholar of Spanish and Latin American literature Eduardo Gonzalez wrote that Roberto Bolaño as World Literature was "the best Bolaño critical ensemble since Bolaño Salvaje (2006)" and had an "exemplary introduction".

The author and scholar of Australian literature Jean-Francois Vernay wrote of Birns's Contemporary Australian literature: A world not yet dead that it discussed the writings of Australian authors "within the wider international context, and in terms of the history of ideas". In his view, Birns "manages to think outside the box by applying tenets of neoliberalism to Australian literary studies and one learns much from this book, not least from its valuable discussions of the American reception of Australian fiction."

== Works ==
=== Books ===
- 2004: Understanding Anthony Powell, University of South Carolina Press.
- 2010: Theory After Theory: An Intellectual History of Literary Theory from 1950 to the Early Twenty-First Century, Broadview Press.
- 2013: Barbarian Memory: The Legacy of Early Medieval History in Early Modern Literature, Palgrave Macmillan.
- 2015: Contemporary Australian literature: A world not yet dead, Sydney University Press.
- 2017: Roberto Bolaño as World Literature, Bloomsbury Publishing.
- 2019: The Hyperlocal In Eighteenth and Nineteenth Century Literary Space, Rowman & Littlefield.
- 2021: Anthony Trollope: A Companion (with John F. Wirenius), McFarland & Company.
- 2024: The Literary Role of History in the Fiction of J. R. R. Tolkien, Routledge.
- 2026: Agatha Christie Under the Magnifying Glass: Close Readings of 12 Novels, McFarland & Company.

=== Edited collections ===
- 2007: Companion to Twentieth Century Australian Literature, with Rebecca McNeer, Camden House Publishing.
- 2010: Reading Across The Pacific: Australian-United States Intellectual Histories (with Robert Dixon), Sydney University Press.
- 2010: Mario Vargas Llosa and Latin American Politics (with Juan E. De Castro), Palgrave Macmillan.
- 2011: Willa Cather: Critical Insights, Salem Press.
- 2012: Cultural Encounters, Salem Press.
- 2013: The Contemporary Spanish American Novel (with Will Corral and Juan E. De Castro), Bloomsbury Publishing.
- 2017: Roberto Bolaño as World Literature (with Juan E. De Castro), Bloomsbury Publishing.
- 2017: Options for Teaching Australian and New Zealand Literature (with Nicole Moore and Sarah Shieff), Modern Language Association.
- 2023: The Cambridge Companion to the Australian Novel (with Louis Klee), Cambridge University Press.
