= Eucatastrophe =

Sudden turn of events averting disaster

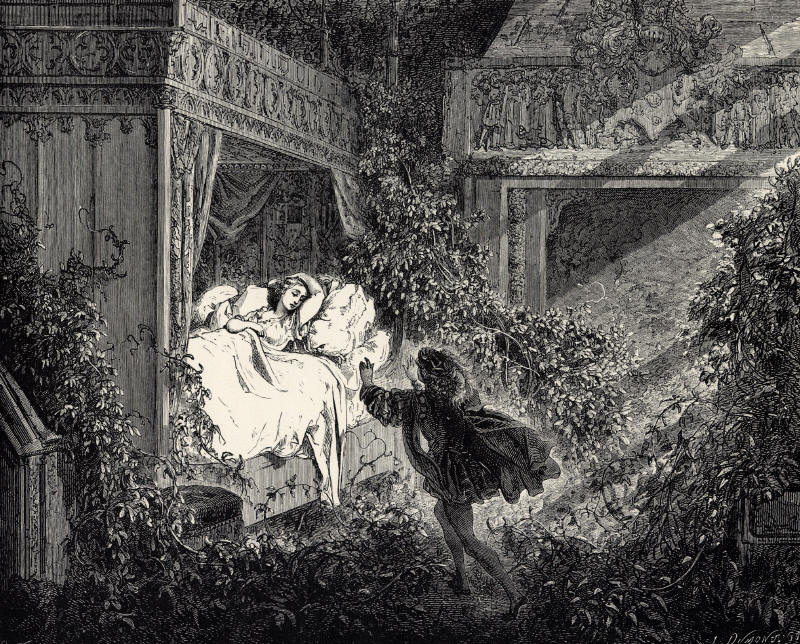
In a classic use of eucatastrophe, the prince arrives to break the spell that has kept Sleeping Beauty and her kingdom asleep for 100 years. 1897 illustration by Gustave Doré

A eucatastrophe is a sudden turn of events in a story that ensures the protagonist does not meet some terrible, impending doom. The concept was created by the philologist and fantasy author J. R. R. Tolkien in his essay "On Fairy-Stories", based on a 1939 lecture. The term has since been taken up by other authors, and by scholars.

== Origins ==
The philologist and fantasy author J. R. R. Tolkien coined the word by affixing the Greek prefix eu, meaning good, to catastrophe, the word traditionally used in classically inspired literary criticism to refer to the "unravelling" or conclusion of a drama's plot. For Tolkien, the term appears to have had a thematic meaning that went beyond its literal etymological meaning in terms of form. As he defines it in his essay "On Fairy-Stories", based on a lecture he gave in 1939, eucatastrophe is a fundamental part of his conception of mythopoeia. Though Tolkien's interest is in myth, it is connected to the gospel; Tolkien, a devout Catholic, calls the Incarnation of Christ the eucatastrophe of "human history" and the Resurrection the eucatastrophe of the Incarnation.

Eucatastrophe in fiction has been labelled by some as a form of deus ex machina, due to both sharing an impossible problem being suddenly resolved. However, differences between the two have been noted, such as eucatastrophe's inherent connection to an optimistic view on the unfolding of events in the narrative of the world. In Tolkien's view, eucatastrophe can occur without the use of a deus ex machina.

== Examples ==
The climax of The Lord of the Rings, as portrayed by Ted Nasmith

The best-known and most fully realized eucatastrophe in Tolkien's work occurs in the climax of The Lord of the Rings. Though victory seems assured for Sauron, the One Ring is permanently destroyed as a result of Gollum's waylaying of Frodo at Mount Doom.

Another example of eucatastrophe is the recurring role of the eagles as unexpected rescuers throughout Tolkien's writing. While their role has been described as that of a deus ex machina, Tolkien described Bilbo's "eucatastrophic emotion" at the eagles' appearance in The Hobbit as one of the key moments of the book.

Longtermists such as Owen Cotton-Barratt and Toby Ord have adopted the word to refer to any hypothetical future transition that would provide existential hope of not only averting human extinction, but also hope of an "efflorescence" of future abundance.

== See also ==
- Happy ending
- Peripeteia

== Sources ==
- Carpenter, Humphrey, ed. (2023) [1981]. The Letters of J. R. R. Tolkien: Revised and Expanded Edition. New York: HarperCollins. ISBN 978-0-35-865298-4.
- Mazur, Eric Michael, ed. (2011). Encyclopedia of Religion and Film. ABC-CLIO. ISBN 978-0313013980.
- Solopova, Elizabeth (2009). Languages, Myths and History: An Introduction to the Linguistic and Literary Background of J. R. R. Tolkien's Fiction. New York City: North Landing Books. ISBN 978-0-9816607-1-4.
- Tolkien, J. R. R. (1990). "On Fairy-Stories". The Monsters and the Critics, and Other Essays. London: HarperCollins. ISBN 0-261-10263-X.
