= Psychological journeys of Middle-earth =

Theme in Tolkien's fiction

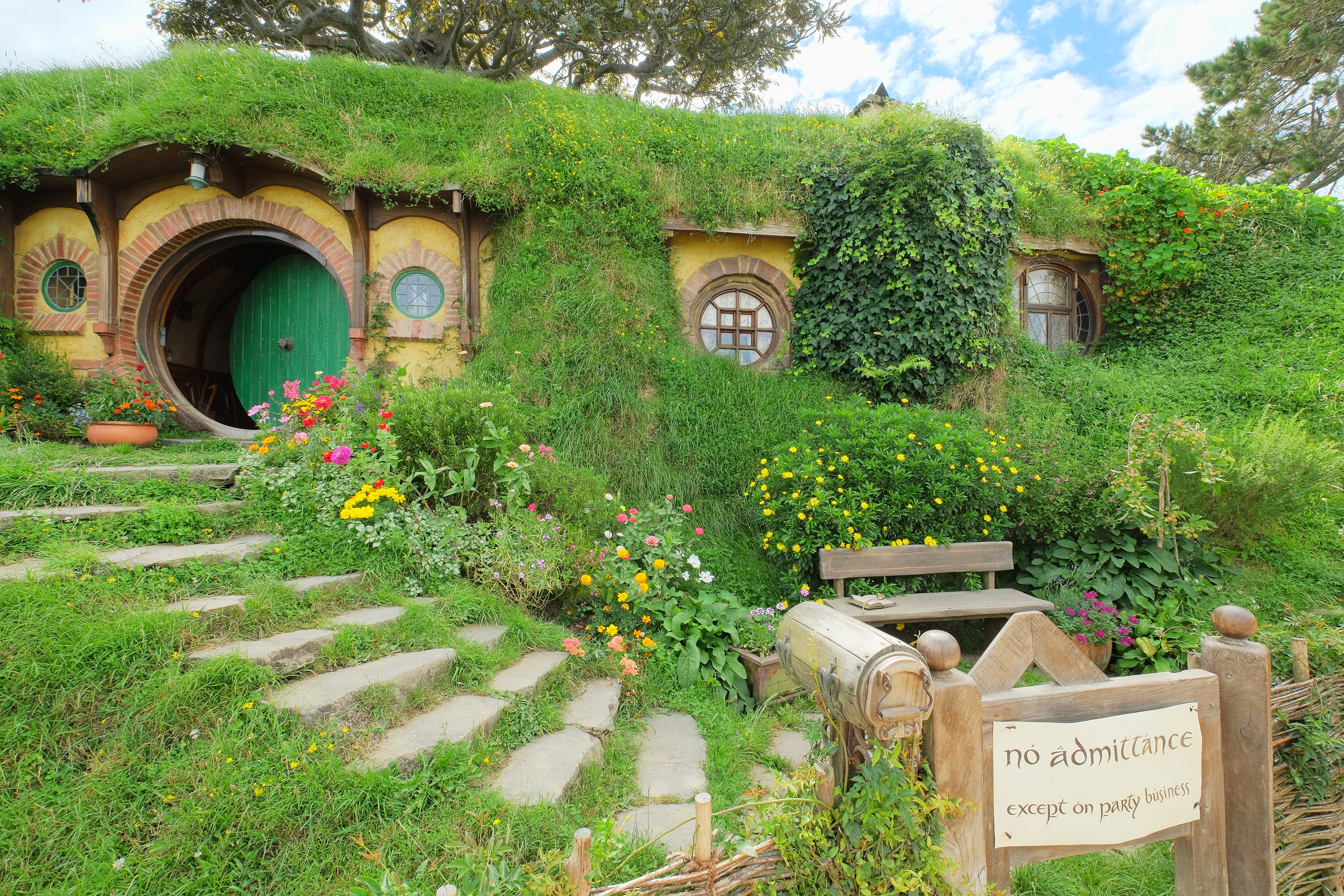
Both Bilbo and later Frodo Baggins leave Bag End, their comfortable home, setting off into the unknown on their journeys, and returning changed.

Scholars, including psychoanalysts, have commented that J. R. R. Tolkien's Middle-earth stories about both Bilbo Baggins, protagonist of The Hobbit, and Frodo Baggins, protagonist of The Lord of the Rings, constitute psychological journeys. Bilbo returns from his journey to help recover the Dwarves' treasure from Smaug the dragon's lair in the Lonely Mountain changed, but wiser and more experienced. Frodo returns from his journey to destroy the One Ring in the fires of Mount Doom scarred by multiple weapons, and is unable to settle back into the normal life of his home, the Shire.

Bilbo's journey has been seen as a Bildungsroman, a narrative of personal growth and coming-of-age, and in Jungian terms as a journey of individuation, developing the self. Frodo's journey has been interpreted both as such a Jungian development, and in terms of the psychoanalytic theories of Melanie Klein and Lev Vygotsky. Jungian interpretations have identified numerous figures who correspond to archetypes, such as Gandalf and Saruman as the Wise Old Man, Gollum as Frodo's shadow, and Denethor and Théoden as the Old King, while Gandalf, Elrond, Galadriel and Gollum have all been described as guide figures. Several features of The Lord of the Rings have been interpreted as Jungian mandalas, figures of the self; one such is the group of four Hobbits, who may collectively represent the ego with its four cognitive functions. In Klein's theory, Frodo oscillates between the paranoid-schizoid and depressive positions, striving to resolve internal conflicts. In Vygotsky's theory, the journey is towards death, which Tolkien acknowledged as the theme of his book.

== Context ==
=== Jungian psychology ===
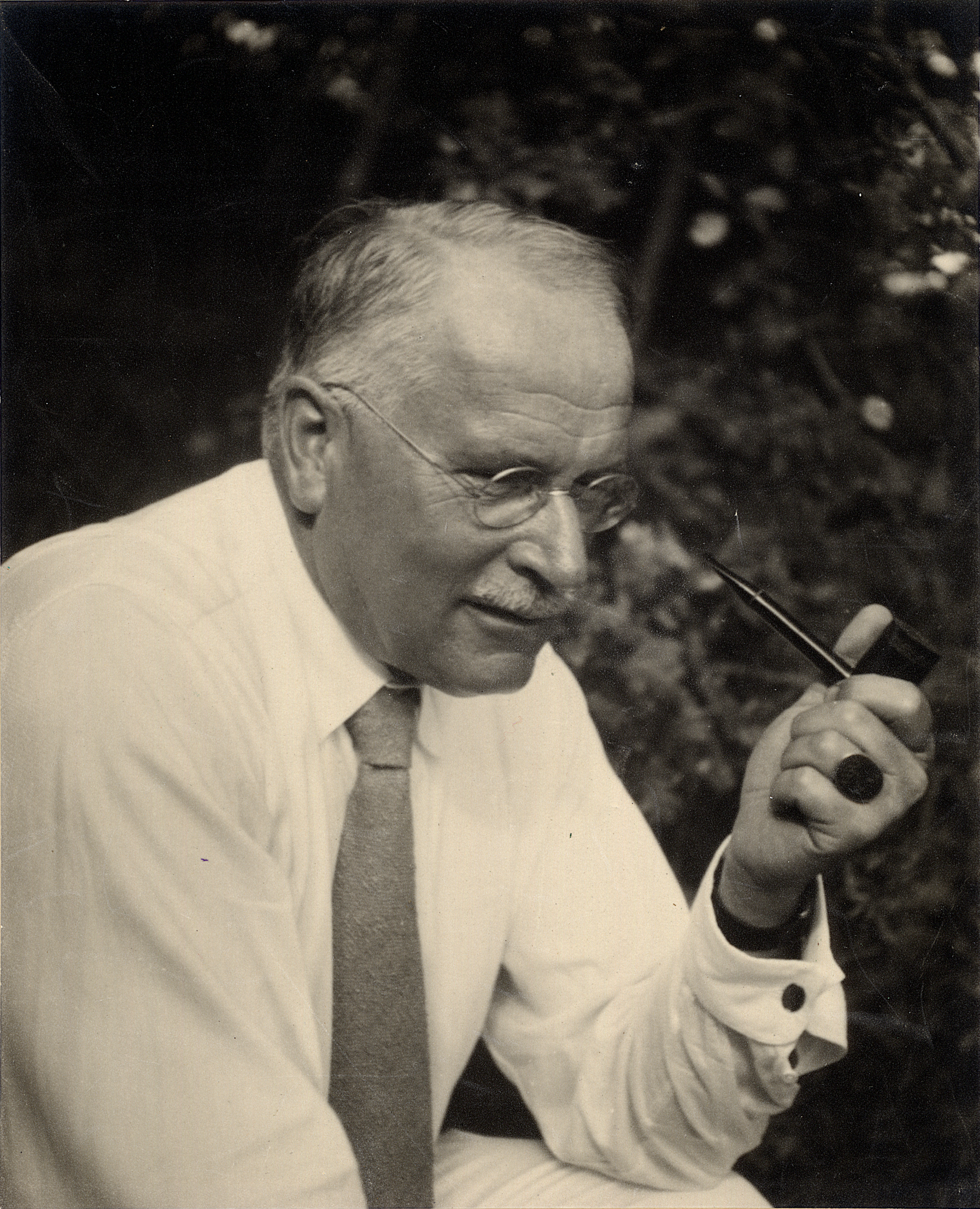
Carl Jung

Carl Jung (1875–1961), a Swiss psychiatrist, coined the term analytical psychology for his approach to the psyche, to distinguish it from Freud's psychoanalytic theories. Concepts specific to Jung's analytical psychology include the anima and animus, archetypes, the collective unconscious, complexes, extraversion and introversion, individuation, the Self, the shadow and synchronicity. The findings of Jungian analysis have been applied in areas of life including social and family relationships, dreams and nightmares, work–life balance, architecture and urban planning, and politics, economics, and conflict.

=== J. R. R. Tolkien and Jungian psychology ===
J. R. R. Tolkien (1892–1973) was an English Roman Catholic writer, poet, philologist, and academic, best known as the author of two high fantasy works set in Middle-earth, The Hobbit and The Lord of the Rings.

Tolkien was a member of The Inklings, a literary club that included his friend C. S. Lewis, who was interested in Jungian psychology, "enchanted" by the idea of the collective unconscious, and probably shared these ideas with Tolkien. The Tolkien scholar Verlyn Flieger states that Tolkien's The Lost Road, a story of time-travel by a father-son pair who reappear in different ages in the past, was based on Jungian psychology, in particular the collective unconscious, with a hint of reincarnation. Flieger states that Tolkien's mythology for England was "not simply ... about England ... but ... ingrained in the memory of countless generations of Englishmen, memory revived, reexperienced, and re-possessed ... through the genetic recollections of their ancestors." Flieger comments that in The Lost Road, Tolkien uses the "recognised psychological phenomenon" of sudden flashbacks "as a psychic gateway into locked-off areas of the soul", extending it from past experience to past lives. She states that this was wholly compatible with J. W. Dunne's theory in his 1927 An Experiment with Time which allowed the mind to "dream through time in any direction". The clinical psychologist Nancy Bunting writes in Mallorn that Tolkien expressed a Jungian view in several places, such as in a letter to Christopher Tolkien which in her words "sounds the Jungian refrain of linking native soil, race, and language".

=== Middle-earth narratives ===
==== The Hobbit ====
The Hobbit Bilbo Baggins, safe in his comfortable home, Bag End, is invited by the Wizard Gandalf and a party of Dwarves to help recover the Dwarves' treasure from Smaug the dragon's lair in the Lonely Mountain. On the way he faces dangers from a group of Trolls in a wood, goblins and the monster Gollum – from whom he acquires a magic ring – in the Misty Mountains, Wargs in Wilderland, giant spiders in Mirkwood, the imprisonment of the Dwarves by wood-Elves, and finally Smaug himself; and many of the opposing groups meet in the climactic Battle of the Five Armies. He returns from his journey changed, but wiser and more experienced.

==== The Lord of the Rings ====
Gandalf demonstrates to the Hobbit Frodo Baggins that Bilbo's magic ring is the dangerous One Ring. Frodo, terrified, bravely sets out of the Shire, heading for Bree, accompanied by his gardener, Sam Gamgee, and two other Hobbits, Merry Brandybuck and Pippin Took, both cousins of Frodo's. They are pursued by Black Riders. They escape into the Old Forest, where they are nearly trapped by Old Man Willow, but rescued by Tom Bombadil, master of the forest. They are captured and put under a spell by the barrow-wight; Frodo awakens from the spell and summons Tom Bombadil, who frees them a second time. Reaching Bree, Frodo puts on the Ring, causing shock in the inn there. The Black Riders raid the inn during the night, but the party escape, hidden by a Ranger, Strider. He leads them across the Wild to Rivendell. The Black Riders attack on top of Weathertop hill, wounding Frodo with a magical Morgul-knife. He starts to fade to invisibility. He reaches Rivendell deathly ill, but is healed by Elrond.

The Council of Elrond decides the Ring must be destroyed in the fires of Mount Doom. Frodo is chosen to bear the Ring; Elrond chooses eight companions to assist Frodo on the quest, forming the Fellowship of the Ring. They set off south, fail to cross the Misty Mountains in the face of a magical snowstorm, and cross beneath the mountains through the tunnels of Moria. At the entrance, Frodo is seized by the tentacles of the Watcher in the Water. Escaping into the tunnel through the magical Doors of Durin, the party is attacked by Orcs and then by a Balrog, an ancient fire-demon. Gandalf defends the party from the Balrog, but both he and it fall into a chasm and are killed. The others flee, and take refuge in the timeless Elven forest of Lothlórien, where they are counselled by the Lady Galadriel. After leaving that land, one of the party, Boromir, tries to take the Ring, but Frodo evades him using the Ring, and sets off for Mordor.

He and Sam are tracked and then led across the barren hills of the Emyn Muil and the Dead Marshes by Gollum, who is enslaved by the Ring. Failing to enter the Black Gate of Mordor, they travel to the pass of Cirith Ungol, guarded by the giant spider Shelob. Frodo uses the magical light of the Phial of Galadriel to drive Shelob back, and his sword Sting to cut through her web. Shelob ambushes and stings Frodo, and trusses him like a fly in a cobweb. Sam, thinking Frodo dead, takes the Phial, Sting, and the Ring.

Sam rescues Frodo and they cross the wasteland of Mordor. At the Cracks of Doom, Frodo claims the Ring for himself, but Gollum bites off Frodo's finger and takes the Ring. Gollum falls into the fire of Mount Doom and the Ring is destroyed. The surviving members of the Fellowship of the Ring return home, and while the others become heroes, Frodo is scarred by multiple weapons, and is unable to settle back into the normal life of the Shire.

== Jungian interpretations ==
=== The hero's journey ===
The evolution and maturation of the Hobbit protagonist, Bilbo Baggins, is central to The Hobbit. This journey, where Bilbo gains a clear sense of identity and confidence in the outside world, has been viewed as a Bildungsroman rather than a traditional quest. Dorothy Matthews writes in A Tolkien Compass that the Jungian concept of individuation, too, is reflected in this theme of growing maturity and capability, as Tolkien contrasts Bilbo's personal growth with the Dwarves' arrested development. Thus, while Gandalf exerts a parental influence over Bilbo early on, it is Bilbo who gradually takes over leadership of the party, a fact the dwarves could not bear to acknowledge. The hero's returning from the underworld, with a boon (such as the Ring, or an Elvish sword) that benefits his society is seen to fit Joseph Campbell's mythic archetypes of initiation and male coming-of-age. The Tolkien scholar Jared Lobdell comments that he is "profoundly unsympathetic" to Matthews's psychological approach, but that she "carries it off well". Lobdell explains, citing C. S. Lewis's essay "Psychoanalysis and Literary Criticism", that many different stories could, for instance, have the same Freudian interpretation, but be quite different as literature. He remarks on the other hand that a psychoanalytic approach is at least richer than a purely materialistic one.

The psychologist Timothy O'Neill comments that The Lord of the Rings has the same overall plot and point as The Hobbit, but is far richer in structure and symbol, something that in his view does not detract from either work. O'Neill cautions that Tolkien's narrative is "not intended as an explicit description of the process of self-realization." Instead, as fantasy, it is "a sort of prose dream" where the unconscious has room "to parade its symbols". Noting that Tolkien is rather more thorough than many other authors "does not weaken its impact on the reader". He warns that "The unconscious is not educated in analytical psychology—quite the reverse—and we must make do with ready imagery and organization". Therefore, he writes, one should not "search for archetypes under every stone, behind every tree". All the same, O'Neill comments, "Tolkien's world ... [and] Jung's theoretical framework ... are waters drawn ... from the same enchanted well." Whether for that reason or not, Jungian interpretations have been offered for many features of Middle-earth. For instance, the essayist Allison Harl writes that the Watcher in the Water in The Lord of the Rings represents a gatekeeper whose goal, in the context of the archetypal journey, is to keep the heroes from entering into new territory, psychologically or spiritually. This "guardian theory" has been echoed by writers such as Joseph Campbell and Bill Moyers. Among the Jungian archetypes (shown in "Quoted Title Case") identified by scholars in Tolkien's narratives are:

Some Jungian archetypes identified by scholars
Middle-earth	Dorothy Matthews, 1975	Timothy O'Neill, 1979	Pia Skogemann, 2009
Gandalf	"Wise Old Man"	Parts of "Hero", "Self", and "Wise Old Man" combined	spirit, "Wise Old Man" opposed by Saruman
Gollum	"Devouring Mother"	"image of the nightmare not-hobbit, the alter ego that lurks just out of sight"	Frodo's "Shadow", loss of meaning
The One Ring	"Circle of the Self"	"Circle of the Self", "the potential force that promises to make whole both hobbit and Middle-earth"	the dark part of the "Self"
Tom Bombadil	—————	"Original Man" or "Anthropos"; "Trickster" to the Hobbits of Buckland and the Marish; Primitive form of the "Self"	"Trickster"
Tom Bombadil and Goldberry	—————	A perfect whole, yin and yang	A paired image of the "Self", syzygy

=== Paired characters ===
Diagram of Patrick Grant's Jungian view of The Lord of the Rings with hero, anima and other archetypes; the hero is composed both of the noble Aragorn and the small home-loving Frodo.

Patrick Grant, a scholar of Renaissance literature, interpreted the interactions of Frodo with the other characters as fitting the oppositions and other pairwise relationships of Jungian archetypes, recurring psychological symbols proposed by Carl Jung. He stated that the Hero archetype appears in The Lord of the Rings both in noble and powerful form as the warrior-king Aragorn, and in childlike form as Frodo, whose quest can be interpreted as a personal journey of individuation. They are opposed by the Ringwraiths (the Black Riders). Frodo's anima is the Elf-queen Galadriel; the Hero is assisted by the Wise Old Man archetype in the shape of the Wizard Gandalf. Frodo's Shadow is the monstrous Gollum, appropriately in Grant's view, also a male Hobbit like Frodo. All of these, together with other characters in the book, create an image of the self.

The psychologist Charles Nelson, analysing the guide figures in The Lord of the Rings, similarly describes Gandalf as the good and Gollum as the evil guide, noting that both are necessary to the quest. He observes that Thorin actually describes Gandalf as their "counsellor" at the start of The Hobbit. As for Gollum, he says in The Two Towers "Nice hobbits! We will come with them. Find them safe paths in the dark, yes we will." Nelson comments that Gollum accidentally served as guide to Bilbo in The Hobbit, leading him out of the caves under the Misty Mountains "out of ignorance". A third guide figure, Elrond, provides wise guidance both to Bilbo and to Frodo; indeed, he advises Gandalf too, and in The Council of Elrond, he advises the representatives of all the Free Peoples. Other guides along the way include Tom Bombadil and Faramir; Nelson identifies the Elf-queen Galadriel as possibly the most powerful of the Fellowship's guide figures.

=== Multiple paths, multiple heroes ===
Robin Robertson, a Jungian clinical psychologist, sets out seven separate "paths of the hero" to describe the process of individuation in The Lord of the Rings. These are the paths of curiosity, for the young Hobbits Merry and Pippin; of opposites, for the Dwarf Gimli and the Elf Legolas; of the wizard, for Gandalf; of the king, for Aragorn; of failed individuation, for the monster Gollum; of love, for Sam; and of transcendence, for Frodo. Robertson comments that "Frodo's path transcends that of any other hero in literature." He adds that while Frodo seems to be the least of characters, "always aware of his own fears, his own limitations", he manages to achieve more than any of the great or wise. This accomplishment is balanced by the bitter ending, since Frodo is the one character unable to find peace after the quest, because he cannot be made whole. Robertson likens Frodo to Shakespeare's Prince Hamlet who cannot find peace on Earth.

The Tolkien scholar Verlyn Flieger compares and contrasts the journeys of Frodo and Aragorn, showing that while Frodo sets out as the little man of fairytale, it is Aragorn who gets the happy ending, while Frodo gets "defeat and disillusionment—the stark, bitter ending typical of [the heroes of] the Iliad, Beowulf, the Morte D'Arthur".

Anna Caughey, in A Companion to J. R. R. Tolkien, notes that in 1961 the poet W. H. Auden called The Lord of the Rings a quest-narrative, and argued that fantasy's purpose is to provide a framework for thinking about the worst of human experiences. In Caughey's view, Auden thus anticipated later "psychoanalytical deconstruction of European fairy-tales". She comments that Tolkien provides not a single quest-narrative but several, at different levels. These include Aragorn's quest for kingship, and Merry, Pippin, and Sam's quests for maturity and social identity. Looking at the quests from another perspective, she describes Frodo as the broken hero; Aragorn and Sam as following patriarch's quests, both becoming leaders of their respective realms; and Merry and Pippin, like Bilbo in The Hobbit, following simple "There and Back Again" quests. Caughey adds that while Tolkien denied writing an allegory, one of the reasons that the book was so popular was that readers liked "engaging with the universal human experiences of failure, sacrifice, redemption and growth to maturity" of a hero's journey.

Anna Caughey's analysis of the Middle-earth quests
Quest \ Hero	Frodo	Aragorn	Sam	Merry	Pippin	Bilbo
Purpose	Destroy Ring	Kingship	Maturity and social identity			
Result	Ring destroyed Frodo traumatised	King of Gondor; Marries Arwen	Mayor of the Shire; Marries Rosie	Thain of the Shire	Master of Buckland	Returns home rich
Summary	Broken Hero	Patriarch's quests		'There and Back Again' quests		

=== Collective individuation ===
The Jungian analyst and author Pia Skogemann sets out her own Jungian interpretation, with Frodo as hero and Gandalf as an inner guide. She writes that she sees the quest "as a collective individuation, a confrontation with the collective unconscious and its archetypes. The ego in the shape of the four hobbits has become transformed and expanded through this confrontation." She states, too, that Frodo repeatedly falls into "a trance or unconsciousness in the confrontation with archetypal figures", including when he is stung by Shelob. Skogemann interprets numerous characters and events in The Lord of the Rings in Jungian terms. For example, she describes the scene where Frodo looks into the Mirror of Galadriel and sees the Eye of Sauron: "Galadriel pulls Frodo back from his trancelike state". Galadriel's role as guide is made more explicit when she later gives Frodo a phial containing the light of Earendil's star, to guide him when all other light fails. Among the many Jungian themes that Skogemann identifies are:

A sample of Pia Skogemann's analysis of psychological themes in The Lord of the Rings
The Lord of the Rings	Psychological interpretation
Setting sun shines on Aragorn's coronation; Arwen is evening star	Surface meaning: Aragorn is blessed by the Valar, in the West; underlying meaning: ending and death, part of a fully-realised life (pp. 100–101)
Gandalf strives against Sauron's attempt to get Frodo to put on the Ring	Frodo "in a dreamlike, visionary state" feels this as an inner conflict; corresponds to dreams with the self as voice of authority. Good and evil, both inner and outer. (Note: Skogemann notes Tom Shippey's analysis of the applicability of the Boethian/Manichean conflict in Christianity to Middle-earth, commenting that Tolkien is always ambiguous about whether evil is just the absence of good, or an actual force. The Ring can be seen as an external thing carrying Sauron's evil will, or an inner force amplifying the negative in the psyche.) (p. 155)
Aragorn dressed in green cloak; Aragorn becoming King; Aragorn as Elessar, the green elfstone, almost divine (Note: The Hobbits take their leave of the King: "Then Aragorn took the green stone and held it up, and there came a green fire from his hand.")	The Green Man, "bringer of hope and healing"; the conscious Ego firmly related to the Self, with creative access to archetypal world; the Self personified. (pp. 191–192)
"The Scouring of the Shire"	Not adapting "to one's inner and outer circumstances ... until a crisis ... forces one to change one's life completely."(p. 194)

=== Mandalas of the self ===
Jung observed that people in multiple religions and cultures, including himself, made use of drawings of a circle motif; he described these as mandalas. He hypothesized that these reflected the mind's inner state at the moment of creation, and were a kind of symbolic archetype in the universal subconscious, writing that "I sketched every morning in a notebook a small circular drawing, [...] which seemed to correspond to my inner situation at the time. [...] Only gradually did I discover what the mandala really is: [...] the Self, the wholeness of the personality, which if all goes well is harmonious."

Pia Skogemann's interpretation of elements of The Lord of the Rings as Jungian mandalas of the Self

The Four Hobbits as a mandala
of the four cognitive functions of the Self

Gandalf's fight with the Balrog as a mandala
of the four classical elements

Skogemann identifies the capital of Lothlórien, Caras Galadhon, as a Jungian mandala, describing it as a place of self-knowledge. She further proposes that a 4-fold structure is important throughout The Lord of the Rings. She adduces as evidence the mandala-structure of Minas Tirith, the 4 rivers, the 4 forests, the 4 Hobbits of the Fellowship, the 4 other members of the Fellowship (less Boromir, who dies), and finally the 4th Age. The 4 Hobbits, namely Frodo, Pippin, Merry, and Sam stand for Jung's 4 psychological (or cognitive) functions: Thinking; Intuition; Sensation; and Feeling. Crossing the 4 rivers (Brandywine, Bruinen, Celebrant, and Anduin) symbolises the choice of destiny in the journey towards individuation, while crossing the 4 forests (the Old Forest, the Trollshaws, the Golden Wood, and Fangorn) represents visiting energetic centres in the collective unconscious. She notes Gandalf's battle with the Balrog using fire, then in deep water, then on stone, then high in mountains, describing these as the 4 classical elements, fire, water, earth, and air. She interprets the One Ring and the Three Elven-Rings as forming a 4-fold mandala of the collective self. (Note: Skogemann writes that the claim by Timothy O'Neill that the One Ring is the Self and wholeness is wrong, as the opposite is the case: Frodo doesn't regain wholeness, and Middle-earth is saved by the Ring's destruction.) She interprets the 4-fold structure as the archetype of the Anthropos, the Whole Man. In that scheme, the 4 Hobbits stand for the Ego archetype, while Legolas and Gimli represent the transcending of the old hostility of Dwarf and Elf (subterranean vs ethereal). The 4th Age is, she notes, called the age of Man, as Elf, Dwarf, Orc and the rest fade or depart, leaving Middle-earth to Man alone.

== Kleinian and Vygotskyian interpretations ==
The psychoanalyst Paula Jean Manners applies the theory of Melanie Klein, an Austrian-British psychotherapist, to Frodo's case. She notes that both Tolkien and Klein's husband returned changed from the horrors of the First World War. She likens Tolkien's stated theme of The Lord of the Rings as death to the Russian psychoanalyst Lev Vygotsky's view, that "to develop is to die". Manners states that in Kleinian terms, "development is seen as striving towards resolution of conflicting states, particularly the oscillation between paranoid-schizoid and depressive positions." Further, she writes, Klein described the child's anxiety between the "good breast" and the "bad breast", feeding the child and then leaving the child. Manners suggests that the good breast is the Shire, the safe home, while the bad is whatever is outside the Shire's borders. The world is thus split into good and bad, "the paranoid-schizoid position". But Frodo is aware that evil will come into the Shire if he stays, so he sets off on his journey. She likens that to the setting off to war of the young men (including Tolkien) to keep England safe from the enemy. The other side of Klein's theory, the depressive position, appears when Frodo falls into self-pity, and becomes depressed. On the other hand, Manners writes, when Frodo genuinely feels pity for Gollum, Frodo ceases to be split: "he assimilat[es] the good and bad objects internally." She describes this as "essentially a maturing and loss of innocence", calling that a challenging developmental process, and notes that the therapist has to hold together the two halves of their client, the "villain" Gollum and the "victim" Sméagol (Gollum's better side).

== Validity ==
Scholars have evaluated the validity of a psychological approach to Tolkien. Some reject it altogether: the biographer and literary theorist Joanny Moulin comments that Tolkien's "determined resistance" to allegory makes "theories of the fairy-tale which bear heavily on psychology or psychoanalysis ... of no avail for Tolkien, because these are inherently allegorical modes of interpretation." Others are more open to its possibilities: the Tolkien scholar Thomas Honegger records that Tolkien mentioned Jung in his notes for his essay "On Fairy-Stories", and that other members of The Inklings, an Oxford discussion group, especially Owen Barfield and C. S. Lewis, were familiar with Jung's writings. He comments that while Skogemann's book introduces key Jungian terms like archetype and archetypal image, she does not work within the framework of Jungian studies; nor does she use many Tolkien studies. As a result, in his view, Skogemann identifies instances of archetypal images in The Lord of the Rings, but does little to interpret them, producing a "rather mechanistic" application of a "Jungian grid" to Tolkien's text.

Edith L. Crowe, in Mythlore, writes that Jungian interpretation had been fashionable among literary scholars, but as Gergely Nagy had written, it had come to be seen as a "mystical ... paradigm" which was "hopelessly dated". All the same, Crowe states, the way fiction illustrates Jungian archetypes remains "irresistibly fascinating". She notes that Skogemann was correct, if "dismissive", to say of O'Neill that he was untrained in Jungian analytical psychology, but that she omits to mention that he was a psychology professor (in another field). Crowe writes that Skogemann, an experienced Jungian analyst and co-founder of Copenhagen's Jung Institute, might have been expected to provide a much richer analysis of Tolkien than O'Neill, but disappointingly spent some 80-90% of her text quoting or paraphrasing Tolkien. She notes that Tom Shippey is the only Tolkien scholar that Skogemann cites frequently, and that she shares his view that Tolkien's writings reflect the 20th century's collective unconscious. Crowe calls the identification of the "thoroughly evil" Ring with the Self a "serious misstep in O'Neill's otherwise enjoyable and readable book". She states that Skogemann's account of the One Ring and the Three Elven-rings is "a useful correction to this", adding that Skogemann "relates the three Elven rings plus the One Ring to Jung's 'analysis of the Christian age in the light of alchemical symbolism, with the Good Trinity and Satan or the Antichrist as the hidden fourth'." On the other hand, she adds that Skogemann's failure to consider Jungian analysis of Tolkien by other authors in journal articles and dissertations, "even to refute it", is "a significant weakness".

Skogemann's 'alchemical' interpretation of her own reading of some elements from Tolkien

Skogemann's reading of the 4 Rings as a mandala of the self, with the 4 classical elements, related to Jung's "alchemical" analysis of the Christian age. Sauron is linked to Satan, while the 3 bearers of the Elven Rings are linked to the Trinity.

Honegger states that O'Neill's 1979 The Individuated Hobbit clearly and succinctly introduces theories of mind and situates Jung's work among them. O'Neill then outlines Jung's framework and defines the key terms that Jung uses, including archetype, anima, shadow, collective unconscious, and individuation, where (he writes) Skogemann relies on web links. Further, the book analyses The Lord of the Rings in The Silmarillion's framework of myth, thereby reaching effectively (in Honegger's view) into the "archetypal dimension".

Timothy O'Neill's interpretation of a poem in The Lord of the Rings
Tolkien's "The Riddle of Strider"	"In plain language what the unconscious is trying to say"	"In the language of the analytical psychologist"
Seek for the Sword that was broken: In Imladris it dwells; There shall be counsels taken Stronger than Morgul-spells. There shall be shown a token That Doom is near at hand, For Isildur's Bane shall waken, And the Halfling forth shall stand.	"Seek the forgotten link with the past, the symbol of the reborn House of Elendil; for only then shall Gondor be made whole. It is to be found in the house of Elrond the Half-elven, brother of the founder of the line of Kings of Númenor. In what you will find there is the key to the danger that threatens you, the terror out of the Mountains of Shadow. There, too, you will see that the final resolution is near, for the token of Man reunited will be seen, and you would never believe me if I told you in whose hand it will lie!"	"The cure for the anxiety you feel, the pain of your one-sidedness, is in Self-realization. Your ego-tactic of ignoring your unconscious underpinnings has served only to make them seem more alarming. Turn and face the darkness, the 'spectre of the Brocken'; help is at hand, for at the end of that battle the Self will emerge and the psyche will be reunited."

Dorothy Matthews's 1975 "The Psychological Journey of Bilbo Baggins", one of the first studies of Tolkien and Jung, in Honegger's view helpfully interprets some features of the story, such as seeing Bilbo's Mirkwood spiders "as psychic fixations that have to be resisted", or arguing that Tolkien does not have Bilbo kill Smaug the dragon, because Tolkien did not want to position him as an epic hero, but rather to leave him as "Everyman". Matthews shows, Honegger writes, that a Jungian approach can offer new insights and highlight archetypal motifs found both in Middle-earth and in folklore or fairytales. But against this, in his view, she falls into the trap of "uncritical[ly]" identifying a string "of archetypal images and motifs": Gandalf embodies Jung's Wise Old Man, or "debatably", Gollum as the nightmarish Devouring Mother. Like other critics, Honegger argues, Matthews appears to believe that identifying archetypal images is an end in itself, though the question it answers, perhaps why the book has such an emotional impact, remains unstated. He notes that "emotional involvement and its explanation do not constitute legitimate literary criticism," even though Tolkien's power is not explainable by literary features like style or plot structure. He concludes that Jungian approaches to Tolkien need to go further than just arguing that "a halfling ... with some helper-figures, became a wiser and more individuated hobbit", no matter how true that is.

== Sources ==
- Campbell, Joseph; Moyers, Bill (2001). Joseph Campbell and the Power of Myth DVD. Mystic Fire Video/Wellspring.
- Carpenter, Humphrey (1978) [1977]. J. R. R. Tolkien: A Biography. Unwin Paperbacks. ISBN 978-0-04928-039-7.
- Caughey, Anna (2020) [2014]. "The Hero's Journey". In Lee, Stuart D. (ed.). A Companion to J. R. R. Tolkien. Wiley Blackwell. pp. 404–417. ISBN 978-1119656029. OCLC 1183854105.
- Flieger, Verlyn (2004). "Frodo and Aragorn: The Concept of the Hero". In Zimbardo, Rose A.; Isaacs, Neil D. (eds.). Understanding the Lord of the Rings: The Best of Tolkien Criticism. Houghton Mifflin. pp. 122–145. ISBN 978-0-618-42251-7.
- Grant, Patrick (1973). "Tolkien: Archetype and Word". Cross Currents (Winter 1973): 365–380. Archived from the original on 3 December 2021.
- Grenby, Matthew (2008). Children's Literature. Edinburgh University Press. ISBN 978-0-618-47885-9.
- Harl, Allison (2007). "The monstrosity of the gaze: critical problems with a film adaptation of The Lord of the Rings". Mythlore. 25 (3). article 7.
- Helms, Randel (1976). Myth, Magic and Meaning in Tolkien's World. Granada. pp. 45–55. ISBN 978-0-415-92150-3.
- Honegger, Thomas (2012). "More Light than Shadow? Jungian Approaches to Tolkien and the Archetypeal Image of the Shadow". Essais.
- Lobdell, Jared (1975). "Introduction". In Lobdell, Jared (ed.). A Tolkien Compass. Open Court. ISBN 978-0875483030.
- Manners, Paula Jean (18 September 2014) [2006]. "Frodo's journey". British Psychological Society.
- Matthews, Dorothy (1975). "The Psychological Journey of Bilbo Baggins". In Lobdell, Jared (ed.). A Tolkien Compass. Open Court Publishing. pp. 27–40. ISBN 978-0-87548-303-0.
- Nelson, Charles W. (2002). "From Gollum to Gandalf: The Guide Figures in J. R. R. Tolkien's "Lord of the Rings"". Journal of the Fantastic in the Arts. 13 (1): 47–61. JSTOR 43308562.
- O'Neill, Timothy R. (1979). The Individuated Hobbit: Jung, Tolkien, and the Archetypes of Middle-Earth. Houghton Mifflin. ISBN 0-395-28208-X. OCLC 5007475.
- Purtill, Richard L. (2003). J. R. R. Tolkien: Myth, Morality, and Religion. Ignatius Press. pp. 67–68. ISBN 978-0-89870-948-3.
- Robertson, Robin (30 May 2007). "Seven Paths of the Hero in Lord of the Rings: Introduction". Psychological Perspectives. 50 (1): 79–94. doi:10.1080/00332920701319491. S2CID 143849565.
- Robertson, Robin (8 September 2009). "Seven Paths of the Hero in Lord of the Rings: The Path of Transcendence". Psychological Perspectives. 52 (3): 351–371. doi:10.1080/00332920903099008. S2CID 170269190.
- Shippey, Tom (2005) [1982]. The Road to Middle-Earth: How J. R. R. Tolkien Created a New Mythology (Third ed.). HarperCollins. ISBN 978-0-261-10275-0.
- Skogemann, Pia (2009). Where the Shadows Lie: a Jungian Interpretation of Tolkien's The Lord of the Rings. Chiron Publications. ISBN 978-1-888602-45-6. OCLC 318641399., translated from the Danish En Jungiansk Fortolkning af Tolkiens Ringenes Herre (Forlaget Athene, 2004).
- Tolkien, J. R. R. (1937). Douglas A. Anderson (ed.). The Annotated Hobbit. Boston: Houghton Mifflin (published 2002). ISBN 978-0-618-13470-0.
- Tolkien, J. R. R. (1954a). The Fellowship of the Ring. The Lord of the Rings. Boston: Houghton Mifflin. OCLC 9552942.
- Tolkien, J. R. R. (1954). The Two Towers. The Lord of the Rings. Boston: Houghton Mifflin. OCLC 1042159111.
- Tolkien, J. R. R. (1955). The Return of the King. The Lord of the Rings. Boston: Houghton Mifflin. OCLC 519647821.
- Tolkien, J. R. R. (1977). Christopher Tolkien (ed.). The Silmarillion. Boston: Houghton Mifflin. ISBN 978-0-395-25730-2.
