= Understanding The Lord of the Rings =

Anthology of literary criticism of Tolkien

Understanding the Lord of the Rings
- Cover of the 2004 collection, which contained selections from both the earlier collections.
- Author: Rose Zimbardo and Neil D. Isaacs
- Subject: J. R. R. Tolkien's Middle-earth writings
- Genre: Literary criticism
- Publisher: Houghton Mifflin
- Publication date: 2004
- Media type: Paperback
- ISBN: 978-0-618-42253-1

Understanding The Lord of the Rings is a collection of scholarly essays on J. R. R. Tolkien's Middle-earth writings, mainly concerning his fantasy novel The Lord of the Rings. It was edited by Rose Zimbardo and Neil D. Isaacs, and published in 2004. Apart from two new essays, it consisted of a selection of essays from two earlier collections by the same editors: their 1968 Tolkien and the Critics, and their 1981 Tolkien: New Critical Perspectives.

The collections have been welcomed by scholars, who have commented that the 1968 book in particular was "a milestone" in Tolkien scholarship. The 1981 book was described as a good overview of Tolkien scholarship, while the 2004 book was called a "splendid anthology". The Journal of Tolkien Research wrote that the 1968 and 2004 collections both had an importance "beyond doubt" in the history of Tolkien studies.

== Context ==
J. R. R. Tolkien (1892–1973) was an English Roman Catholic writer, poet, philologist, and academic, best known as the author of the high fantasy works The Hobbit (1937) and The Lord of the Rings (1954–55). In 1957, The Lord of the Rings was awarded the International Fantasy Award. The publication of the Ace Books and Ballantine paperbacks in the United States helped it to become immensely popular with a new generation in the 1960s.

== Publication history ==
Rose A. Zimbardo and Neil D. Isaacs have edited three related collections of scholarly essays on The Lord of the Rings:

- 1968: Tolkien and the Critics. Cover illustration by Rainey Bennett. University of Notre Dame Press, ISBN 978-0-268-00279-4.
- 1981: Tolkien: New Critical Perspectives. University Press of Kentucky, ISBN 978-0-813-11408-8.
- 2004: Understanding the Lord of the Rings, Houghton Mifflin, ISBN 978-0-618-42253-1. Jacket design by Martha Kennedy, using detail of Figures and Foliage by Charles Rennie Mackintosh

== Contents ==
The three books, which are not illustrated, contain the following essays.

Contents across the three Isaacs & Zimbardo titles
Author	Title	1968	1981	2004	First published (when earlier)	Notes
Neil D. Isaacs	Introduction	yes	yes	yes		Overview, different in each volume
C. S. Lewis	"The Dethronement of Power"	yes	-	yes	Time and Tide 1955	Argues that far from being a book of good heroes and evil villains, The Lord of the Rings is full of moral subtlety and realism.
Edmund Fuller	"The Lord of the Hobbits: J.R.R. Tolkien"	yes	-	yes	Lord of the Hobbits 1961	Examines the book as a work of sub-creation which rehabilitates fantasy, or as Tolkien called it "fairy-story".
W. H. Auden	"The Quest Hero"	yes		yes	Texas Quarterly 1961	Unlike literary figures at the time, praises the book as a quest narrative with a quest hero and a conflict between good and evil, noting it is not set in a dream-world but in an imaginary world, a demanding task for an author to make it believable.
Hugh T. Keenan	"The Appeal of The Lord of the Rings: A Struggle for Life"	yes	-	-		Considers why the book is so attractive, including to "sober critics", who find that the work is "amazingly alive", and suggests that the central theme in the book is of life and death.
Patricia Meyer Spacks	"Power and Meaning in The Lord of the Rings"	yes	-	yes	Critique 1959	Contrasts Tolkien with two fellow Inklings, C. S. Lewis and Charles Williams, arguing that unlike their Christian fables, The Lord of the Rings has a pagan Anglo-Saxon ethos.
Rose A. Zimbardo	"Moral Vision in The Lord of the Rings"	yes	yes	yes		Analyses the book as a medieval-style romance. The beautiful thing that men do is heroic action; dwarves, making precious objects; elves, singing. Each has a moral choice, to give up their own needs for the good of all.
Marion Zimmer Bradley	"Men, Halflings, and Hero-Worship"	yes	-	yes		Explores Tolkien's depiction of hero worship, especially of the hero Aragorn, by the other members of the Fellowship, as well as by Éomer of Rohan and Faramir of Gondor. Bradley examines, too, the "strong love", eventually becoming classical "idealized friendship" of Frodo and Sam.
R. J. Reilly	"Tolkien and the Fairy Story"	yes	-	yes	Thought 1963	Discusses The Lord of the Rings as Tolkien's attempt to restore the heroic to modern fiction, as an essential element of fantasy (in Tolkien's terms, fairy-story), and argues that Tolkien did this in the frame of Christianity.
Thomas J. Gasque	"Tolkien: The Monsters and the Critters"	yes	-	-		Argues that Tolkien drew on northern mythology for a variety of monsters and races such as Dwarves, Elves, and Orcs, to provide interest.
John Tinkler	"Old English in Rohan"	yes	-	-		On Tolkien's use of Old English (Anglo-Saxon) for the Riders of Rohan, such as Théoden (meaning "King") or Éowyn (meaning "Delight in horses"), and so on for placenames and even a few phrases.
Mary Quella Kelly	"The Poetry of Fantasy: Verse in The Lord of the Rings"	yes	-	-		Discusses the importance of Tolkien's poetry in The Lord of the Rings, being both a pleasure in their own right, and supporting and enlarging on the prose, and so helping to sustain what Tolkien called "Secondary Belief". The verses range from simple Hobbit poetry to the cheerful singing of Tom Bombadil and the musical Elvish poems full of metrical and other devices.
Charles Moorman	"The Shire, Mordor, and Minas Tirith"	yes	-	-		Argues that the single most powerful influence on Tolkien is Norse mythology and saga, including monsters, battles, and landscapes.
Burton Raffel	"The Lord of the Rings as Literature"	yes	-	-		Suggests that while The Lord of the Rings is great storytelling, it is not literature. Raffel criticizes the style, the poetry, the characterization, the "manipulatory" use of incident, and the Christian morality.
Roger Sale	"Tolkien and Frodo Baggins"	yes	-	-		Proposes that the Hobbit Frodo Baggins is the real hero of the book, behaving "like any modern alienated man" amongst all the heroes, "but who also is Tolkien's affirmation of possibility".
J. S. Ryan	"Folktale, Fairy Tale, and the Creation of a Story"	-	yes	yes		Discusses what Tolkien means by myth, fairy-tale, and sub-creation, with reference to "Beowulf: The Monsters and the Critics", "On Fairy-Stories", and "Leaf by Niggle".
Verlyn Flieger	"Frodo and Aragorn: The Concept of the Hero"	-	yes	yes		Describes heroism in The Lord of the Rings, Frodo the disappointed small guy, Aragorn the man born to be King.
Paul H. Kocher	"Middle-earth: An Imaginary World?"	-	yes	yes	Master of Middle-Earth 1972	Discusses how Tolkien makes Middle-earth so believable, by combining the familiar with the fantastic, by framing the story as if he had discovered ancient manuscripts, by inventing a geography of Middle-earth, and by making use of Celtic and Norse mythology. The result is to place Middle-earth as the Earth as it might have been in the distant past.
Daniel Hughes	"Pieties and Giant Forms in The Lord of the Rings"	-	yes	-	Shadows of Imagination 1969	Seeks to describe the larger motifs in the book, such as the epic narrative of Strider revealed as Aragorn, the man born to be King of Gondor and Arnor.
Patrick Grant	"Tolkien: Archetype and Word"	-	yes	yes	CrossCurrents 1973	Looks at The Lord of the Rings from the point of view of Jungian archetypes and the psychological journey towards individuation. Grant accepts that this does not cover the Christian aspect of the book.
Lionel Basney	"Myth, History, and Time in The Lord of the Rings"	-	yes	yes		Argues that Tolkien presents a complete and coherent secondary world, fitting in to structures of myth and history.
David L. Jeffrey	"Recovery: Name in The Lord of the Rings"	-	yes	-		Explores Tolkien's use of languages to create the many names in The Lord of the Rings.
Henry B. Parks	"Critical Approach to Story"	-	yes	-		Analyses Tolkien's narrative approach, arguing that he is seeking to make the narrator's voice stronger, so as to make the secondary world more believable.
Lois K. Kuznets	"Tolkien and the Rhetoric of Childhood"	-	yes	-		Describes Bilbo Baggins's quest in The Hobbit as fitting the pattern of fiction for children, with an omniscient narrator, characters that children can identify with, a story that moves forwards in time, and a geography with separate safe and dangerous places.
Joseph McLellan	"Frodo and the Cosmos: Reflections on The Silmarillion"	-	yes	-	The Washington Post	Likens The Silmarillion to classics of ancient Greek and English literature.
Robert M. Adams	"The Hobbit Habit"	-	yes	-	The New York Review of Books	Attacks The Silmarillion as empty nonsense, nothing like The Lord of the Rings.
Jane Chance	"The Lord of the Rings: Tolkien's Epic"	-	-	yes	Tolkien's Art: 'A Mythology for England' 2001	Analyses The Lord of the Rings as a contrast between two medieval epic traditions, Christian and heroic Germanic.
Tom Shippey	"Another Road to Middle-earth: Jackson's Movie Trilogy"	-	-	yes		Explores Peter Jackson's transformation of the book to film, showing how he connects the characters' individual choices to universal themes, as Tolkien does, using quite different media and techniques.

== Reception ==
=== 1968 collection ===
Cover of the "milestone" first collection, Tolkien and the Critics, 1968. It included essays by W. H. Auden and C. S. Lewis.

In Journal of Tolkien Research, Mariana Rios Maldonado wrote of the 1968 and 2004 compilations that "the importance of both collections to the history of Tolkien studies is beyond doubt".

Richard C. West, in The J. R. R. Tolkien Encyclopedia, commented that "much of the best scholarly work being done during this period [the 1960s] was not in single books but in essays scattered in numerous journals. In his view, the 1968 Tolkien and the Critics "was a milestone that gathered some of the most significant such essays (those by Auden, Bradley, and Lewis, for example), and commissioned several new ones (notably by Mary Quella Kelly on Tolkien's poetry and John Tinkler on the use of Old English in The Lord of the Rings)."

=== 1981 collection ===
Reviewing the 1981 collection, M. Chassagnol wrote that the essays by McLellan and Adams took opposing sides on the merits of The Silmarillion. In his view, McLellan asserted "without really justifying it" that the work "demands comparison with Hesiod and The Iliad, Paradise Lost and Genesis", while on the other hand Adams, "more convincingly" saw nothing in it but "an empty and pompous bore".

In Christianity and Literature, Janice G. Neuleib wrote that the volume must have been carefully prepared, as it covered a wide range of viewpoints incorporating "the best of earlier works" alongside new essays, forming "as good an overview of Tolkien scholarship as one can find".

David M. Miller, reviewing the book in Modern Fiction Studies, calls Adams one of "the old guard", who "laments that The Silmarillion is not 'Son-of-Ring' and who wonders why people don't read the real stuff, rather than Tolkien's fakes." He respects Flieger and Kuznets for their essays which "make modest claims for clear theses and keep the text firmly in mind." He is less impressed by the essayists who assume or insist that The Lord of the Rings is Christian, giving as example Frodo's claiming of the One Ring at the Crack of Doom: "I will not do this deed. The Ring is mine!". Accordingly he objects to Zimbardo's psychological rewriting of the scene: "In fighting the Gollum in himself and subduing it, Frodo (i.e. Frodo/Gollum) is able at last to drop the Ring of Oneness - of falsely defined individuation - into the Crack of Doom". Broadly welcoming the book, Miller comments that Timothy O'Neill's Jungian The Individuated Hobbit should have been mentioned; and if "the Procrustean Christians are invited, Jane Nitzsche's Tolkien's Art should be called."

=== 2004 collection ===
Ron Ratliff, reviewing the 2004 collection for Library Journal, calls it a "splendid anthology". He comments that the dislike of figures like Edmund Wilson and Germaine Greer for The Lord of the Rings is well known, but that the "excellent essays" in its defence by C. S. Lewis and W. H. Auden are less familiar, and very welcome in the collection.

== See also ==
- Tolkien and the Invention of Myth, a collection of essays edited by Jane Chance

== Sources ==
- Zimbardo, Rose A.; Isaacs, Neil D., eds. (2004). Understanding the Lord of the Rings. Houghton Mifflin Harcourt. ISBN 978-0-618-42253-1.
