= MARPAT =

US Marine Corps camouflage pattern

MARPAT (Marine Pattern)
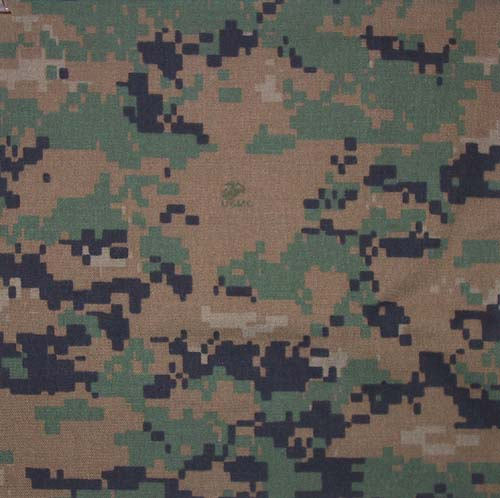
- A swatch of MARPAT-printed fabric in the woodland pattern variant
- Type: Military camouflage pattern
- Place of origin: United States

Service history
- In service: 2002–present
- Used by: U.S. Marine Corps; U.S. Navy (primarily corpsmen, chaplains, and religious program specialists, all while attached to Marine Corps units; Worn with "U.S. Navy" nametapes and Navy rank & insignia); Navy ROTC (Marine-option midshipmen only); Marine Corps JROTC; New York Naval Militia (Marine Reservist & prior-service Marine members only); See Users for non-U.S. users
- Wars: In US service: War in Afghanistan; Iraq War; In non-US service: Insurgency in Northeast India; Naxalite-Maoist Insurgency; Insurgency in Jammu and Kashmir; Russo-Georgian war Insurgency in Northern Chad; Syrian civil war Yemeni civil war Internal conflict in Myanmar (including the Myanmar civil war); Iranian intervention in the Russian invasion of Ukraine

Production history
- Designer: Timothy O'Neill, Anabela Dugas, Kenneth G. Henley, John Joseph Heisterman, Jr., Luisa DeMorais Santos, Gabriel R. Patricio, Deirdre E. Townes
- Designed: 2000–2001
- Produced: 2001–present
- Variants: Desert MARPAT; Woodland MARPAT; Winter MARPAT (used only on select cold-weather outer-garments; While the pattern is still "digital," it differs markedly from the other MARPAT variants); Urban MARPAT (prototype only, never used operationally); See Design and colors for more details

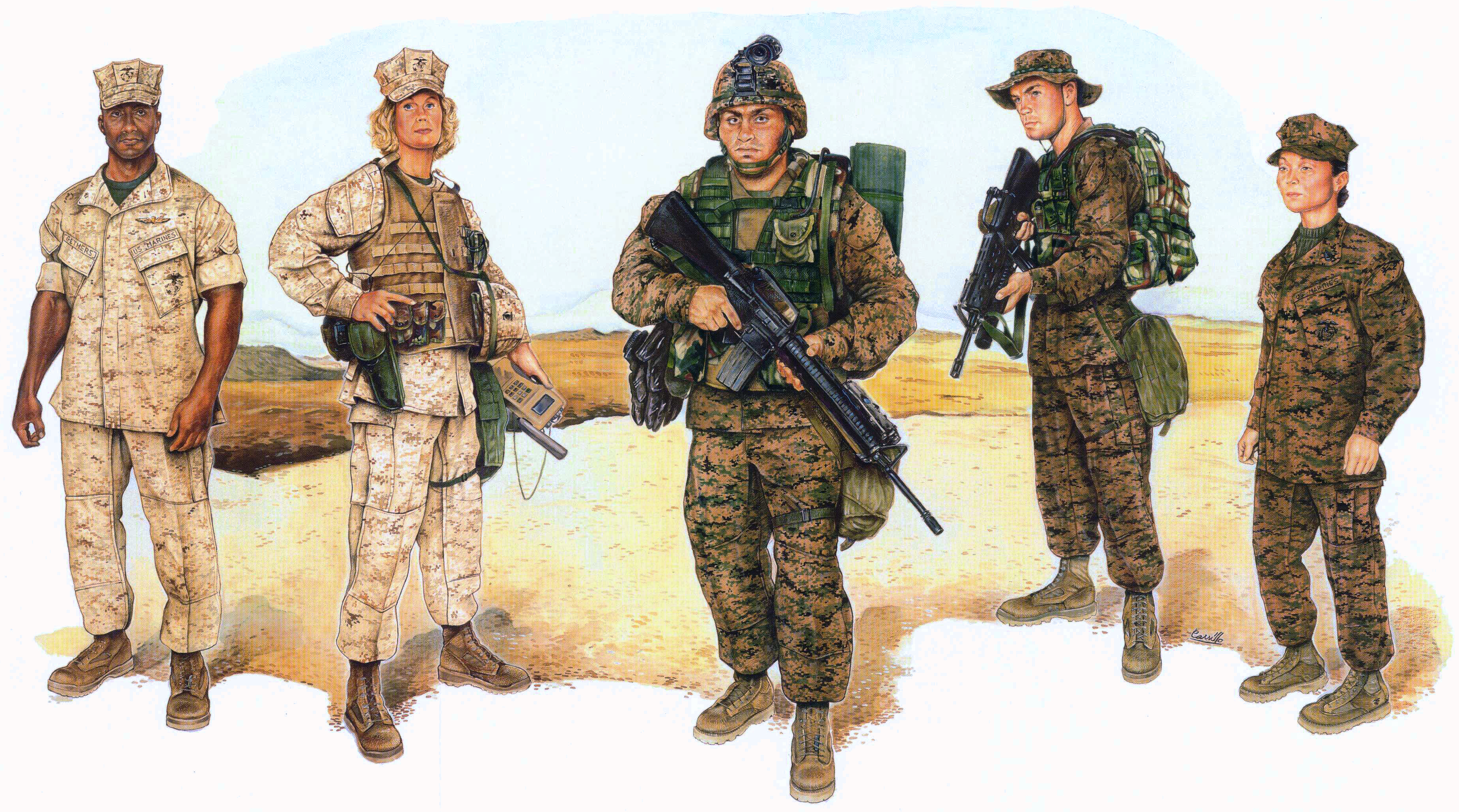
A 2003 drawing showcasing the Marine Corps Combat Utility Uniform in desert and woodland camouflage variants

MARPAT (short for Marine pattern) is a multi-scale camouflage pattern in use with the United States Marine Corps, designed in 2001 and introduced from late 2002 to early 2005 with the Marine Corps Combat Utility Uniform (MCCUU), which replaced the Camouflage Utility Uniform. Its design and concept are based on the Canadian CADPAT pattern. The pattern is formed of small rectangular pixels of color.

In theory, it is a far more effective camouflage than standard uniform patterns because it mimics the dappled textures and rough boundaries found in natural settings. It is also known as the "digital pattern" or "digi-cammies" because of its micropattern (pixels) rather than the old macropattern (big blobs).

The United States government has patented MARPAT, including specifics of its manufacture. By regulation, the pattern and items incorporating it, such as the MCCUU and ILBE backpack, are to be supplied by authorized manufacturers only and are not for general commercial sale, although imitations are available such as "Digital Woodland Camo" or "Digital Desert Camo".

MARPAT was also chosen because it distinctively identifies its wearers as Marines to their adversaries, while simultaneously helping its wearers remain concealed. This was demonstrated by a Marine spokesman at the launch of MARPAT, who stated: "We want to be instantly recognized as a force to be reckoned with. We want them to see us coming a mile away in our new uniforms." As such, the U.S. Marine Corps restricts use of the camouflage, preventing its use in most other divisions of the United States military with the exception of some elements of the U.S. Navy.

== Development ==
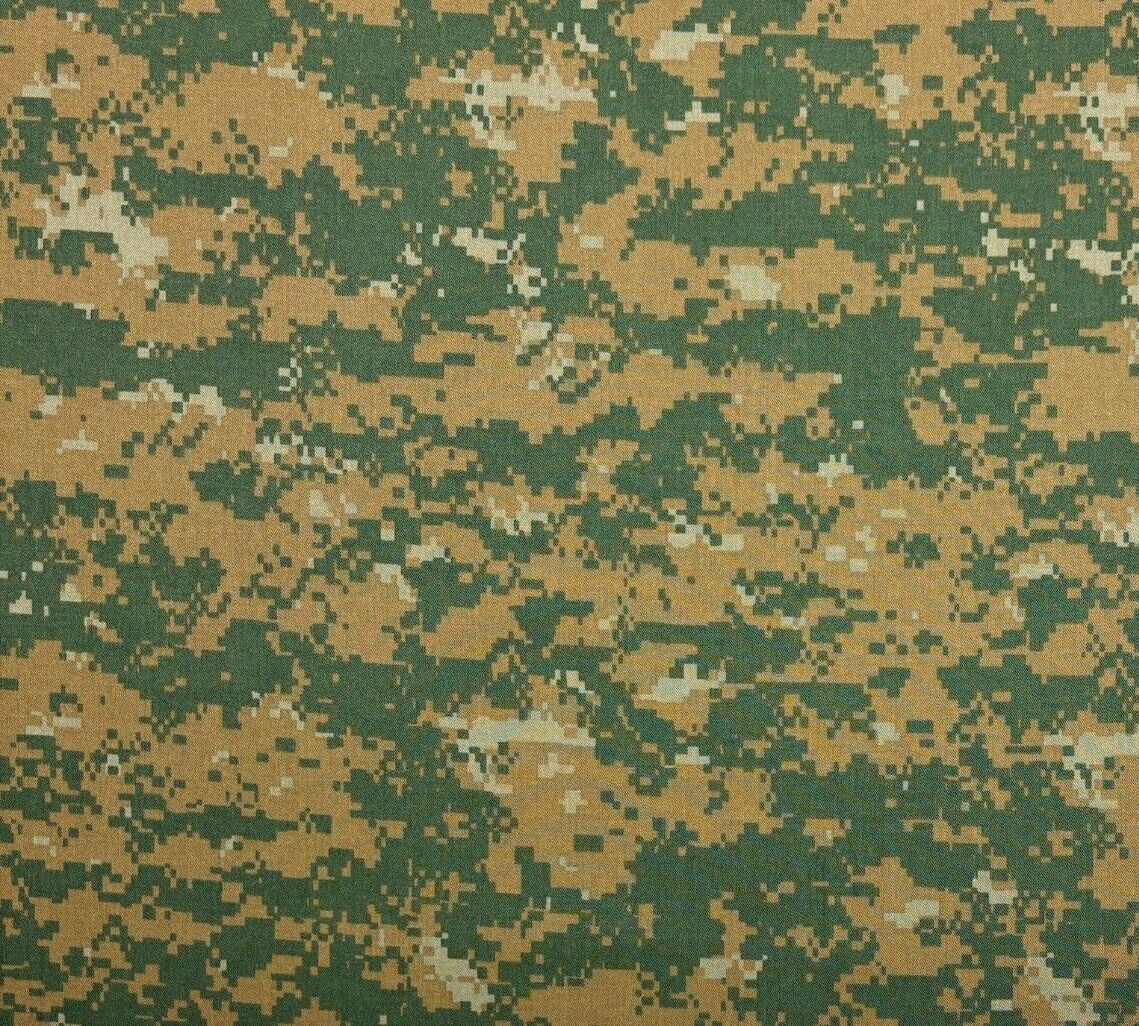
Woodland MARPAT with embedded EGAs and black elements omitted, used for the sewing of nametapes.

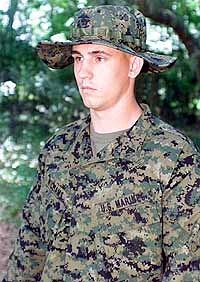
A U.S. Marine showcasing the MCCUU in woodland MARPAT in 2001

MARPAT was designed by Timothy O'Neill, Anabela Dugas, Kenneth G. Henley, John Joseph Heisterman Jr., Luisa DeMorais Santos, Gabriel R. Patricio, and Deirdre E. Townes.

The concept of using miniature swatches of color as opposed to large splotches is not new. In World War II, German troops used various patterns similar to the current German Flecktarn, which involved similar small dabs of color on a uniform to provide camouflage.

The Canadian Forces originally developed the pattern called CADPAT, on which MARPAT was based. O'Neill's USMC design team in charge of this process, initially with the assistance of Kenneth G. Henley and then John Joseph Heisterman Jr. (both active duty U.S. Marine Scout Snipers), went through over 150 different camo patterns before selecting three samples that met their initial objectives. These were two versions of tigerstripe and an older design of Rhodesian DPM.The influence of tigerstripe can still be seen in the final MARPAT. These three samples were then reconstructed using new shapes and unique color blends that would allow a more effective uniform in a great range of environments.

The new patterns were then field tested in different environments, day and night, with night vision and various optics. MARPAT did exceptionally well in their wet uniform test when viewed with night vision while illuminated with IR, where normally patterns appear as a solid. The MARPAT patent lists U.S. Army research into fractal pattern camouflage as the basis for MARPAT.

The MARPAT pattern was chosen in a run-off against seven other patterns at the USMC Scout Sniper Instructor School.

Preliminary development of MARPAT began in April 2000, with field testing of the pattern and the MCCUU beginning in 2001. The patent for the MARPAT pattern was filed on June 19, 2001, whereas the patent for the MCCUU uniform was filed on November 7, 2001. Early prototypes of the MARPAT desert pattern from 2001 featured grey, whereas the finished product did not.

In 2001, Marine Forces Pacific Lt. Gen. Frank Libutti and Sgt. Maj. Stephen Mellinger were the first Marines to publicly wear the uniform before the uniform made its official debut at Camp Lejeune, North Carolina on January 17, 2002. In February 2003, MARPAT-patterned helmet covers began to be produced. The replacement of the BDU and DCU by the MCCUU was completed on October 1, 2004, a year ahead of the original requirement date set in 2001 of October 1, 2005.

The MARPAT uniform was officially fielded as standard issue to the officer candidates of OCC-181 at MCB Quantico and the recruits of 3rd BN Mike Company at MCRD San Diego in late 2002;It continues to be the USMC's standard issue uniform pattern to date.

In all, the MARPAT development process from concept to completion took 18 months, the fastest time for a U.S. military-developed camouflage pattern to be produced.

== Design and colors ==
Different ratios and variations of colors were tested before final candidate patterns were actually printed to textile for field trials. A modified version of Vietnam War–era tiger stripe also made it to final trials but was eliminated due to MARPAT being superior in all environments. The purpose of the digitized pattern is to create visual "noise" and prevent the eye from identifying any visual templates. Thus, the pattern is intended to not register as any particular shape or pattern that could be distinguished.

There were initially three MARPAT patterns tested: Woodland, Desert, and Urban. While keeping the rights for Urban, only the Woodland and Desert patterns were adopted by the Marine Corps for general issue, replacing the U.S. Woodland pattern and the U.S. Three-Color Desert pattern. Webbing and equipment worn with MARPAT Woodland and MARPAT Desert is produced in Coyote Brown, a mid-tone color common to both the woodland and desert patterns. These colors are drab and supposedly natural looking, and are medium toned to reflect surrounding light and color. This is instead of earlier "primary" colors.

Although a digital snow pattern has also been adopted on cold-weather training over-garments, this uses a different pattern from the Canadian company Hyperstealth.

Authentic MARPAT material is distinguishable by a miniature "Eagle, Globe, and Anchor" emblem incorporated into the pattern above the letters "USMC", in both the woodland and desert patterns.

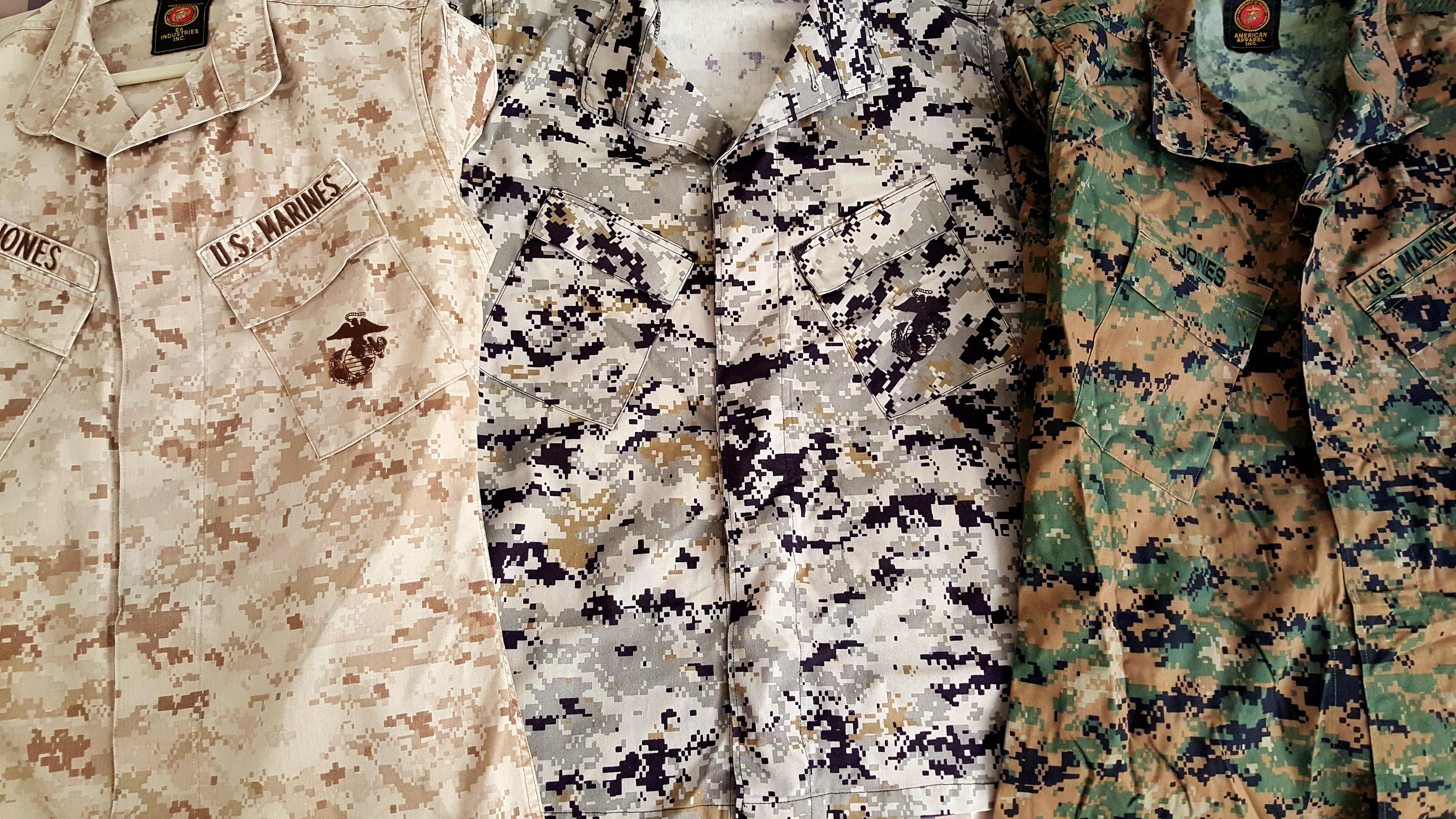
The three tested MARPAT patterns: Desert, Urban, and Woodland pattern

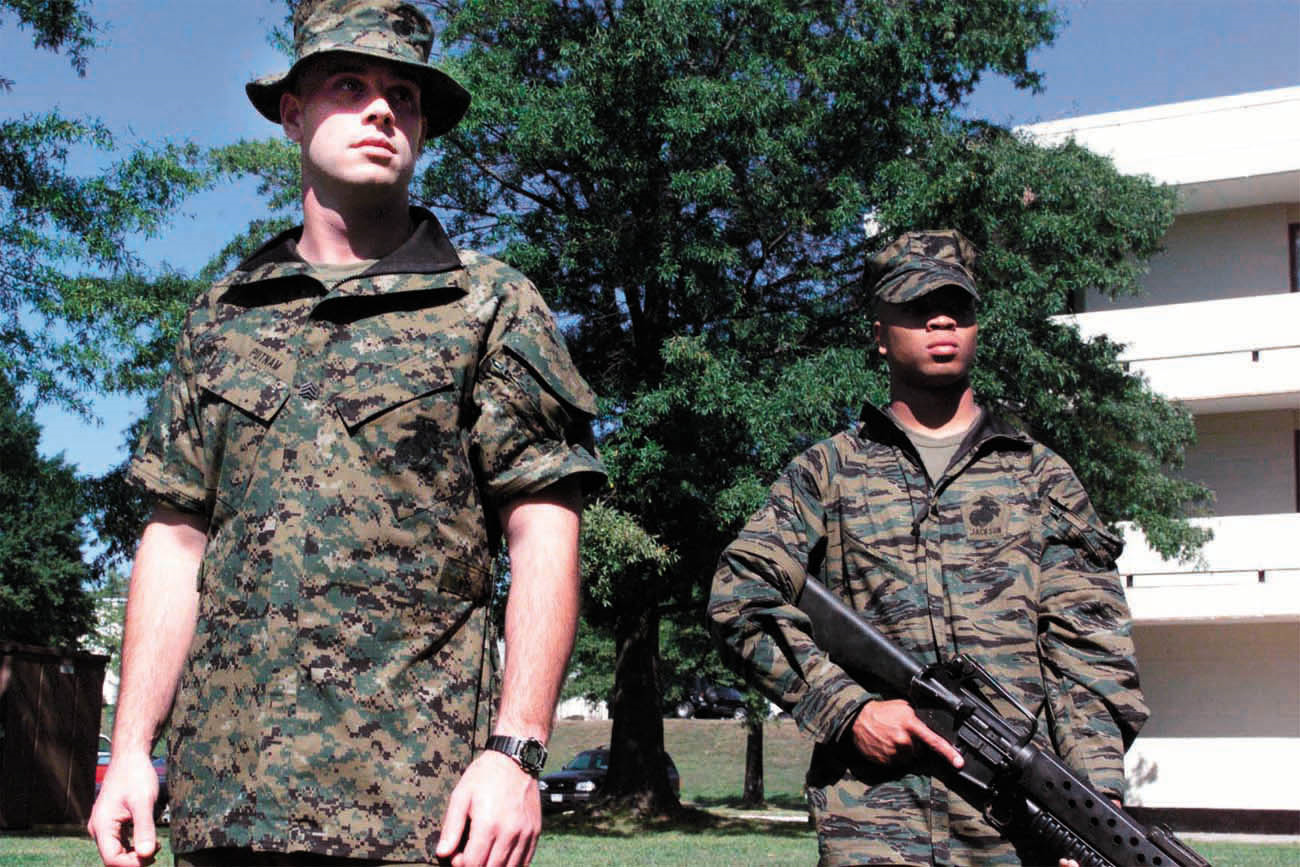
Two U.S. Marines test out early prototypes of the MCCUU in 2001. The two prototypes feature removable sleeves, a feature that was later abandoned on the finished production version. The uniform on the left features an early version of woodland MARPAT.

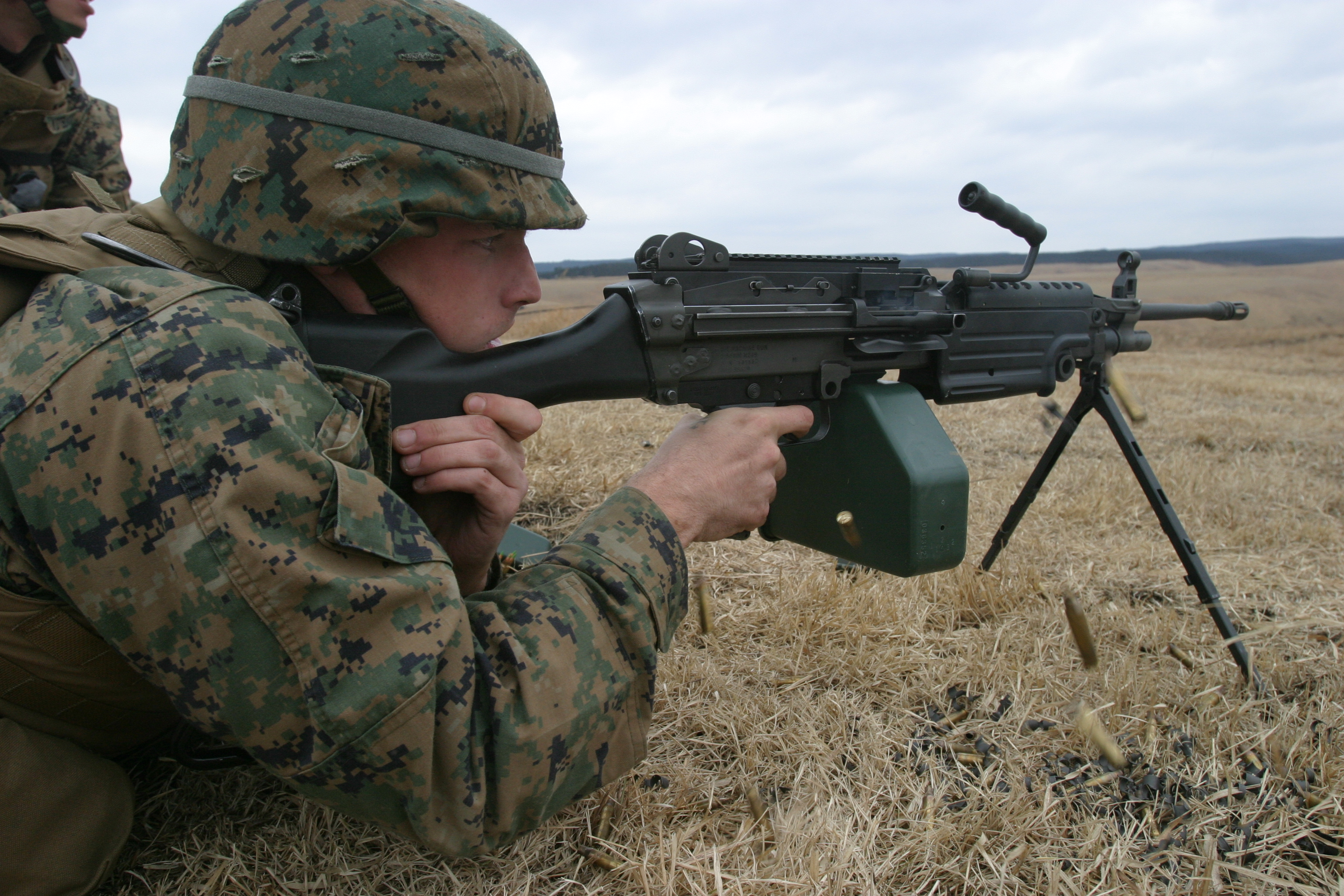
Woodland variant of MARPAT

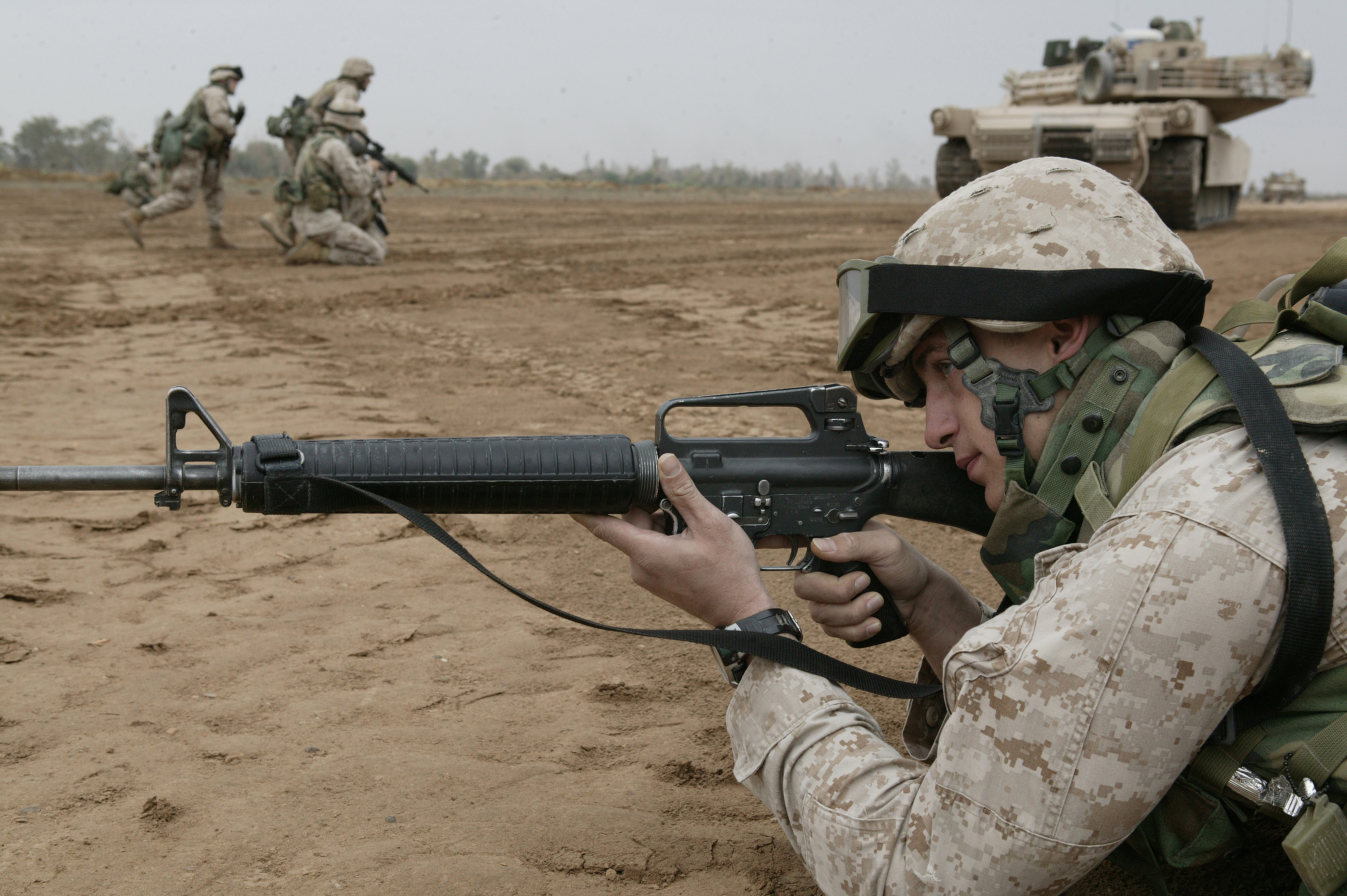
Desert variant of MARPAT

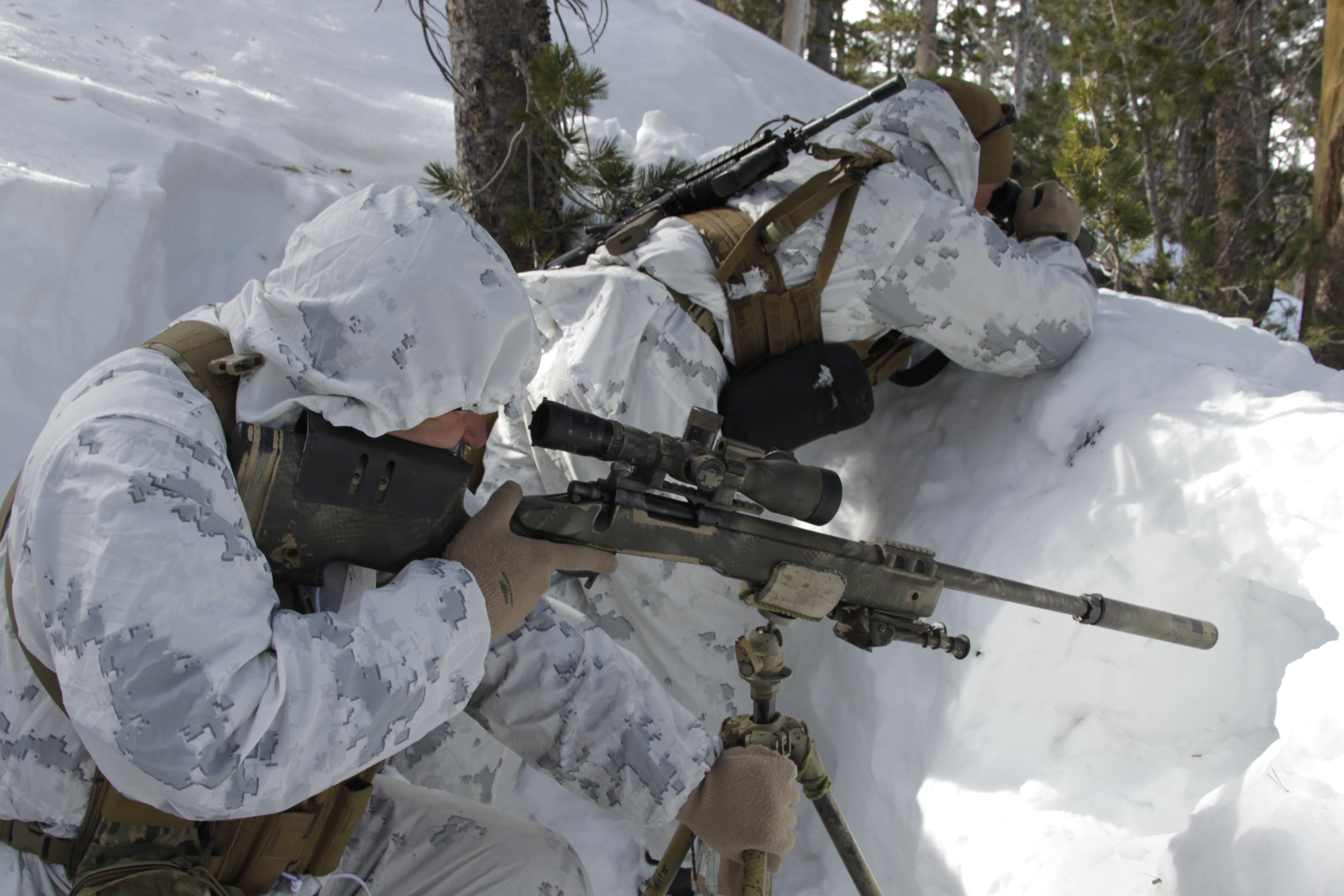
U.S. Marines wearing snow-patterned MARPAT overgarments at the Mountain Warfare Training Center

== Similar designs ==
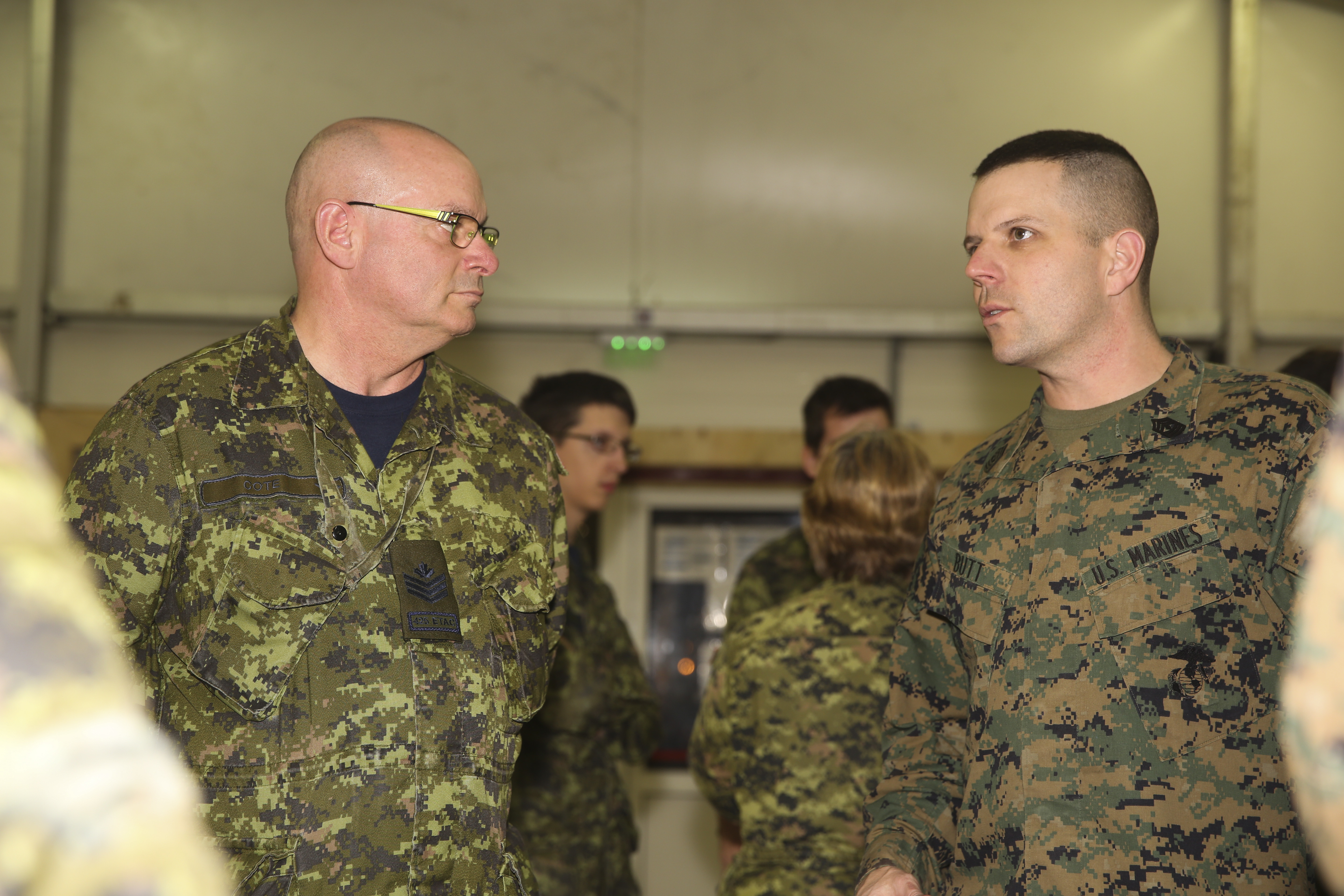
A Canadian airman in CADPAT (left); a U.S. marine dressed in MARPAT

MARPAT is aesthetically similar to Canadian Forces CADPAT, which was first developed in the 1990s.

The United States Army used the same shapes in designing its Universal Camouflage Pattern, which uses a much paler three-color scheme of sage green, grey and sand for use on the Army Combat Uniform. After major questions about its effectiveness arose, the Army adopted the "Scorpion W2" Operational Camouflage Pattern in 2015, which was fully phased in by 2019.

The United States Air Force designed its own Airman Battle Uniform (ABU) using a standard tiger stripe pattern and slight variation on the color scheme of ACU. It was also phased out by the OCP uniform by 2021.

U.S. Marine wearing Desert MARPAT (left) and an Iraqi Policeman wearing the since-discontinued Navy Working Uniform Type I (right)

The United States Navy announced approval for a digital "BDU-style" work uniform in late 2008. The Navy Working Uniform (NWU) was chosen by surveyed sailors for consistency and longer life, while the blue-grey-black Type I pattern was designed for aesthetic purposes rather than camouflage to disguise them at sea. In January 2010, the Navy began considering new Navy Working Uniform patterns modified from MARPAT, with a Type II desert pattern and Type III woodland pattern. The Woodland pattern was actually an earlier coloration of the MARPAT scheme, not adopted following USMC trials. These patterns are overall darker than their respective MARPAT equivalents, modified with different color shades. They were introduced because the blue and grey Type I pattern was not meant for a tactical environment (the Battle Dress Uniform in M81 woodland and Desert Camouflage Uniform were still used for this purpose until the Type II and III patterns were introduced). Backlash from Marines, including an objection from former Commandant Conway, led to restrictions when NAVADMIN 374/09 was released: Type II pattern is restricted to Naval Special Warfare personnel while deployed, while the NWU Type III is the standard shore working uniform for all Naval personnel effective October 1, 2019. The blue and grey Type I uniform was discontinued .

ARMPAT, an Armenian version of the MARPAT pattern, is currently used by the Armenian Armed Forces, and the Artsakh Defense Army. It has the same design as the MARPAT, but with different color sets.

== Users ==
- Argentina: Temperate and desert versions used by Argentine Naval Infantry and some special forces units including the SOFG and the Amphibious Commandos Group.
- Bahamas: Used by RBDF soldiers.
- Bolivia: Temperate and desert versions used by some Bolivian Army and police units from 2013.
- Bosnia and Herzegovina
- Brazil: Used by BOPE in woodland operations.
- Chad: MARPAT clones (Temperate/woodland versions) used by Chadian troops.
- Chile: MARPAT clones in limited use by the Chilean Army. Replaced by MultiCam as of 2021.
- Cyprus: Woodland clones used by Cypriot special forces.
- Ecuador: Ecuador adopted a pattern features black, green & khaki shapes on a brown background in 2007.
- Georgia: Was the standard issue camouflage of the Georgian military from 2007 to 2014 with temperate and desert versions used, used on US-made uniforms, when it was replaced by MultiCam. Still in limited use by Georgian Police and paramilitaries as of 2017.
- Haiti: Used by Armed Forces of Haiti and some specialized units in the Haitian National Police (USGPN, UDMO).
- India: Used by Garud Commando Force and Para SF in jungle operations.
- Hungary: Desert variant used by the Hungarian Prison Service
- Iran: Temperate MARPAT clones used by IRGC Sepah forces.
- Lebanon: Woodland MARPAT worn by Commando Regiment and desert MARPAT worn by Airborne Regiment.
- Mongolia: Clones of MARPAT used by the 084th Special Task Battalion.
- Myanmar: Used by some PDF units as of 2022.
- North Macedonia: Used by Special Task Unit "Tiger". Used by officers of the Special Support Unit.
- Saint Lucia: MARPAT clone used by Royal Saint Lucia Police Force units.
- Saudi Arabia: Clones of the desert MARPAT seen with Saudi troops. Used by Al-Afwaj Regiment, Ministry of Interior (Saudi Arabia).
- Serbia: Clones of MARPAT seen in use by the Serbian Gendarmerie.
- Ukraine: Used by some divisions of the Armed Forces of Ukraine from special forces to airborne units.

=== Non-state actors ===
- People's Protection Units

== Gallery ==
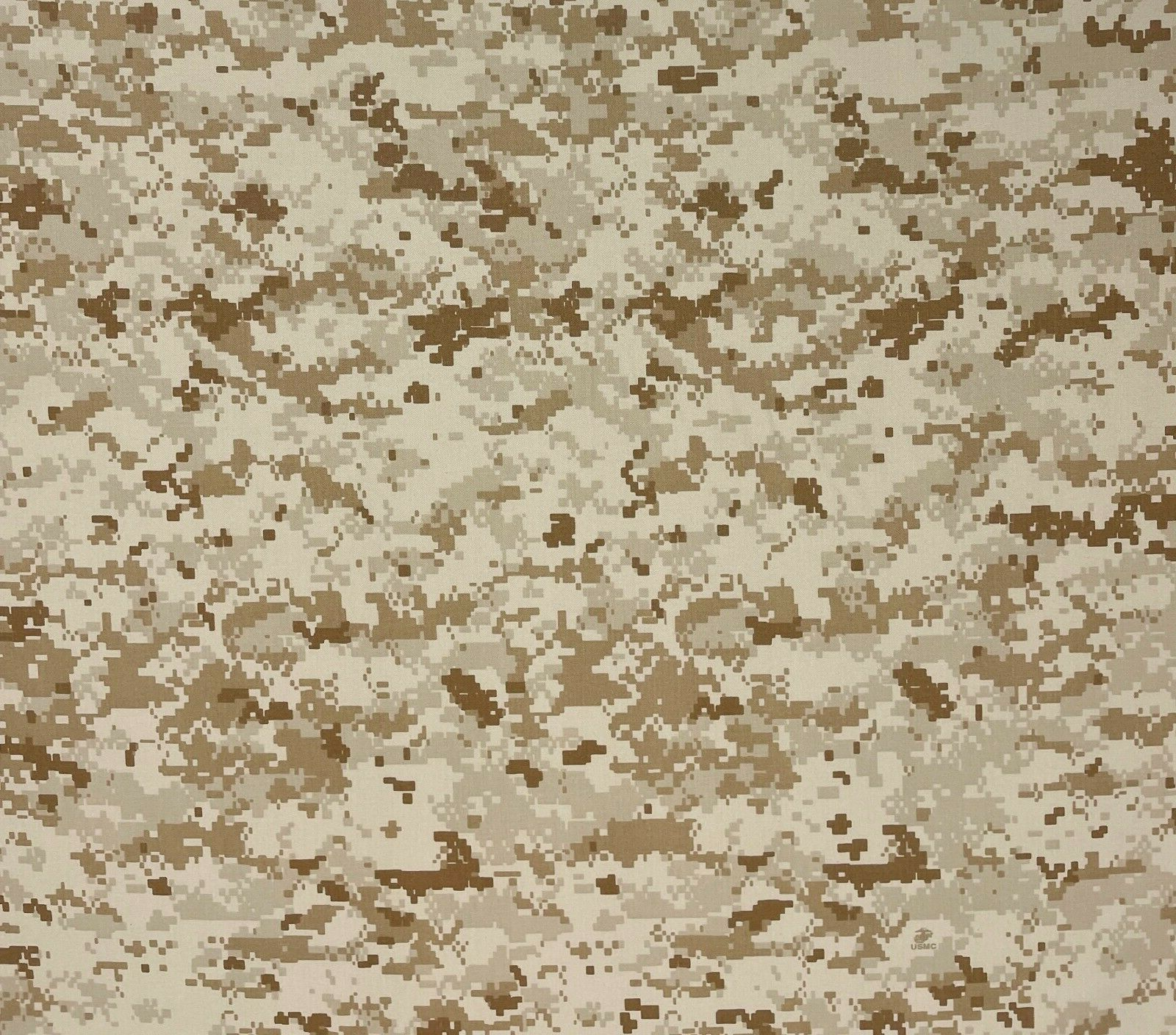
A 24.66 inches (626 mm)-wide fabric swatch of MARPAT desert pattern

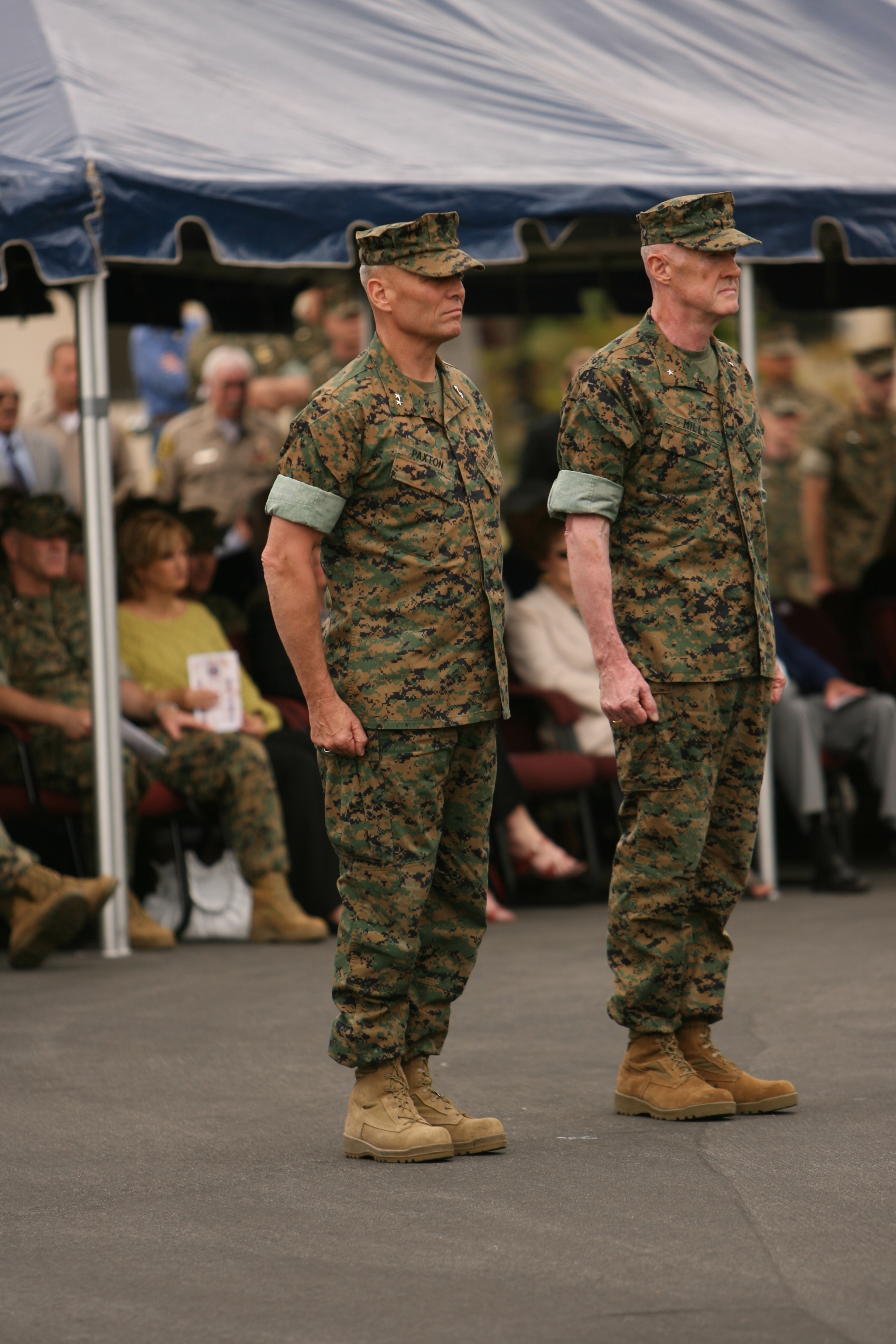
Two generals wearing woodland MARPAT at a ceremony

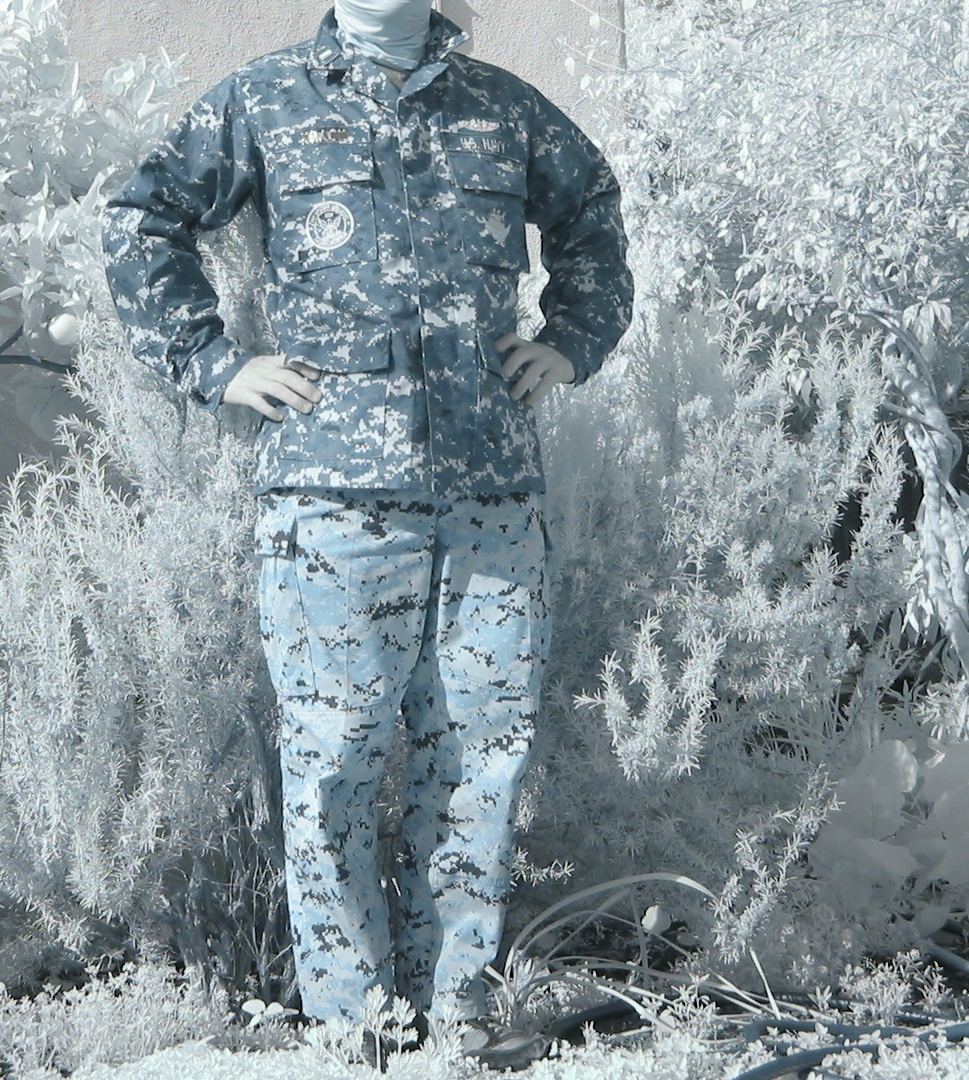
Near-infrared (low light night vision device) comparison of a Navy Working Uniform blouse to MARPAT trousers

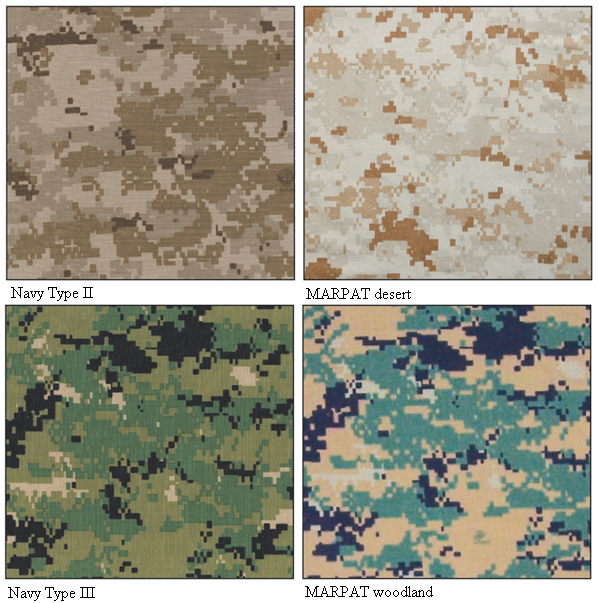
MARPAT compared to NWU Type II and Type III prototypes

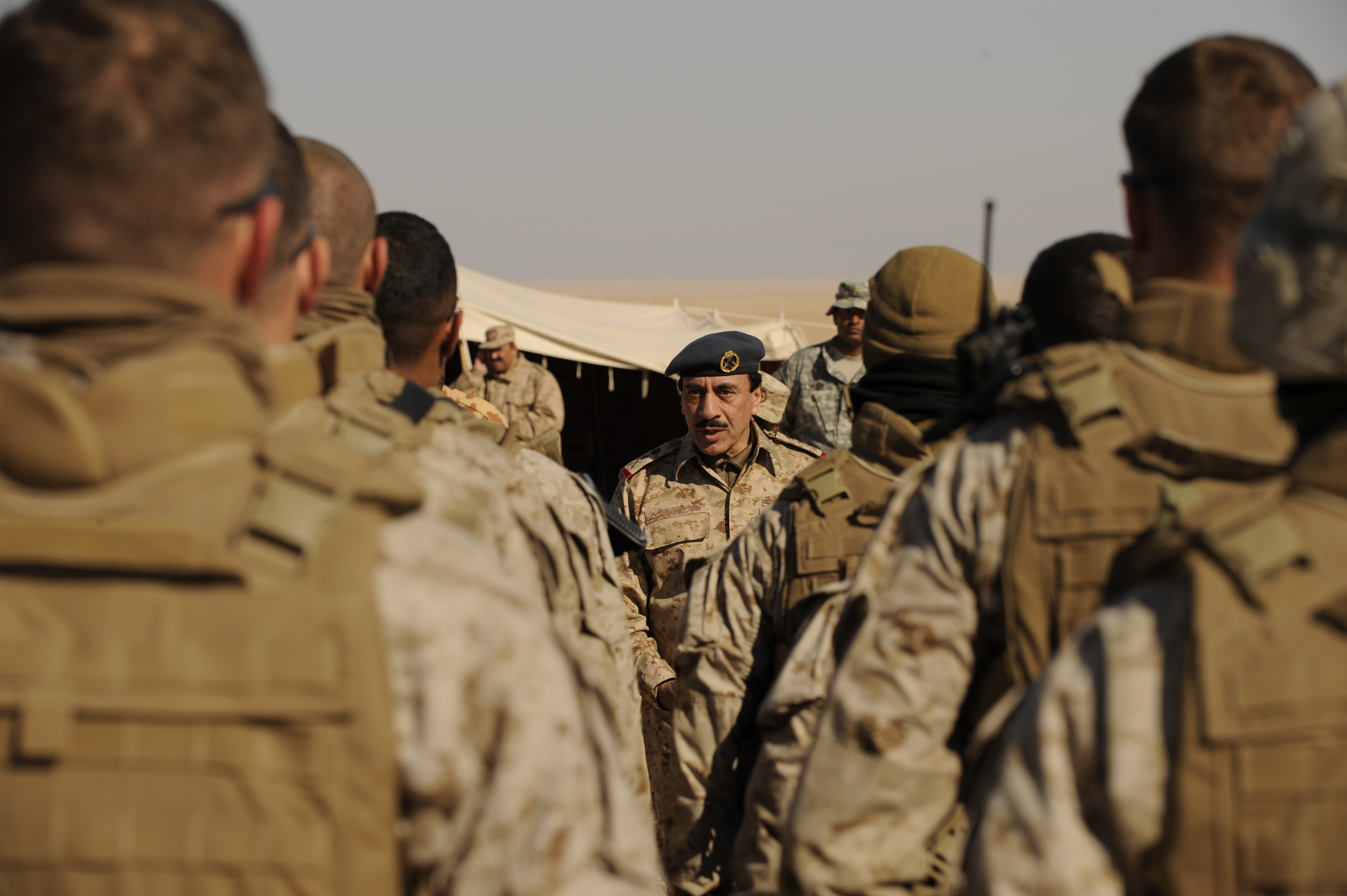
Air Marshal Fahad Al-Amir, the Chief of Staff of the Kuwaiti Armed Forces, speaks to Marines of the 26th Marine Expeditionary Unit wearing a camouflage similar to MARPAT

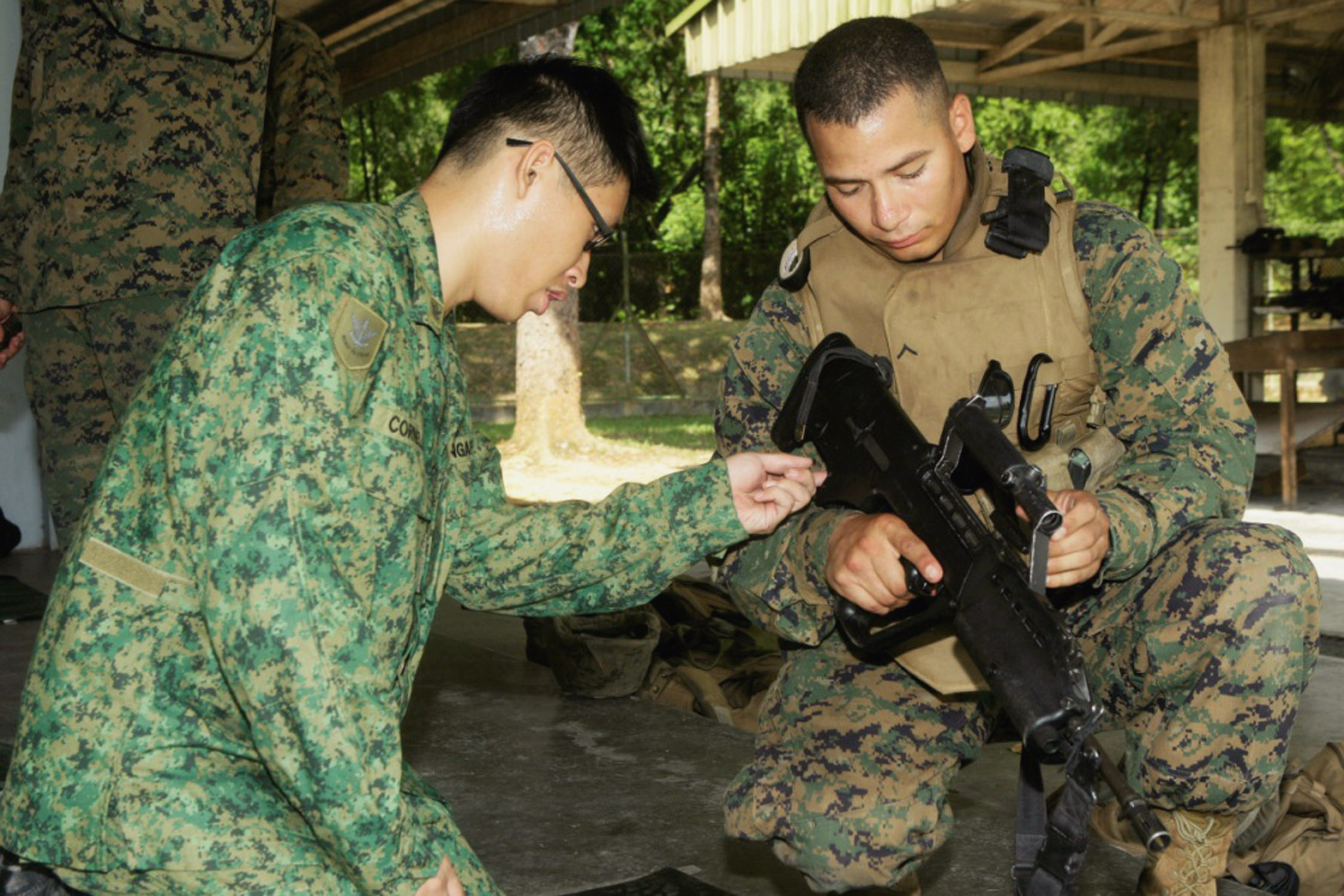
Camouflage comparison between a Singaporean guardsman and a U.S. Marine.

=== Outside the United States Marine Corps ===
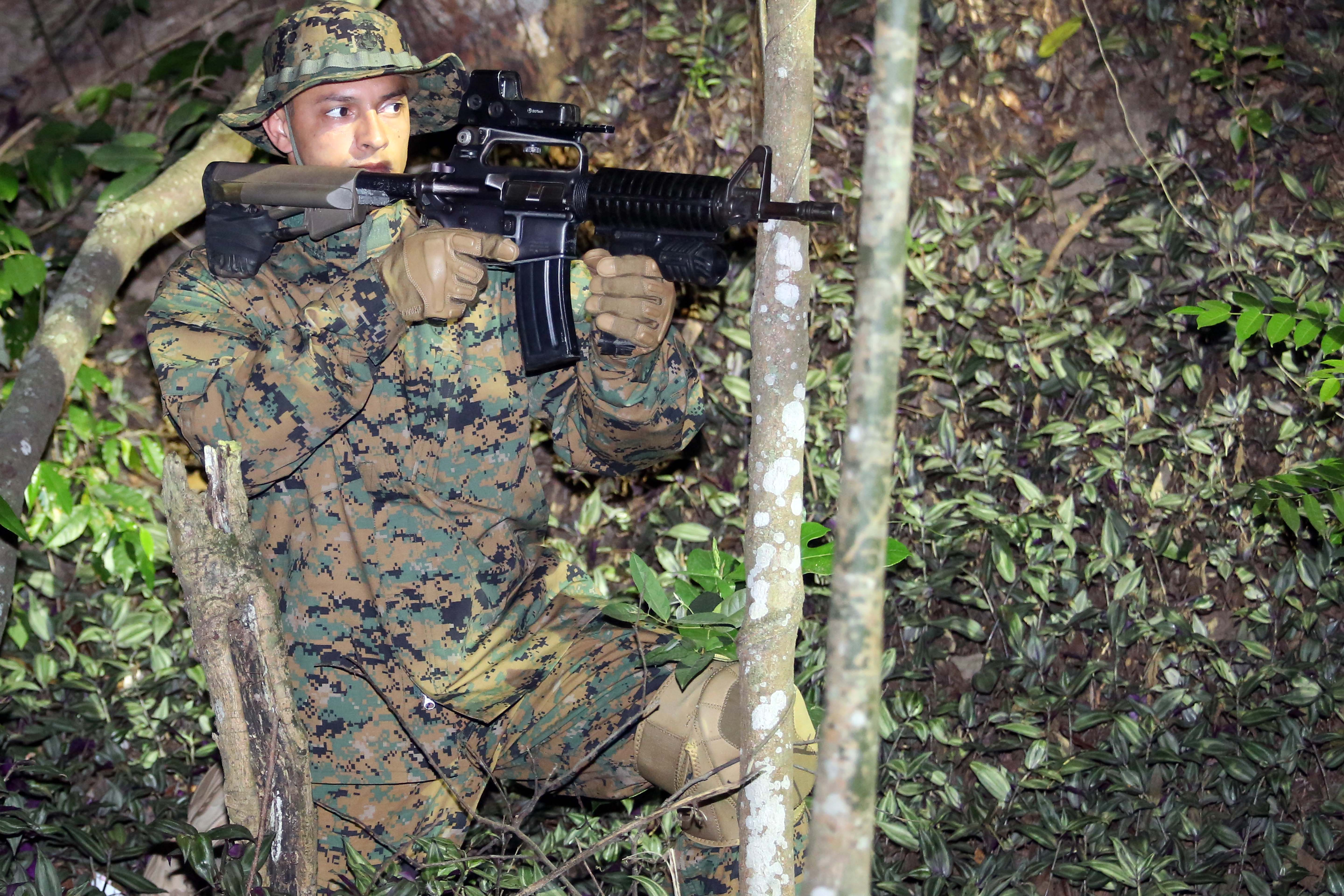
BOPE operator of the Rio de Janeiro Military Police in MARPAT fatigues

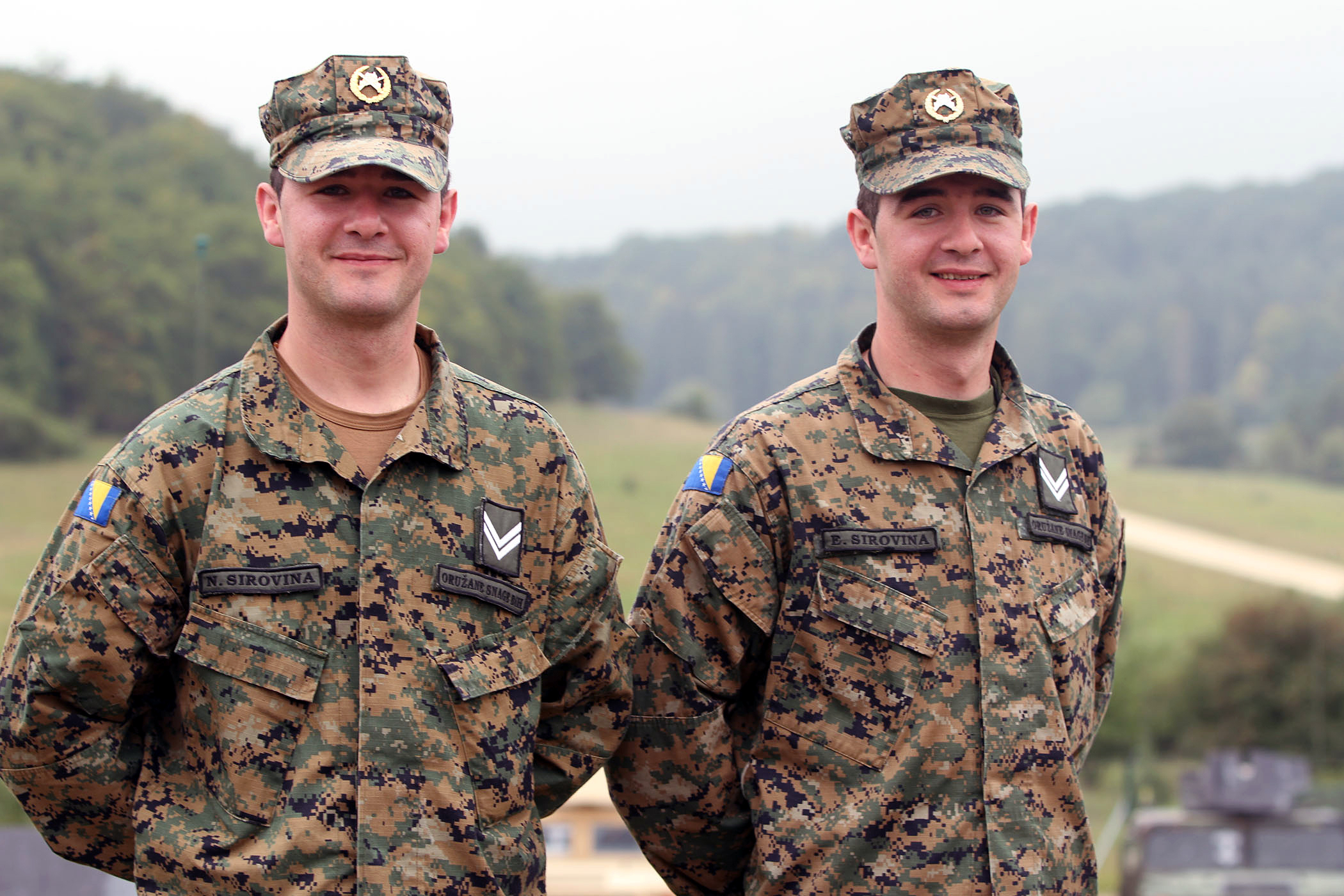
Twin soldiers of the Armed Forces of Bosnia and Herzegovina wearing MARPAT uniforms

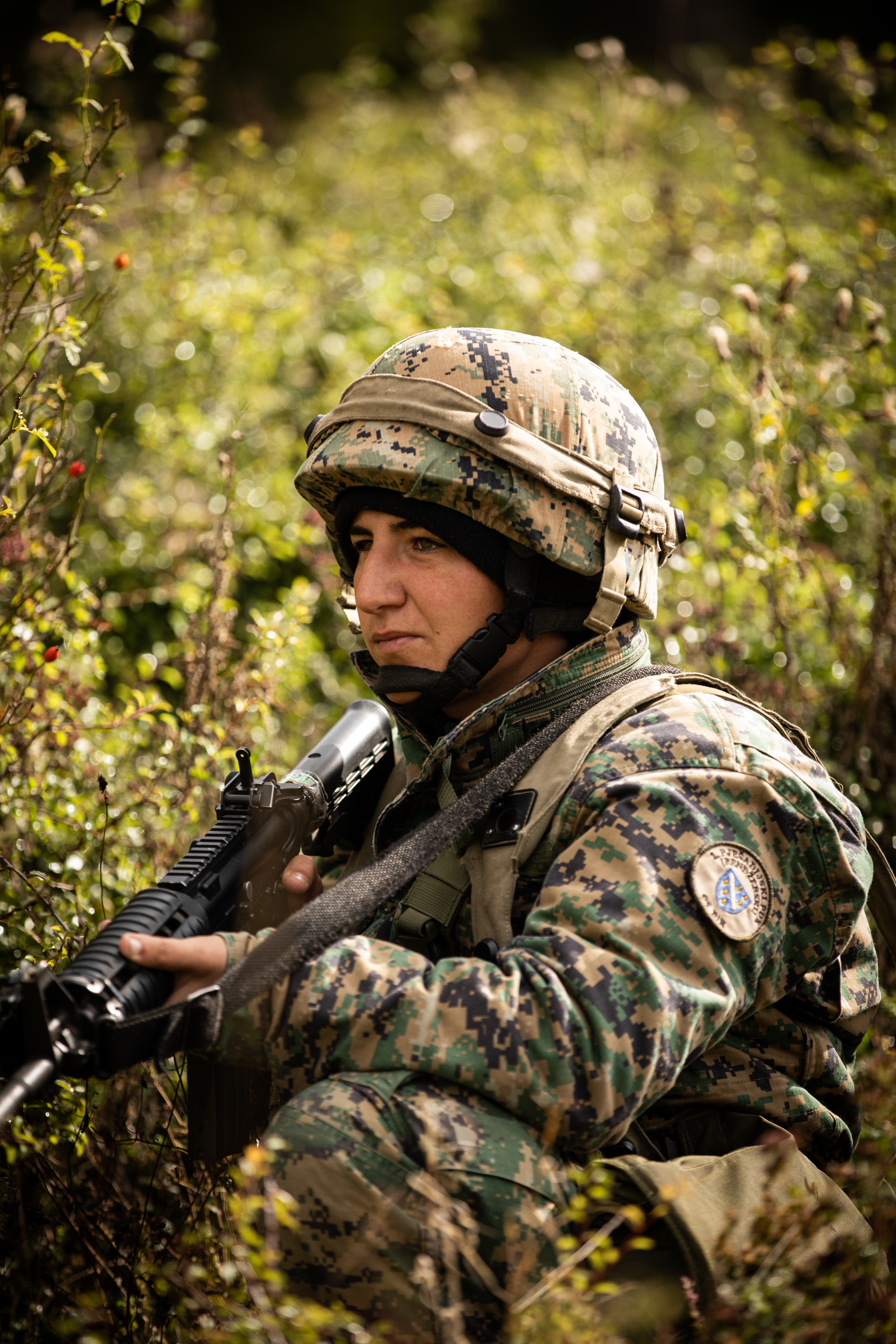
Bosnian soldier with equipment in MARPAT camouflage

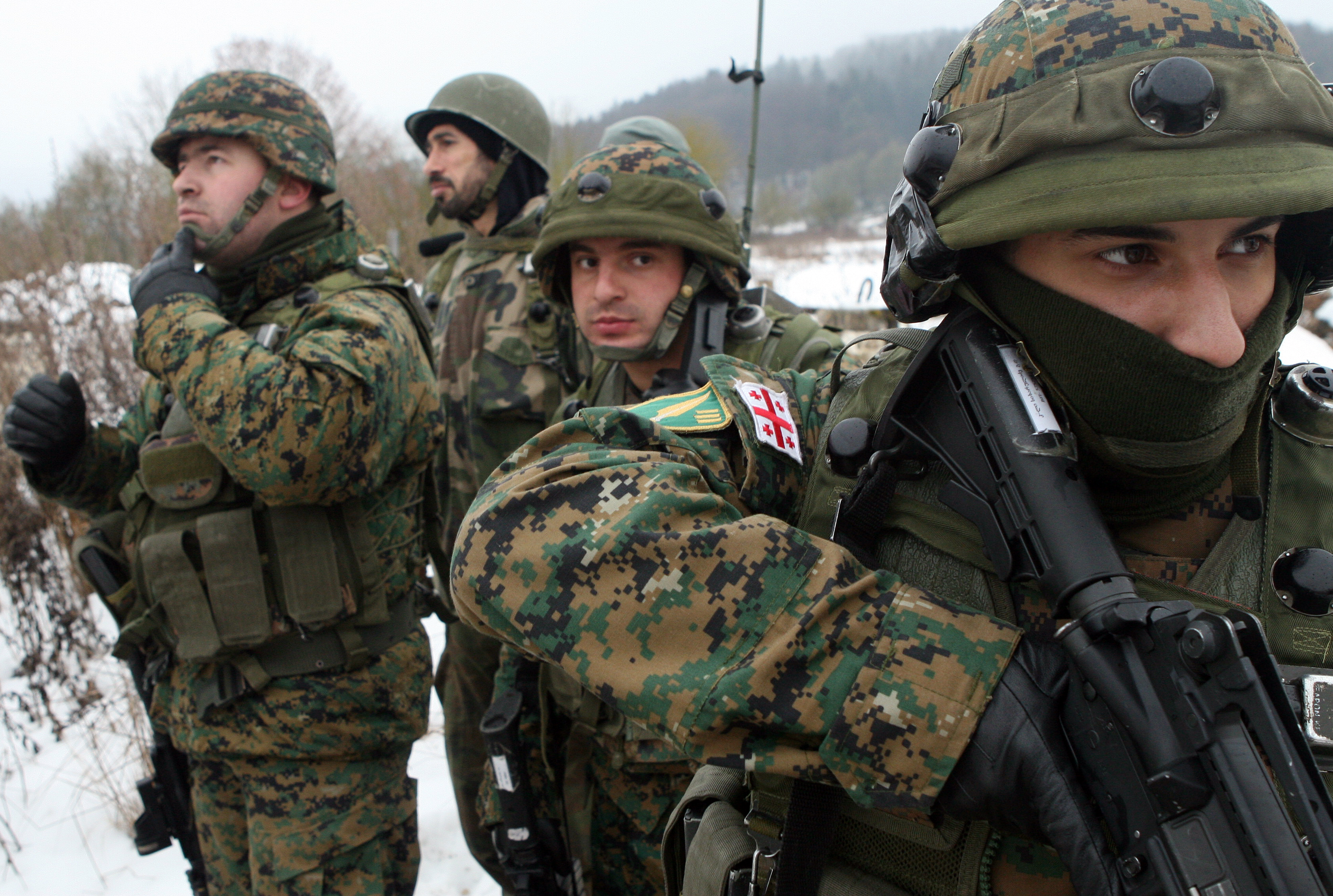
Georgian Land Forces soldiers, which used MARPAT as standard-issue until 2014

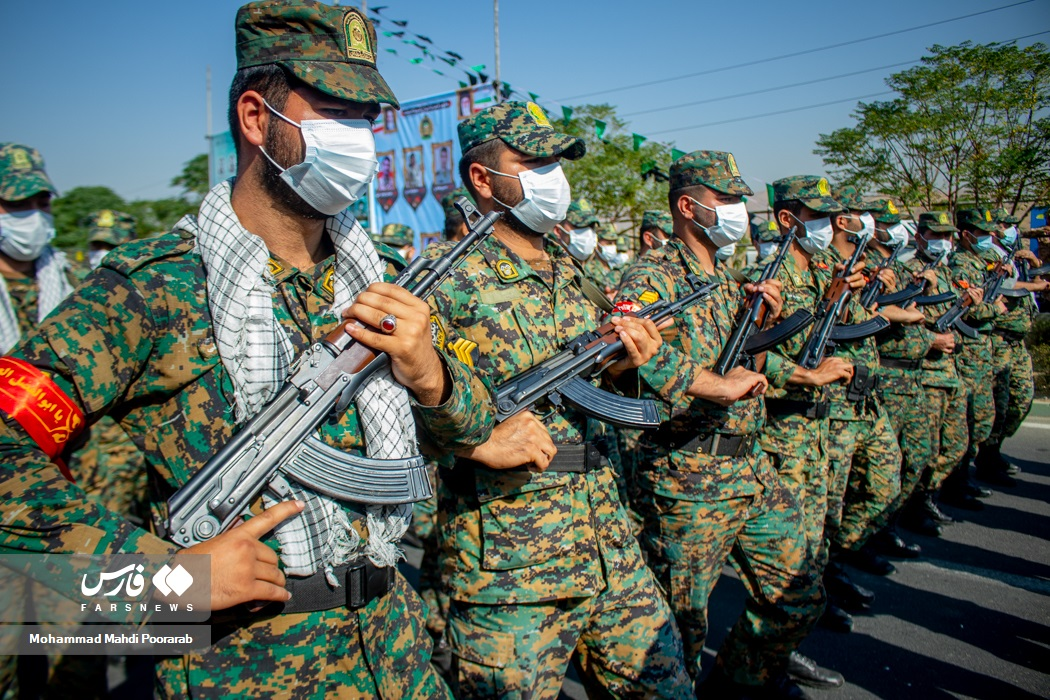
Islamic Revolutionary Guard Corps (IRGC) wearing MARPAT-clone uniforms in a military parade, 2022

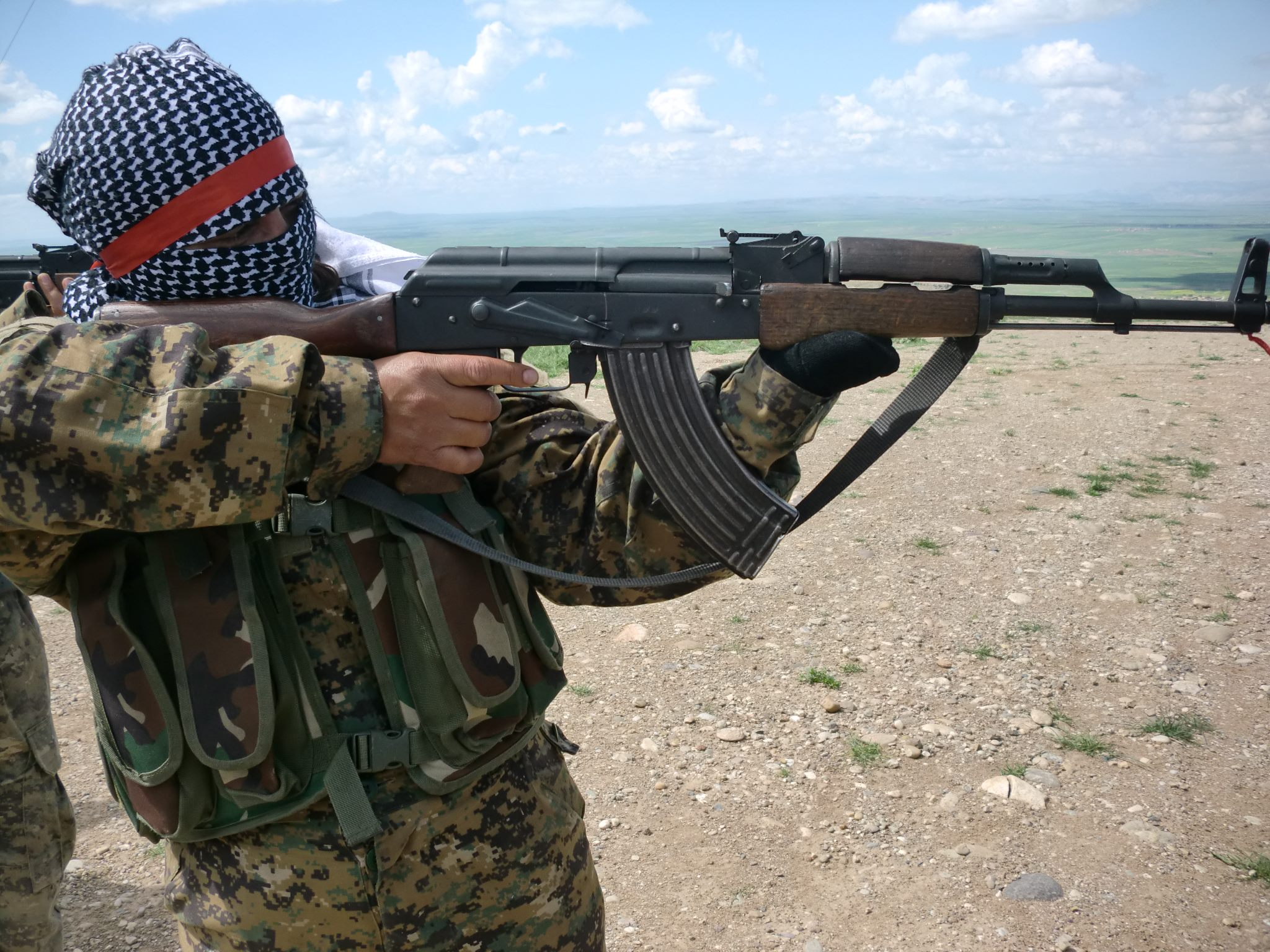
Kurdish YPG fighter wearing MARPAT

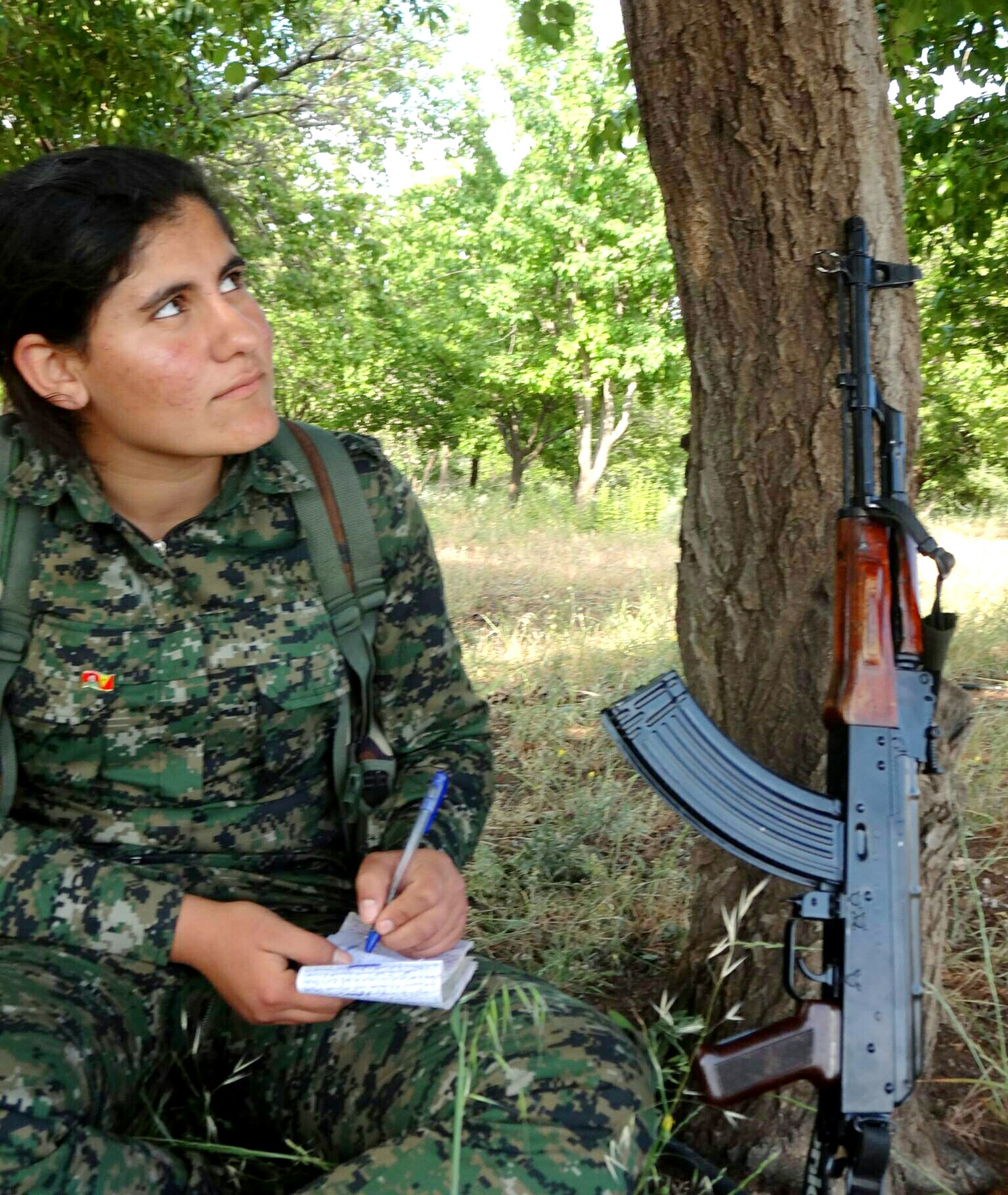
Kurdish Female fighter of the Women's Protection Units (YPJ) wearing MARPAT

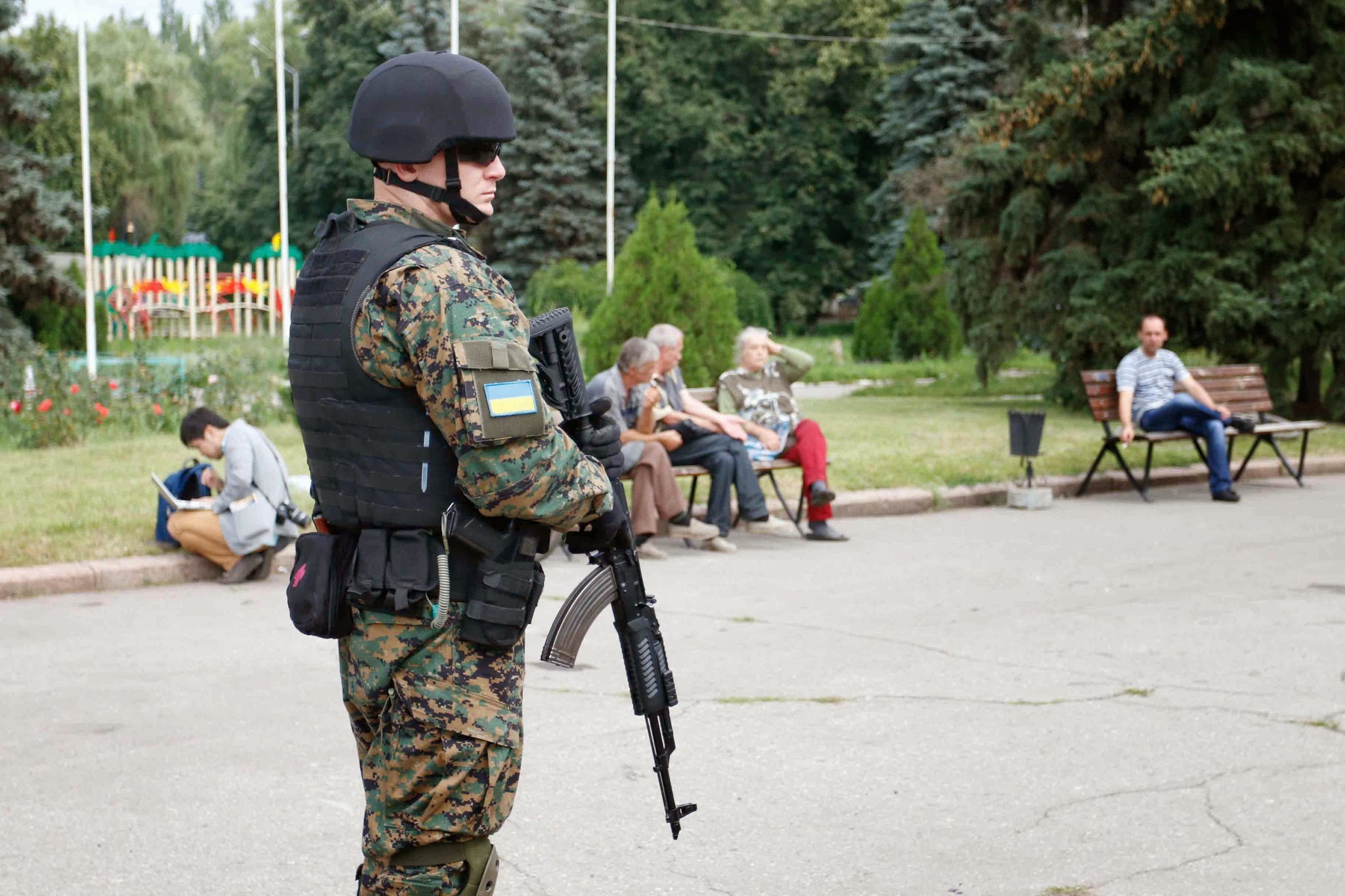
Ukrainian soldier patrolling Sloviansk in the aftermath of the Siege of Sloviansk wearing MARPAT fatigues
