= Timothy O'Neill (camoufleur) =

U.S. Army officer, professor and camouflage expert (1943–2023)

- Born: Timothy R. O'Neill; 1943
- Died: November 9, 2023 (aged 79–80); Atlanta, Georgia, U.S.
- Other name: "Father of digital camouflage"
- Occupations: Army officer, camouflage expert
- Known for: Digital camouflage
- Notable work: Dual-Tex camouflage pattern

Timothy R. O'Neill (1943 – November 9, 2023) was a U.S. Army officer, professor and camouflage expert, who in 1976 invented Dual-Tex, the first pattern of what would later be called digital camouflage. He has been called "father of digital camouflage". O'Neill wrote two works of fiction. In 1979 he published The Individuated Hobbit: Jung, Tolkien, and the Archetypes of Middle-Earth.

== Biography ==
Timothy O'Neill was educated at The Citadel, Charleston, gaining a bachelor's degree in political science; the University of North Carolina at Chapel Hill, studying MACT and experimental psychology; and after joining the army, the University of Virginia, where he gained his PhD in Experimental Psychology with a concentration in visual biophysics, writing his dissertation on "visual attraction of Blumian symmetry axes of visual forms". He served in the U.S. Army for 25 years from 1966. He served initially as a commander of tank and armored cavalry units. He gained a doctorate in camouflage, testing his ideas in the field at Fort Knox, Kentucky. In 1976, this work gained him a post as instructor at the West Point military academy, where he founded and was the first director of the program in engineering psychology. His work on digital camouflage led to the camouflage used on Army Combat Uniform. He reached the rank of lieutenant colonel. He retired from the army in 1991.

O'Neill then worked in industry, in Provant, Inc, and in U.S. Cavalry Security Gear and Systems, Inc. From 2001, he had frequently served as a camouflage consultant, working for the U.S. Army, Navy, and Marine Corps; the FBI; and the armed forces of Afghanistan, Canada, New Zealand, and Qatar. He assisted in the design of hunting camouflage for W. L. Gore & Associates, creating the Optifade pattern, based for the first time on study of the vision of deer, i.e. the animals that are to be fooled by the camouflage: it combines macro- and micro-patterns, and is said to work "amazingly well". For Hyperstealth Corp., he and the company's founder Guy Cramer designed the Razzacam pattern, said by David Rothenberg to be based on World War I dazzle camouflage "with pixelated and dithered patterns that are dizzying to look at, confounding our ability to parse their organizational structure". Also with Cramer, O'Neill developed a snow camouflage pattern for the U.S. Marine Corps.

O'Neill was married to Eufrona O'Neill and they lived in Alexandria, Virginia, and later in Roswell, Georgia. He died in Atlanta, Georgia, on November 9, 2023, aged 80.

== Digital camouflage ==
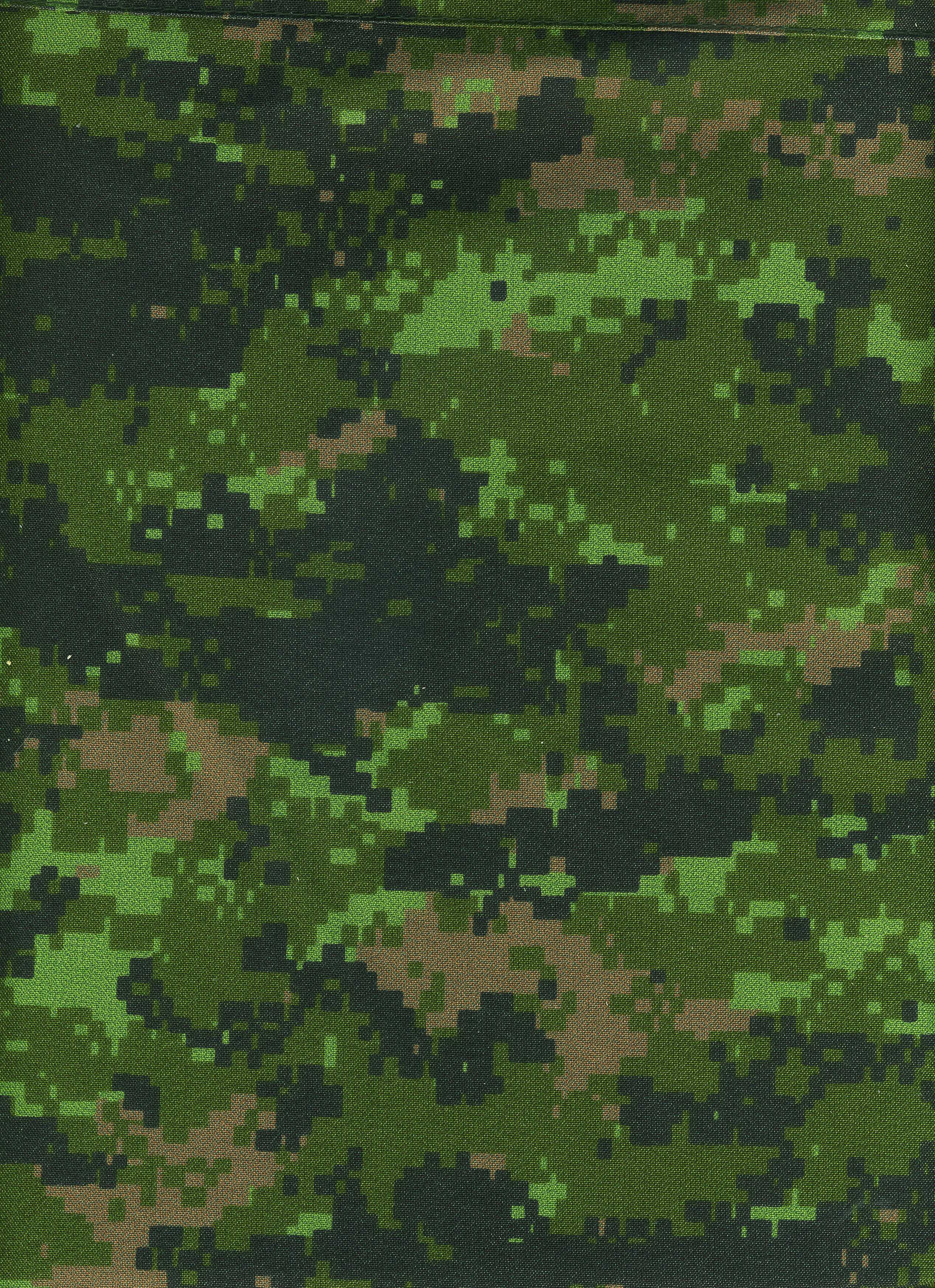
O'Neill designed Dual-Tex, the first digital military camouflage pattern; this paved the way for others to design patterns such as CADPAT (illustrated, the first such pattern to enter service, in 2002) and MARPAT, using the same principles.

In 1976, O'Neill created a pixelated pattern named "Dual-Tex". He called the digital approach "texture match". The initial work was done by hand on a retired M113 armored personnel carrier at the Aberdeen Proving Ground in Maryland; O'Neill painted the pattern on with a 2-inch (5.1-centimeter) roller, forming squares of color by hand. Field testing showed that the result was good compared to the U.S. Army's existing camouflage patterns. At a distance, the squares merged into a larger pattern, breaking up the vehicle's outline and making it blend into the background of trees. Closer up, the pattern successfully imitated smaller details of the landscape, appearing as leaves, grass tufts, and shadows.

O'Neill was quoted in a report by an American government watchdog, the Special Inspector General for Afghanistan Reconstruction, which was critical of wasteful Pentagon spending. O'Neill is reported as stating of the camouflage pattern then in use: "Desert designs don't work well in woodland areas and woodland patterns perform poorly in the desert." In O'Neill's view, "it is best to tailor the spatial characteristics and color palette of a camouflage pattern to the specific environment and tactical position where those using the camouflage would be inclined to hide."

== Author ==
The Individuated Hobbit: Jung, Tolkien, and the Archetypes of Middle-Earth (1979) is a critical study of the works of J.R.R. Tolkien. Tolkien scholar Thomas Honegger called it "the unsurpassed standard work on the subject" (2019).

O'Neill was the author of two novels. Shades of Gray (1987) is about a West Point psychologist investigating mysterious happenings on campus. Mandala (2014) concerns a mysterious structure in Montana that has psychological and mythic properties.

== Distinctions ==
O'Neill has been called the father of digital camouflage. He featured in the 2015 Australian documentary film Deception by Design.

== Bibliography ==
- 1979 The Individuated Hobbit
- 2013 Shades of Gray (novel)
- 2014 Mandala (novel)
