= The Individuated Hobbit =

1979 book by Timothy R. O'Neill

The Individuated Hobbit: Jung, Tolkien, and the Archetypes of Middle-Earth
- Author: Timothy R. O'Neill
- Genre: Literary criticism
- Publisher: Houghton Mifflin
- Publication date: September 1979
- Pages: 200
- ISBN: 0-395-28208-X
- OCLC: 5007475
- Dewey Decimal: 828/.9/1209
- LC Class: PR6039.O32 Z78

The Individuated Hobbit: Jung, Tolkien, and the Archetypes of Middle-Earth (1979) is a critical study of the works of J.R.R. Tolkien by Timothy R. O'Neill. It is written from a Jungian perspective, with particular emphasis on Jungian archetypes.

== Synopsis ==
In the Preface, O'Neill writes that he was inspired to write this book as a rebuttal against some scholars' attempts to analyze J.R.R. Tolkien’s works from a Freudian lens.

O’Neill uses the first two chapters to explain key concepts of Jungian theory, as well as psychoanalysis and Humanism, to provide readers with a working background knowledge of relevant theories about personality before diving into the contents of Tolkien’s novels.

The next chapters focus on applying the aforementioned theories to prominent fictional characters in Tolkien’s Middle-earth and connecting their personalities with Jungian archetypes. O'Neill argues that numerous characters, such as Frodo Baggins, exhibit the philosophical concept of self-realization. Additionally, he connects Gandalf, Beorn, and Gollum with the archetypes of the Wise Old Man, the Self, and the Shadow, respectively.

The final chapter discusses archetypes in relation to allegory. Although O’Neill acknowledges that Tolkien disliked allegory, he argues that Tolkien was perhaps unintentionally influenced by elements of Jungian theory nevertheless, meaning that allegorical studies of The Lord of the Rings and Tolkien’s other works are not necessarily fruitless.

== Reception ==
The book was called "a compelling and influential Jungian reading" by Christopher Vaccaro, editor of The Body in Tolkien's Legendarium.

The Tolkien scholar Thomas Honegger called it "the unsurpassed standard work on the subject".

== Sources ==
- Honegger, Thomas (2019). "More Light Than Shadow? Jungian Approaches to Tolkien and the Archetypal Image of the Shadow". In Agnoloni, Giovanni (ed.). Tolkien: Light and Shadow. Kipple Officina Libraria. ISBN 978-88-32179-07-1.
- O'Neill, Timothy R. (1979). The Individuated Hobbit: Jung, Tolkien, and the Archetypes of Middle-earth. Houghton Mifflin.
- Vaccaro, Christopher (2013). "The Body in Question". In Christopher Vaccaro (ed.). The Body in Tolkien's Legendarium: Essays on Middle-earth Corporeality. McFarland. ISBN 978-0-7864-7478-3.
