= Tolkien and antiquarianism =

J. R. R. Tolkien's literary approach

Tolkien intended to include many antiquarian-style elements in The Lord of the Rings, including drawings and paintings. This illustration, of the Doors of Durin, was, despite his best efforts, the only one that the publishers included in the first edition.

J. R. R. Tolkien included many elements in his Middle-earth writings, especially The Lord of the Rings, other than narrative text. These include artwork, calligraphy, chronologies, family trees, heraldry, languages, maps, poetry, proverbs, scripts, glossaries, prologues, and annotations. Much of this material is collected in the many appendices. Scholars have stated that the use of these elements places Tolkien in the tradition of English antiquarianism.

Other scholars have discussed why Tolkien spent so much effort on these antiquarian-style elements. Some of the materials suggest that Tolkien was just the editor of real materials that had come into his hands. This applies, for example, to artworks like the found manuscript Book of Mazarbul, and to annals that seem to have been edited and annotated by different people over many years. It applies, too, to Tolkien's frame stories for his writings, including the memoirs of Bilbo and Frodo Baggins in the case of The Lord of the Rings, which supposedly survived as the Red Book of Westmarch. All of these elements together form an editorial frame for the book, placing the author in the role of fictional translator of the surviving ancient text, and helping to make the secondary world of Middle-earth seem real and solid.

== Context ==
J. R. R. Tolkien (1892–1973) was an English Roman Catholic writer, poet, philologist, and academic, best known as the author of the high fantasy works The Hobbit and The Lord of the Rings. He was professionally interested in the ancient Germanic languages, including Gothic and Old Norse. He specialised in Old English, the language of the Anglo-Saxons. He spent much of his career as a professor of medieval English at the University of Oxford. Tolkien stated that whenever he read a medieval work, he wanted to write a modern one in the same tradition.

The Lord of the Rings was published in 1954–55; it won the International Fantasy Award in 1957. The publication of the Ace Books and Ballantine paperbacks in the United States helped it to become immensely popular with a new generation in the 1960s. The book has remained so ever since, ranking as one of the most popular works of fiction of the twentieth century, judged by both sales and reader surveys. In the 2003 "Big Read" survey conducted by the BBC in the United Kingdom, The Lord of the Rings was found to be the "Nation's best-loved book." In similar 2004 polls both Germany and Australia also found The Lord of the Rings to be their favourite book. In a 1999 poll of Amazon.com customers, The Lord of the Rings was judged to be their favourite "book of the millennium." The popularity of The Lord of the Rings increased further when Peter Jackson's film trilogy came out in 2001–2003.

== Tolkien in the English antiquarian tradition ==
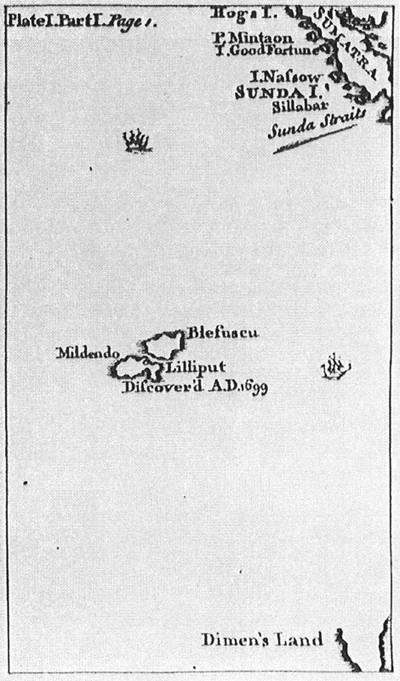
Tolkien was preceded in the use of maps in fiction by Jonathan Swift, who showed Lilliput near Sumatra in his 1726 Gulliver's Travels.

Christina Fawcett writes that by creating his fantasy world of Middle-earth in the way that he did, giving it a history as well as a narrative, Tolkien was following in a tradition that interwove history with literature. She notes that antiquarianism flourished in the 18th century, and that 19th century neo-medieval literature grew out of the Gothic.

Jamie Williamson identifies antiquarianism as an ancestor of modern fantasy. Tolkien was in Williamson's view following earlier authors like William Morris, who in turn was following antiquarians like James Macpherson in the use of devices like a prose style incorporating archaisms and elegy and historical appendices to create a feeling of realism. Carl Phelpstead writes that Tolkien's "prolific creation of the languages, peoples, genealogies, and history that give Middle-earth an unprecedented (and unmatched) sense of reality is calculated to prevent ... disbelief by providing the kind of inner consistency which commands Secondary Belief." Phelpstead states that Tolkien argued against Samuel Taylor Coleridge's description of fiction in his 1817 Biographia Literaria as prompting "willing suspension of disbelief", insisting that the suspension of disbelief was "involuntary" in successful fiction, and that it was "difficult and requires much labor" to achieve this in literature. Phelpstead comments that the "non-narrative aspects of world-building" have largely been overlooked by scholars of literature but are being explored in the less narrowly focused discipline of media studies.

Nick Groom, in A Companion to J. R. R. Tolkien, places Tolkien in the tradition of English antiquarianism, where 18th century authors like Thomas Chatterton wrote in medieval style, creating a variety of non-narrative materials much as Tolkien did. Finding a lack of suitable material, he "invented his own archaic language and calligraphy; produced his own complex medieval manuscripts, maps, sketches, and heraldry; [and] loaded his pseudo-antique writings with prefaces, footnotes, appendices, and glossaries". Björn Sundmark notes that Tolkien was following authors like Jonathan Swift in his use of maps in his fiction. Will Sherwood, writing in Journal of Tolkien Research, comments that these non-narrative elements "will all sound familiar as they are the techniques that [Tolkien] used to immerse readers into Arda [the world that includes Middle-earth]." Andrew Higgins, reviewing Groom's article, comments that Tolkien, like the antiquarians, invented legends and myths, but not simply as fantasy; he and they "felt they were recording a past that was already there".

Nick Groom's analysis of Tolkien's relationship to English antiquarianism
Author	Dates	Artwork	Calligraphy	Heraldry	Maps	Manuscripts	Genealogies	Languages	Paratexts	Songs/poems
Jonathan Swift	1667–1745				yes			yes		
William Stukeley	1687–1765				yes		yes		yes	yes
Thomas Percy	1729–1811								yes	yes
Thomas Chatterton	1752–1770	yes	yes	yes	yes	yes		yes		
William Blake	1757–1827	yes								
J. R. R. Tolkien	1892–1973	yes	yes	yes	yes	yes	yes	yes	yes	yes

The first page from The Book of Mazarbul, a facsimile artefact that Tolkien carefully created in the style of a forgery to support the story and bring readers into his fantasy; he had hoped to include it in the first edition of The Lord of the Rings.

Catherine McIlwaine writes that Tolkien used his pipe to burn the edges of the Book of Mazarbul's pages, "pierced holes along one side to resemble the holes where the parchment would have been stitched to the binding and washed them with red paint to resemble bloodstains". Groom notes that Tolkien was not a "literary forger" like Chatterton, but that his facsimile pages of the Book of Mazarbul "enlist[ed] the aesthetics of antiquarianism" and that he "adopts the techniques of literary forgery". Sherwood adds that these forgery methods were much like Chatterton's ways of making his documents look realistic. The set of forged and invented non-narrative elements took their place alongside the frame story that Bilbo and later Hobbits had edited, transcribed and annotated the text of the ancient Red Book of Westmarch which Tolkien supposedly found and edited as The Lord of the Rings.

Among the English antiquarian authors, writes Groom, were the bishop Thomas Percy, whose 1765 Reliques of Ancient English Poetry contained songs, paratextual devices such as "prefaces, notes, appendices, [and] glossaries", and William Stukeley, who added genealogies and maps to Percy's range of techniques. The satirist Jonathan Swift enjoyed "invented languages, linguistic systems, and spelling reform", and populated Gulliver's Travels with "false maps and pseudonymous authorship", while the poet and artist William Blake filled his written works with "illuminated pages" containing his own artwork. Sherwood argues that Tolkien intentionally set about improving on antiquarian forgery, eventually creating "the codes and conventions of modern fantasy literature".

== Antiquarian elements in Tolkien's writings ==
In antiquarian style, Tolkien created many non-narrative materials. These are both graphic, such as artwork, heraldry, and maps; and textual, such as appendices, footnotes, glossaries, and prefaces.

=== Graphic elements ===
==== Artwork ====
Tolkien's artwork was a key element of his creativity from the time when he began to write fiction. He prepared illustrations for his Middle-earth fantasy books, facsimile artefacts such as the Book of Mazarbul, more or less "picturesque" maps, and calligraphy including the iconic Black Speech inscription on the One Ring. Some of his artworks combined several of these elements to support his fiction.

==== Scripts ====
Tolkien invented several writing systems to accompany his languages, including Cirth, Sarati, and Tengwar. When his publisher invited him to suggest ideas for the dust jackets of the three volumes, he supplied a design using the Ring inscription in Tengwar for the first book. Although this proved too expensive, a simplified version using the inscription was used for all three volumes. For the title page, he drew a top margin incorporating a Cirth script that reads 'THE LORD OF THE RINGS TRANSLATED FROM THE RED BOOK', and a bottom margin in Tengwar, which continues the sentence 'of Westmarch by John Ronald Reuel Tolkien herein is set forth the history of the War of the Ring and the return of the King as seen by the Hobbits'.

Multiple dimensions of artistry: Tolkien used his skill in calligraphy to write the One Ring's iconic inscription, a poem in the Black Speech of Mordor, using the Elvish Tengwar script, both of which he invented.

==== Heraldry ====
Tolkien described heraldic devices for many of the characters and nations of Middle-earth. His descriptions were in simple English rather than in specific blazon. The emblems correspond in nature to their bearers, and their diversity contributes to the richly detailed realism of his writings, lending colour to the characters' backgrounds and personalities. Scholars note that Tolkien went through different phases in his use of heraldry; his early account of the Elvish heraldry of Gondolin in The Book of Lost Tales corresponds broadly to heraldic tradition in the choice of emblems and colours, but that later when he wrote The Lord of the Rings he was freer in his approach, and in the complex use of symbols for Aragorn's sword and banner, he clearly departs from tradition to suit his storytelling.

Depictions of the Heraldry of Middle-earth

Dol Amroth, a port of Gondor

Harad, an enemy state

The evil city of Minas Morgul

The riders of Rohan

==== Maps ====
Tolkien made maps depicting Middle-earth to help him with plot development, to guide the reader through his often complex stories, and to contribute to the impression of depth and realistic worldbuilding in his writings. Shippey comments that the maps contribute an "air of solidity and extent both in space and time which its successors [in 20th century fantasy] so conspicuously lack". He suggests that readers take maps and the names on them as labels with "a very close one-to-one relationship with whatever they label". That in turn makes maps "extraordinarily useful to fantasy", as they constantly assure the reader that the places depicted exist and have history and cultures behind them.

Tolkien stated that he began with maps and developed his plots from them, but that he also wanted his maps to be picturesque. He painstakingly constructed his characters' intersecting movements to get each of them to the right places at the right times. He drew his maps, such as the one of Gondor and Mordor, to scale on graph paper and plotted the protagonists' tracks, annotating these with dates to ensure that the chronology fitted exactly.

Tolkien's design for a contour map on graph paper with handwritten annotations, of parts of Gondor and Mordor and the separate routes taken by Aragorn's army from Minas Tirith to the Morannon (left), and the Hobbits with the One Ring to Mount Doom (right), with dates along those routes, for an enlarged map in The Return of the King

=== Verbal elements ===
==== Chronologies ====
The appendices to The Lord of the Rings contain precisely worked-out chronologies of Middle-earth, supporting the narrative with background detail of many aspects of the nations and characters. Appendix A: "Annals of the Kings and Rulers" gives background to the larger world of Middle-earth, with brief overviews of the events of the first two Ages of the world, and then more detailed histories of the nations of Men in Gondor and Rohan, as well as a history of the royal Dwarvish line of Durin during the Third Age. Appendix B: "The Tale of Years (Chronology of the Westlands)" is a timeline of events throughout The Lord of the Rings, and ancient events affecting the narrative; in lesser detail, it gives the stories' context in the fictional chronology of the larger mythology. Tolkien used the timeline, in conjunction with his maps of Middle-earth, to align the interlaced threads of the narrative as the different characters progress in different directions through the landscape.

From Appendix B: "The Tale of Years (Chronology of the Westlands)"
Year	The Second Age
1	Foundation of the Grey Havens, and of Lindon.
32	The Edain reach Númenor.
c. 40	Many Dwarves leaving their old cities in Ered Luin go to Moria and swell its numbers.
442	Death of Elros Tar-Minyatur.
c. 500	Sauron begins to stir again in Middle-earth.
548	...

==== Genealogies ====
Family trees contribute to the impression of depth and realism in the stories set in his fantasy world by showing that each character is rooted in history with a rich network of relationships. Tolkien included multiple family trees in the appendices to The Lord of the Rings; they are variously for Elves, Dwarves, Hobbits, and Men. The family trees gave Tolkien a way of exploring and developing the etymologies of characters' names, and their genealogical relationships. They imply, too, the fascination of his Hobbit characters with their family history. A further function was to show how aspects of character derive from ancestry.

Bilbo's and Frodo's ancestry analysed by geography of the Shire and Hobbit family character. Bilbo inherits bourgeois Baggins and adventurous Took, suiting him both for life in the Shire and for the adventure described in The Hobbit. Frodo inherits bourgeois Baggins and outlandish Buckland, suiting him for the quest of The Lord of the Rings, but leaving him ultimately unsettled.

==== Languages ====
Tolkien was fascinated by language in his childhood, and professionally interested in it as a philologist. Philology strongly influenced his Middle-earth fantasy world. He constructed languages throughout his life, starting in his teens, describing this as "A Secret Vice". The most developed of his glossopoeic projects was his family of Elvish languages including Quenya and Sindarin. He stated that "I am a philologist and all my work is philological"; he explained to his American publisher Houghton Mifflin that this was meant to imply that his work was "all of a piece, and fundamentally linguistic [sic] in inspiration. ... The invention of languages is the foundation. The 'stories' were made rather to provide a world for the languages than the reverse. To me a name comes first and the story follows."

Untranslated Elvish (Quenya, emphasised) in the narrative
The Hobbits invoke Elbereth

Sam drew out the elven-glass of Galadriel again. As if to do honour to his hardihood, and to grace with splendour his faithful brown hobbit-hand that had done such deeds, the phial blazed forth suddenly, so that all the shadowy court was lit with a dazzling radiance like lightning; but it remained steady and did not pass.
'Gilthoniel, A Elbereth!' Sam cried. For, why he did not know, his thought sprang back suddenly to the Elves in the Shire, and the song that drove away the Black Rider in the trees.
'Aiya elenion ancalima!' cried Frodo once again behind him.
The will of the Watchers was broken with a suddenness like the snapping of a cord, and Frodo and Sam stumbled forward.

Tolkien made "daring" use of untranslated Elvish, as when the Hobbits reach Elrond's house at Rivendell and hear the poem A Elbereth Gilthoniel sung in full: A Elbereth Gilthoniel / silivren penna míriel / o menel aglar elenath! ... The Tolkien scholar Tom Shippey comments that readers were not expected to know the song's literal meaning, but were meant to make something of it: it was clearly something from an unfamiliar language, and it announced that "there is more to Middle-earth than can immediately be communicated".

As well as invented languages, there are untranslated greetings in Old English, such as "'Westu Théoden hál!' cried Éomer". This is a scholarly joke: a dialectal form of Beowulf's Wæs þú, Hróðgár, hál ("Be thou well, Hrothgar!") i.e. Éomer shouts "Long Live King Theoden!" in the accent of ancient Mercia, the part of England where Tolkien grew up.

==== Poetry ====
The poetry in The Lord of the Rings consists of poems and songs interspersed with the novel's prose. The book contains over 60 pieces of verse of many kinds, including for wandering, marching to war, drinking, and having a bath; narrating ancient myths, riddles, prophecies, and magical incantations; of praise and lament (elegy). Some of these forms were found in Old English poetry. Tolkien stated that all his poems and songs were dramatic in function, not seeking to express the poet's emotions, but throwing light on the characters, such as Bilbo Baggins, Sam Gamgee, and Aragorn, who sing or recite them.

Commentators have noted that Tolkien's verse has long been overlooked, and almost never emulated by other fantasy writers; (Note: An exception is Poul and Karen Anderson's 1991 short story "Faith", which ends with two stanzas of "The Wrath of the Fathers, Aeland's epic", written in Old English-style alliterative verse, beginning: Hark! We have heard // of Oric the hunter, Guthlach the great-thewed, // and other goodmen Following far, // fellowship vengeful,) but that since the 1990s it has received scholarly attention. The verse includes light-hearted songs and apparent nonsense, as with those of Tom Bombadil; the poetry of the Shire, which has been said to convey a sense of "mythic timelessness"; and the laments of the Riders of Rohan, which echo the oral tradition of Old English poetry. Scholarly analysis of Tolkien's verse shows that it is both varied and of high technical skill, making use of different metres and rarely used poetic devices to achieve its effects.

Tolkien's elegiac song of Rohan, based on The Wanderer's ubi sunt passage
Lament of the Rohirrim
Where now the horse and the rider?
Where is the horn that was blowing?
Where is the helm and the hauberk,
and the bright hair flowing?
Where is the hand on the harp-string,
and the red fire glowing?
Where is the spring and the harvest
and the tall corn growing?
They have passed like rain on the mountain,
like a wind in the meadow; ...

==== Proverbs ====
The Riddle of Strider

All that is gold does not glitter,
Not all those who wander are lost;
The old that is strong does not wither,
Deep roots are not reached by the frost.

— The Lord of the Rings 1:10 "Strider"

Tolkien uses many proverbs in The Lord of the Rings to create a feeling that the world of Middle-earth is both familiar and solid, and to give a sense of the different cultures of the Hobbits, Men, Elves, and Dwarves who populate it. Scholars have commented that the proverbs are sometimes used directly to portray characters such as Barliman Butterbur, who never has time to collect his thoughts. Further, the proverbs help to convey Tolkien's underlying message about providence; while he keeps his Christianity hidden, readers can see that what appears as luck to the protagonists reflects a higher purpose throughout Tolkien's narrative.

== Editorial framing ==
Tolkien framed his narratives with a mass of paratexts, elements which stand beside the main text, in The Lord of the Rings and some in The Hobbit. The Tolkien scholar Janet Brennan Croft comments that these "resonat[e]" or "collaborat[e]" with the main text to amplify its effect, making it more believable. Tolkien's paratexts include prefaces, notes, and appendices of all kinds; scholars including Croft have stated that his maps, too, serve as paratextual amplifiers of his narratives. The paratexts contribute to constructing an editorial frame for the work. This places him not as author but as the last of a line of philological editors of a surviving ancient manuscript originally written by the hobbits Bilbo and Frodo Baggins, whose memoirs, in the book's frame story, supposedly survived as the Red Book of Westmarch. This in turn placed Tolkien in the role of fictional translator of the surviving ancient text, helping to make the secondary world of Middle-earth seem real and solid.

The editorial frame of The Lord of the Rings, consisting of multiple elements,
both in the main text and around it in the prologue and appendices

Allan Turner writes that Tolkien presents The Lord of the Rings as a pseudotranslation, with a found manuscript conceit in the tradition of Miguel de Cervantes's 1605 epic novel Don Quixote (which was claimed to be a translation from an imagined Arabic author, El Cid Benegali). Tolkien thus placed himself as having come across an ancient document, edited and annotated by many hands. Again, Turner notes, Tolkien had not invented this idea, as Walter Scott had done the same in the introduction to his 1820 novel Ivanhoe.

The literary critic Christine Brooke-Rose describes what Turner calls "the huge metatext" of the Appendices as "[not] in the least necessary to the narrative", granting only that "they have given much infantile happiness to the Tolkien clubs and societies". Turner notes that Shippey directly refutes Brooke-Rose, showing that the mass of detail makes Middle-earth real and solid as each added fact squares with the text and lends it depth. Turner gives two reasons for the importance of the metatext. Firstly, the metatext entirely supports the world of the text, seen from inside the frame where the author is imagined as a translator. Secondly, the Appendices are clearly narrated by an editor, a literary figure who is compiling the whole book from ancient documents. Turner comments that the editor treats the metatext material as real, creating a "wider text-world" than the text itself does. Turner notes that Tolkien stated that this was absolutely necessary: the secondary world has to be presented as vera historia ("true history"), so as not "to defeat the 'magic'".

== See also ==
- Literary devices in The Lord of the Rings
- The Hobbit § Illustration and design

== Sources ==
- Boswell, George W. (1969). "Proverbs and Phraseology in Tolkien's Lord of the Rings Complex". Studies in English. 10. Article 6.
- Brljak, Vladimir (2010). "The Books of Lost Tales: Tolkien as Metafictionist". Tolkien Studies. 7 (1): 1–34. doi:10.1353/tks.0.0079. ISSN 1547-3163.
- Brooke-Rose, Christine (1981). A Rhetoric of the Unreal. Cambridge University Press. ISBN 978-0-5212-2561-8. OCLC 7197513.
- Campbell, Alice (2013) [2007]. "Maps". In Drout, Michael D. C. (ed.). J.R.R. Tolkien Encyclopedia. Routledge. pp. 405–408. ISBN 978-0-415-86511-1.
- Carpenter, Humphrey (1977). J. R. R. Tolkien: A Biography. New York: Ballantine Books. ISBN 978-0-04-928037-3.
- Carpenter, Humphrey, ed. (2023) [1981]. The Letters of J. R. R. Tolkien: Revised and Expanded Edition. New York: HarperCollins. ISBN 978-0-35-865298-4.
- Crabbe, Katharyn (1988) [1981]. J.R.R. Tolkien (Revised ed.). F. Ungar. ISBN 978-0-8044-2106-5. OCLC 7279806.
- Curry, Patrick (2020) [2014]. "The Critical Response to Tolkien's Fiction" (PDF). In Lee, Stuart D. (ed.). A Companion to J. R. R. Tolkien. Wiley Blackwell. pp. 369–388. ISBN 978-1-11965-602-9.
- Fisher, Jason (2013) [2007]. "Family Trees". In Drout, Michael D. C. (ed.). J.R.R. Tolkien Encyclopedia: Scholarship and Critical Assessment. Routledge. pp. 188–189. ISBN 978-0-415-86511-1.
- Flieger, Verlyn (2005). Interrupted Music: The Making of Tolkien's Mythology. Kent State University Press.
- Garth, John (2020). Tolkien's Worlds: The Places That Inspired the Writer's Imagination. Quarto Publishing. ISBN 978-0-7112-4127-5.
- Groom, Nick (2020) [2014]. "The English Literary Tradition: Shakespeare to the Gothic". In Lee, Stuart D. (ed.). A Companion to J. R. R. Tolkien. Wiley Blackwell. pp. 286–302. doi:10.1002/9781118517468.ch20. ISBN 978-1119656029. OCLC 1183854105.
- Hall, Alaric (2005). "Lord of the Rings, Lecture 4: 'Hobbits?' said Théoden. 'Your tongue is strangely changed.'". Alaric Hall. Archived from the original on 31 December 2005.
- Hammond, Wayne G.; Scull, Christina (1995). J. R. R. Tolkien: Artist and Illustrator. London: HarperCollins. ISBN 0-261-10322-9. OCLC 34533659.
- Hammond, Wayne G.; Scull, Christina (2005). The Lord of the Rings: A Reader's Companion. HarperCollins. ISBN 978-0-00-720907-1. OCLC 60667786.
- Holmes, John R. (2013) [2007]. "Art and Illustrations by Tolkien". In Drout, Michael D. C. (ed.). J.R.R. Tolkien Encyclopedia. Routledge. pp. 27–32. ISBN 978-0-415-86511-1.
- Hriban, Catalin (2011). "The Eye and the Tree. The Semantics of Middle-earth Heraldry". Hither Shore. 8: 198–211.
- Kullmann, Thomas (2009). "Intertextual Patterns in JRR Tolkien's The Hobbit and The Lord of the Rings". Nordic Journal of English Studies. 8 (2): 37–56. doi:10.35360/njes.190.
- MacLeod, Jeffrey J.; Smol, Anna (2017). "Visualizing the Word: Tolkien as Artist and Writer". Tolkien Studies. 14 (1): 115–131. doi:10.1353/tks.2017.0009. S2CID 171923300.
- McGregor, Jamie (2013). "Tolkien's Devices: The Herald[r]y of Middle-Earth". Mythlore. 32 (1): 95–112, Article 7.
- McIlwaine, Catherine (2018). Tolkien: Maker of Middle-earth. Bodleian Library. p. 384. ISBN 978-1851244850.
- Phelpstead, Carl (2022) [2014]. "Myth-making, Sub-creation, and World-building". In Lee, Stuart D. (ed.). A Companion to J. R. R. Tolkien. Wiley Blackwell. pp. 65–78. ISBN 978-1119656029. OCLC 1183854105.
- Purdy, Margaret R. (1982). "Symbols of Immortality: A Comparison of European and Elvish Heraldry". Mythlore. 9 (1): 19–22, 36, Article 5.
- Rateliff, John D. (2014). "Inside Literature: Tolkien's Explorations of Medieval Genres". In Houghton, John Wm.; Croft, Janet Brennan; Martsch, Nancy (eds.). Tolkien in the New Century: Essays in Honor of Tom Shippey. McFarland. pp. 133–152. ISBN 978-0-7864-7438-7.
- Rosebury, Brian (2003). Tolkien: A Cultural Phenomenon. Palgrave Macmillan. ISBN 978-0-230-59998-7.
- Shippey, Tom (2001). J. R. R. Tolkien: Author of the Century. HarperCollins. ISBN 978-0261104013.
- Shippey, Tom (2005) [1982]. The Road to Middle-Earth: How J. R. R. Tolkien Created a New Mythology (Third ed.). HarperCollins. ISBN 978-0-261-10275-0.
- Solopova, Elizabeth (2009). Languages, Myths and History: An Introduction to the Linguistic and Literary Background of J. R. R. Tolkien's Fiction. New York City: North Landing Books. ISBN 978-0-9816607-1-4.
- Sundmark, Björn (2017). "Mapping Middle Earth: A Tolkienian Legacy". In Goga, Nina; Kümmerling-Meibauer, Bettina (eds.). Maps and Mapping in Children's Literature: Landscapes, seascapes and cityscapes. John Benjamins Publishing. pp. 221–238. ISBN 978-90-272-6546-3.
- Tolkien, J. R. R. (1954a). The Fellowship of the Ring. The Lord of the Rings. Boston: Houghton Mifflin. OCLC 9552942.
- Tolkien, J. R. R. (1954). The Two Towers. The Lord of the Rings. Boston: Houghton Mifflin. OCLC 1042159111.
- Tolkien, J. R. R. (1955). The Return of the King. The Lord of the Rings. Boston: Houghton Mifflin. OCLC 519647821.
- Tolkien, J. R. R. (1983). The Monsters and the Critics, and Other Essays. London: Allen & Unwin. OCLC 417591085.
- Turner, Allan (2011a). "A Theoretical Model for Tolkien Translation Criticism". In Honegger, Thomas (ed.). Tolkien in Translation. Cormarë series. Vol. 4. Zurich: Walking Tree Publishers. pp. 1–30. ISBN 978-3-9521424-6-2.
