= Editorial framing of The Lord of the Rings =

Literary device in Tolkien's fiction

J. R. R. Tolkien decided to increase the reader's feeling that the story in his 1954–55 book The Lord of the Rings was real, by framing the main text with an elaborate editorial apparatus that extends and comments upon it. This material, mainly in the book's appendices, effectively includes a fictional editorial figure much like himself who is interested in philology, and who says he is translating a manuscript which has somehow come into his hands, having somehow survived the thousands of years since the Third Age. He called the book a heroic romance, giving it a medieval feeling, and describing its time-frame as the remote past. Among the steps he took to make its setting, Middle-earth, believable were to develop its geography, history, peoples, genealogies, and unseen background (later published as The Silmarillion) in great detail, complete with editorial commentary in each case.

Tolkien considered giving his legendarium, including the character Elendil, an external frame in the form of a time travel novel. A character whose name, like Elendil's, means "Elf-friend", was to visit different historic periods, arriving at last in Númenor; but he never completed such a novel, despite two attempts.

The book was given a genuine editorial frame after Tolkien's death by his son Christopher Tolkien, who successively published The Silmarillion. Unfinished Tales, and eventually the 12 volumes of The History of Middle-earth. That set includes 4 volumes of The History of The Lord of the Rings. Christopher Tolkien provided detailed editorial commentary on the development of the stories of the whole legendarium and of The Lord of the Rings as a mass of contradictory drafts in manuscript.

Peter Jackson's Lord of the Rings film trilogy reframed the work as the tale of a dangerous adventure, omitting characters like Tom Bombadil and chapters like "The Scouring of the Shire" which deviated from Jackson's primary narrative, the quest to destroy the One Ring. The films attracted an enormous new audience, familiar with other media such as video games. Together, fans, game authors, and fantasy artists created a large body of work in many media, including a mass of fan fiction, novels, fan films, and artwork. Tolkien's impact on fantasy, principally through this one book, has been enormous; fantasy novelists have had the choice of either imitating Tolkien or of reacting against him. Scholars too turned their attention to book and films. These diverse contributions in many media provide a new, much wider context that frames and comments upon The Lord of the Rings.

Scholars including Vladimir Brljak have remarked Tolkien's construction of an editorial frame within the book. Brljak argues that this framework, with its pseudo-editorial, pseudo-philological, and pseudo-translational aspects, "is both the cornerstone and crowning achievement of Tolkien's mature literary work".

== Context ==
J. R. R. Tolkien was an English author and philologist of ancient Germanic languages, specialising in Old English; he spent much of his career as a professor at the University of Oxford. He is best known for his novels about his invented Middle-earth, The Hobbit and The Lord of the Rings, and for the posthumously published The Silmarillion which provides a more mythical narrative about earlier ages. A devout Roman Catholic, he described The Lord of the Rings as "a fundamentally religious and Catholic work", rich in Christian symbolism. (Note: Carpenter 2023, letter 142 to Robert Murray, 2 December 1953)

== Frame embedded in the book ==
=== Frame story ===
A frame story is a tale that encloses or frames the main story or set of stories. For example, in Mary Shelley's 1818 novel Frankenstein, the main story is framed by a fictional correspondence between an explorer and his sister, so as to present the story as if it were real.

Tolkien used frame stories in his Middle-earth writings to make the works resemble a genuine mythology, accumulated over a long period of time. He described in detail how his fictional characters Bilbo and Frodo Baggins wrote their memoirs and transmitted them to others, and showed how later in-universe editors annotated the material. In The Lord of the Rings, the characters directly discuss the story, i.e. Tolkien has embedded the narrative's frame story in the narrative.

Tolkien accompanied the embedded frame story with a found manuscript conceit, pretending that he had had the luck to come across an ancient manuscript of the Red Book of Westmarch which had somehow survived over the thousands of years since the end of the Third Age. With this device, Tolkien could put a figure of himself inside the book, appearing as the voice of a philological editor and translator making comments in the appendices. In Appendix F II "On Translation", this figure explains how and why he has approached the task of making the ancient text intelligible to the modern reader.

=== Multiple levels ===
The scholar of literature Allan Turner comments that elements of the frame story function at multiple levels; in particular, metatextual elements like the appendices "[treat] the world of the story as historical fact, at the same time [creating] for the reader the illusion of a direct link through time and space with his/her own world through the persona of the 'editor'". For example:

Tolkien impersonates an editor writing factual explanatory notes on a historical text (Note: Tolkien 1955, Appendix F II, "On Translation")
Note on three names: Hobbit, Gamgee, and Brandywine
Hobbit is an invention. In the Westron the word used, when this people was referred to at all, was banakil 'halfling'. But at this date the folk of the Shire and of Bree used the word kuduk, which was not found elsewhere. Meriadoc, however, actually records that the King of Rohan used the word kûd-dúkan 'hole-dweller'. Since, as has been noted, the Hobbits had once spoken a language closely related to that of the Rohirrim, it seems likely that kuduk was a worn-down form of kûd-dúkan. The latter I have translated, for reasons explained, by holbytla; and hobbit provides a word that might well be a worn-down form of holbytla, if that name had occurred in our own ancient language. ...

All of this paints a picture of the author as editor and (pseudo-)translator, the text as a survival through long ages, and the events depicted as historical: In his introduction to Unfinished Tales, Christopher Tolkien described his father's imagined role as the "persona ... of the translator and redactor". (Note: Tolkien 1980, "Introduction", p. 3) He made a similar point about the legendarium in his foreword to The Silmarillion: "my father came to conceive the Silmarillion as a compilation ... made long afterwards ..." (Note: Tolkien 1977, "Foreword") In a letter sent while he was writing The Lord of the Rings, Tolkien wrote "I always had the sense of recording what was already 'there' somewhere: not of inventing." (Note: Carpenter 2023, #131 to Milton Waldman, late 1951)

Catherine Butler comments that this was "congenial work" which "suited the philological Tolkien with his many medieval documents". One aspect of that congeniality is that it allowed documents to be inconsistent with each other: different editors had different opinions, and tales could be told from many points of view. A major instance that troubled Tolkien was in The Hobbit, where Bilbo claimed in the first edition (1937) that Gollum had freely given him the ring. Seen from The Lord of the Rings, where the ring had become the One Ring, so powerful as to corrupt anyone who wore it for any substantial length of time, Bilbo's claim was clearly a lie: Gollum was totally addicted to the One Ring, and quite unable to give it up. Tolkien altered the second edition (1951) of The Hobbit so as to be more consistent with the forthcoming The Lord of the Rings, but that meant that there were conflicting versions in the two editions. But once Tolkien realized there could be inconsistent versions of Bilbo's claim, he could say simply that Bilbo lied so as to reinforce his claim on the item, making himself more comfortable psychologically.

Found manuscript and pseudotranslation supporting Tolkien's frame story
Time	Events	Notes
Third Age	The quest of Erebor; Bilbo Baggins writes his memoirs in Westron. War of the Ring	Pseudo-history conceit The Hobbit; Further pseudo-history
Fourth Age	Frodo Baggins writes his memoirs in Westron. Others annotate the memoirs: the Red Book of Westmarch.	The Lord of the Rings; Found manuscript conceit
Fifth Age	... more editing by more hands ...	Pseudo-editor conceit
Sixth/Seventh Age	The Tolkien 'editor' "translates" the found manuscript into English (and a little Old Norse and Old English)	Pseudo-translator conceit

=== Multiple elements ===
The Lord of the Rings has a complex structure, with many elements in antiquarian style besides the main text. These form a frame which expands upon the text, comments upon it, and helps to make it convincingly realistic. Among these elements, Thomas Kullmann writes that the prologue "obviously imitates the non-fictional prose of nineteenth- and early twentieth-century ethnography" with its discussion of how "Hobbits are an unobtrusive but very ancient people..." and details of their habitual activities. Further, the "Notes on Shire Records" imitate "works of historiography", while the appendices offer tables of what look like "historic data and linguistic notes."

Tolkien commented on this metatextual process in one of his letters, writing that "It is, I suppose, fundamentally concerned with the problem of the relation of Art (and sub-creation) and Primary Reality". (Note: Carpenter 2023, #131 to Milton Waldman, late 1951, footnote)

The Lord of the Rings as a framed text

Vladimir Brljak notes Tolkien's praise of Beowulf in his lecture "Beowulf: The Monsters and the Critics", and cites Shippey's comment that Tolkien "felt a virtual identity of motive and of technique" with the Beowulf poet. That affinity, he writes, extended to creating an impression of depth, giving the feeling of "unattainable vistas" stretching back into the past. It also meant intentionally creating the feeling of receiving "an echo of an echo" (as Tolkien said in his lecture) by creating "an intricate metafictional structure". Brljak argues that this framework "is both the cornerstone and crowning achievement of Tolkien's mature literary work", and that the pseudo-editorial, pseudo-philological, and pseudo-translational apparatus contributes greatly to the effect.

== Time travel novel as an external frame ==
The Lord of the Rings was preceded in Tolkien's writings by two unfinished time-travel novels, The Lost Road, begun in 1936–37, and The Notion Club Papers, begun c. 1945. Both texts make use of variants of the character Ælfwine to provide a frame story for the time travel. Further, his name, and that of other incarnations of the same character, means "Elf-friend", tying him to Elendil in Tolkien's legendarium. Indeed, the time travellers successively approach Númenor, making the novels into frames for the legendarium itself. Verlyn Flieger comments that had either The Lost Road or The Notion Club Papers been finished,

We would have had a dream of time-travel through actual history and recorded myth which would have functioned as both introduction and epilogue to Tolkien's own invented mythology. The result would have been time-travel not on the scale of ordinary science fiction but of epic, a dream of myth and history and fiction interlocking as Tolkien wanted them to, as they might well once have done.

Time-travelling frame story characters with the periods they visit
Period	Second Age Over 9,000 years ago	Lombards (568–774)	Anglo-Saxons (c. 450–1066)	England 20th century	
Language of names	Quenya (in Númenor)	Germanic	Old English	Modern English	Meaning of names
Character 1	Elendil	Alboin	Ælfwine	Alwin	Elf-friend
Character 2	Herendil	Audoin	Eadwine	Edwin	Bliss-friend
Character 3	Valandil ("Valar-friend")	———	Oswine	Oswin, cf. Oswald	God-friend

== An external editorial frame ==
When The Lord of the Rings was first published in the 1950s, Tolkien as the book's author was the only person who had actually edited the many drafts of the text or commented upon them, let alone of the large legendarium which lay behind the text and supplied the material for its impression of depth, its pseudo-historical frame. This changed after his death in 1973, when his son Christopher Tolkien redacted the legendarium to create a much shorter version of it, The Silmarillion. That led to the publication of further stories, starting with the 1980 Unfinished Tales, and eventually to the 12 volumes of The History of Middle-earth. That set includes 4 volumes of The History of The Lord of the Rings. Christopher Tolkien provided detailed editorial commentary on the development of the stories of the whole legendarium, the Silmarillion writ large, and of The Lord of the Rings as a mass of contradictory drafts in manuscript.

In 1984, Christopher Tolkien, reflecting on his construction of the published text of The Silmarillion, wrote the following note, regretting that he had not provided it with a "framework ... within the imagined world" explaining how it might have come into existence in Middle-earth and survived to become the book that the reader sees: (Note: Tolkien 1984, "Foreword")

by its posthumous publication nearly a quarter of a century later the natural order of presentation of the whole 'Matter of Middle-earth' was inverted; and it is certainly debatable whether it was wise to publish in 1977 a version of the primary 'legendarium' standing on its own and claiming, as it were, to be self-explanatory. The published work has no 'framework', no suggestion of what it is and how (within the imagined world) it came to be. This I now think to have been an error.

The scholar Gergely Nagy observes that Tolkien "thought of his works as texts within the fictional world" (his emphasis), and that the overlapping of different and sometimes contradictory accounts was central to his desired effect. Nagy notes that Tolkien went so far as to create facsimile pages from the Dwarves' Book of Mazarbul that is found by the Fellowship in Moria. Further, Tolkien was a philologist; Nagy comments that Tolkien may have been intentionally imitating the philological style of Elias Lönnrot, compiler of the Finnish epic, the Kalevala; or of St Jerome, Snorri Sturlusson, Jacob Grimm, or Nikolai Grundtvig, all of whom Tolkien saw as exemplars of a professional and creative philology. This was, Nagy believes, what Tolkien thought essential if he was to present a mythology for England, since such a thing had to have been written by many hands. Further, writes Nagy, Christopher Tolkien "inserted himself in the functional place of Bilbo" as editor and collator, in his view "reinforcing the mythopoeic effect" that his father had wanted to achieve, making the published book do what Bilbo's book was meant to do, and so unintentionally realising his father's intention. Tolkien's Middle-earth writings had become, in reality and no longer only in fiction, a complex work by different hands edited, annotated, and commented upon over a long period.

Christopher Tolkien's editorial framing of the 12 volumes of The History of Middle-earth presents his father's legendarium, and the books derived from it, as a set of historic texts, analogous to the presentation of genuine scholarly works like The Monsters and The Critics; and it creates a narrative voice throughout the series, a figure of Christopher Tolkien himself.

== Reframing by many hands ==
=== Peter Jackson ===
In 2001–2003, Peter Jackson's Lord of the Rings film trilogy appeared on cinema screens. Jackson took great care to create a visually-convincing Middle-earth setting, with admired cinematography, sets, miniatures, costumes, prosthetics, weapons and armour made by Wētā Workshop, and the CGI creation of the monster Gollum. All this attracted much critical admiration. The film's production design was based on the artwork of the leading Tolkien artists John Howe and Alan Lee, who were employed for long periods in New Zealand to support the production of the films. Howard Shore's music for the series, too, was widely praised. The result was to make the films look familiar, and indeed in Kristin Thompson's words "readers ... often claimed that the film had captured their own mental images of Middle-earth".

Jackson, with a background in horror films, and the need to attract a large audience, necessarily cut the story down to fit the viewing time of three films. He chose to focus on the story as a dangerous adventure, omitting characters such as Tom Bombadil who did not forward the narrative, and chapters such as "The Scouring of the Shire" which deviate from Jackson's primary narrative, the quest to destroy the One Ring.

The films were extremely successful commercially, attracting both existing Tolkien readers and creating a new, younger audience familiar with other media such as video games. Tolkien scholars were divided in their opinions of the films. A few felt that the spirit of the book had been lost, the text eviscerated. Some noted that characters had been flattened out into basic types or caricatures. Others felt that the book's qualities had been preserved by appropriate substitution of cinematic techniques for Tolkien's prose. And some, along with many fans, saw the films as representing the book well.

=== Fans, novelists, game authors, artists ===
The Lord of the Rings, both as a book and as a film series, has inspired the creation of a large number of works in many media. Tolkien's impact on fantasy, principally through this one book, has been enormous. It unquestionably created "fantasy" as a marketing category. Tolkien has been called the "father" of modern fantasy, or more specifically of high fantasy. The result was an outpouring of novels, games, fan fiction, and fantasy artwork all based on, imitative of, or reacting against Tolkien: a wider frame created by many hands using a diverse range of media. The author and editor of Journal of the Fantastic in the Arts, Brian Attebery, writes that fantasy is defined "not by boundaries but by a centre", which is The Lord of the Rings.

Editorial framing of The Lord of the Rings has proceeded from Tolkien's fictional editor who supposedly translated the Red Book of Westmarch, to his son Christopher who genuinely edited the many draft manuscripts for the book, to Peter Jackson's films which radically revised the story and its focus, and on to a mass of materials by many hands in a wide variety of media.

The Catholic author Mark Shea wrote a mock work of philological scholarship, set in the distant future, looking back at the works attributed to Tolkien and to Peter Jackson. Shea states that "Experts in source-criticism now know that The Lord of the Rings is a redaction of sources ranging from The Red Book of Westmarch (W) to Elvish Chronicles (E) to Gondorian records (G) to orally transmitted tales of the Rohirrim (R)", each with "their own agendas", like "the 'Tolkien' (T) and 'Peter Jackson' (PJ) redactors". He notes confidently that "we may be quite certain that 'Tolkien' (if he ever existed) did not write this work in the conventional sense, but that it was assembled over a long period of time ..."

== Sources ==
- Artamonova, Maria (2010). "Writing for an Anglo-Saxon audience in the twentieth century: J.R.R. Tolkien's Old English Chronicles". In Clark, David; Perkins, Nicholas (eds.). Anglo-Saxon Culture and the Modern Imagination. Cambridge: D. S. Brewer. pp. 71–88.
- Brljak, Vladimir (2010). "The Books of Lost Tales: Tolkien as Metafictionist". Tolkien Studies. 7 (1): 1–34. doi:10.1353/tks.0.0079. ISSN 1547-3163.
- Burdge, Anthony S.; Burke, Jessica (2011b) [2004]. "Humiliated Heroes: Peter Jackson's Interpretation of The Lord of the Rings". In Honegger, Thomas (ed.). Translating Tolkien: Text and Film. Cormarë series. Vol. 6. Walking Tree Publishers. pp. 129–155. ISBN 978-3-9521424-9-3.
- Butler, Catherine (2013). "Tolkien and Worldbuilding". In Hunt, Peter (ed.). J. R. R. Tolkien: The Hobbit and The Lord of the Rings. Palgrave Macmillan. pp. 106–120. ISBN 978-1-137-26399-5.
- Carpenter, Humphrey (1977). J. R. R. Tolkien: A Biography. New York: Ballantine Books. ISBN 978-0-04-928037-3.
- Carpenter, Humphrey, ed. (2023) [1981]. The Letters of J. R. R. Tolkien: Revised and Expanded Edition. New York: HarperCollins. ISBN 978-0-35-865298-4.
- Ferré, Vincent (2022). "The Son Behind the Father: Christopher Tolkien as a Writer". In Ovenden, Richard; McIlwaine, Catherine (eds.). The Great Tales Never End: Essays in Memory of Christopher Tolkien. Bodleian Library Publishing. pp. 53–69. ISBN 978-1-8512-4565-9.
- Flieger, Verlyn (1983). Splintered Light: Logos and Language in Tolkien's World. Grand Rapids, Michigan: William B. Eerdmans Publishing Company. ISBN 978-0-8028-1955-0.
- Flieger, Verlyn (2000). "The Footsteps of Ælfwine". In Flieger, Verlyn; Hostetter, Carl F. (eds.). Tolkien's Legendarium: Essays on The History of Middle-earth. Westport: Greenwood Press. pp. 183–198.
- Flieger, Verlyn (2005). Interrupted Music: The Making of Tolkien's Mythology. Kent State University Press.
- Harvey, Kate (2013). "From Illustration to Film: Visual Narratives and Target Audiences". In Hunt, Peter (ed.). J. R. R. Tolkien: The Hobbit and The Lord of the Rings. Palgrave Macmillan. ISBN 978-1-137-26399-5.
- Honegger, Thomas (2013) [2007]. "Ælfwine (Old English "Elf-friend")". In Drout, Michael D. C. (ed.). J. R. R. Tolkien Encyclopedia. Oxford: Taylor & Francis. pp. 4–5.
- Kullmann, Thomas (2009). "Intertextual Patterns in JRR Tolkien's The Hobbit and The Lord of the Rings". Nordic Journal of English Studies. 8 (2): 37–56. doi:10.35360/njes.190.
- Nagy, Gergely (2020) [2014]. "The Silmarillion: Tolkien's Theory of Myth, Text, and Culture". In Lee, Stuart D. (ed.). A Companion to J. R. R. Tolkien. John Wiley & Sons. pp. 107–118. ISBN 978-1-119-65602-9.
- Shippey, Tom (2005) [1982]. The Road to Middle-Earth: How J. R. R. Tolkien Created a New Mythology (Third ed.). HarperCollins. ISBN 978-0-261-10275-0.
- Tolkien, J. R. R. (1955). The Return of the King. The Lord of the Rings. Boston: Houghton Mifflin. OCLC 519647821.
- Tolkien, J. R. R. (1977). Christopher Tolkien (ed.). The Silmarillion. Boston: Houghton Mifflin. ISBN 978-0-395-25730-2.
- Tolkien, J. R. R. (1980). Christopher Tolkien (ed.). Unfinished Tales. Boston: Houghton Mifflin. ISBN 978-0-395-29917-3.
- Tolkien, J. R. R. (1984). Christopher Tolkien (ed.). The Book of Lost Tales. Vol. 1. Boston: Houghton Mifflin. ISBN 0-395-35439-0.
- Turner, Allan (2011a). "A Theoretical Model for Tolkien Translation Criticism". In Honegger, Thomas (ed.). Tolkien in Translation. Cormarë series. Vol. 4. Zurich: Walking Tree Publishers. pp. 1–30. ISBN 978-3-9521424-6-2.
