= Tolkien's frame stories =

Literary device in Tolkien's fiction

J. R. R. Tolkien used frame stories throughout his Middle-earth writings, especially his legendarium, to make the works resemble a genuine mythology written and edited by many hands over a long period of time. He described in detail how his fictional characters wrote their books and transmitted them to others, and showed how later in-universe editors annotated the material.

The frame story for both Tolkien's novels published in his lifetime, The Hobbit and The Lord of the Rings, is that the eponymous Hobbit Bilbo Baggins wrote a memoir of his adventures; it became The Red Book of Westmarch. This was continued by his relative Frodo Baggins, who carried the One Ring to Mount Doom, and then by Frodo's servant, Samwise Gamgee, who had accompanied him. The Lord of the Rings contains an appendix, "The Tale of Aragorn and Arwen", which, being written by Men rather than Hobbits, has its own frame story.

The legendarium, the body of writing behind the posthumously-published The Silmarillion, has a frame story that evolved over Tolkien's long writing career. It centred on a character, Aelfwine the mariner, whose name, like those of several later reincarnations of the frame-characters, means "Elf-friend". He sails the seas and is shipwrecked on an island where the Elves narrate their tales to him. The legendarium contains two incomplete time-travel novels, The Lost Road and The Notion Club Papers, which are framed by various "Elf-friend" characters who by dream or other means visit earlier ages, step by step all the way back to the ancient, Atlantis-like lost civilisation of Númenor.

Tolkien was influenced by William Morris's use of a frame story in his 1868–1870 epic poem The Earthly Paradise, in which mariners of Norway set sail for the mythical place, where they hear and narrate tales, one of them of a wanderer much like Eärendil. Tolkien was familiar, too, with the Celtic Imram sea-voyage legends such as those of St Brendan, who returned to tell many stories, and published a poem called "Imram" from his legendarium.

Eventually, Tolkien gave the book not just a frame story, but an elaborate editorial frame of prologue and appendices that together imply the survival of a manuscript through the thousands of years since the end of the Third Age, along with the editing and annotation of that manuscript by many hands. This placed Tolkien in the congenial role for a philologist of having to "translate" the ancient languages used in the manuscript.

== Context ==
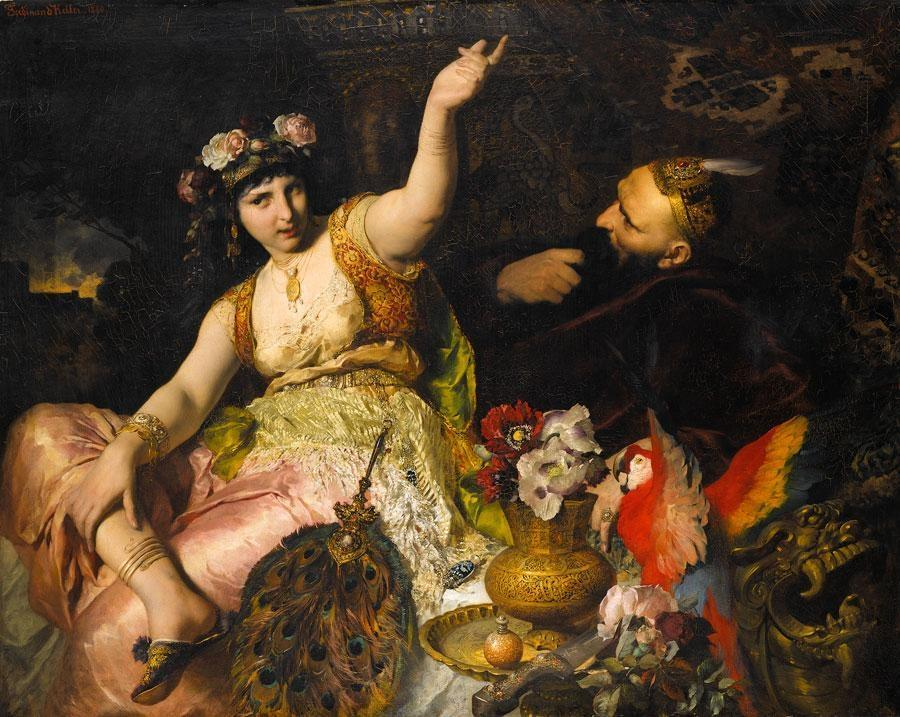
Tolkien was following in a long tradition by framing his stories in another tale explaining how they were told. That tradition includes One Thousand and One Nights, where Scheherazade kept the king entertained with one story after another. Painting by Ferdinand Keller, 1880

=== Frame stories ===
A frame story is a tale that encloses or frames the main story or set of stories. For example, in Mary Shelley's 1818 novel Frankenstein, the main story is framed by a fictional correspondence between an explorer and his sister; in One Thousand and One Nights, compiled during the Islamic Golden Age, the many stories are framed by a tale that Scheherazade keeps the king from executing her by telling him a story every night, each time not completing the story by daybreak so that he spares her life for just one more day.

== The Hobbit and The Lord of the Rings ==
=== Red Book of Westmarch ===
In the last chapter of The Hobbit, Tolkien writes of the protagonist and titular character Bilbo Baggins returning from the journey to the Lonely Mountain and composing his memoirs, to record the events described in the book. Bilbo thinks of calling his work There and Back Again, A Hobbit's Holiday. (Note: Tolkien 1937, "The Last Stage") Tolkien's full name for the novel is indeed The Hobbit or There and Back Again. (Note: Tolkien 1937, Title page) In the first chapter of The Lord of the Rings, Bilbo's There and Back Again tale is said to be written in his red leather-bound diary. (Note: Tolkien 1954a, "A Long-expected Party") While living in Rivendell, Bilbo expands his memoirs into a record of the events of The Lord of the Rings, including the exploits of his kinsman Frodo Baggins and others. He leaves the material for Frodo to complete and organize. (Note: Tolkien 1955 "Many Partings") Frodo writes down the bulk of the final work, using Bilbo's diary and "many pages of loose notes". At the close of Tolkien's main narrative, the work is almost complete, and Frodo leaves the task to his gardener and close friend and heir Samwise Gamgee. (Note: Tolkien 1955, "The Grey Havens")

Detail of the runes that provide a frame story in Tolkien's 1937 dust jacket painting for The Hobbit. The runes here shown running horizontally read in English "journey made by Bilbo Baggins of Hob[biton]".

The Tolkien scholar Verlyn Flieger writes that Tolkien, seeking to present his Middle-earth writings as a credible mythology, needed to create a "credible book tradition". He went to "elaborate lengths" to achieve this, including many mentions of Bilbo's "diary" and "Translations from the Elvish", supposedly created during his years of retirement, complete with "the masses of notes and paper in his room at Rivendell". She observes that the simulated tradition is already in evidence, hidden in plain sight, in The Hobbit, whose dust jacket is "surreptitiously" ornamented by Tolkien with ancient-looking runes, which read:

The Hobbit or There and Back Again, being the record of a year's journey made by Bilbo Baggins of Hobbiton; compiled from his memoirs by JRR Tolkien, and published by George Allen and Unwin Ltd.

Flieger notes that The Hobbit's frame story is rather fragile, since the book's narrator often speaks in a voice that cannot be Bilbo's. In The Lord of the Rings, on the other hand, Tolkien carefully embedded the frame story in the text, from the earliest drafts. He has Bilbo talk in the Council of Elrond about getting on with his book, saying that he was "just writing an ending for it", but realising that it now needed "several more chapters" because of Frodo's adventures on the way to Rivendell. (Note: Tolkien 1954a, "The Council of Elrond") She comments that Tolkien "went so far as to draw up a title page" for his Red Book, showing Bilbo's "largely unsatisfactory tries" at finding an appropriate title. The final title is Frodo's:

~~My Diary.~~ ~~My Unexpected Journey.~~ ~~There and Back Again. And~~
~~What Happened After.~~
~~Adventures of Five Hobbits.~~ ~~The Tale of the Great Ring, compiled by~~
~~Bilbo Baggins from his own observations and the accounts of his friends.~~
~~What we did in the War of the Ring.~~

THE DOWNFALL
OF THE
LORD OF THE RINGS
AND THE
RETURN OF THE KING

(as seen by the Little People; being the memoirs of Bilbo and
Frodo of the Shire, supplemented by the accounts of their friends
and the learning of the Wise.)

Together with extracts from Books of Lore translated by Bilbo
in Rivendell.

Flieger writes that at the time of the release of the first edition of The Lord of the Rings in 1954, Tolkien had not yet included that text in the Red Book; its prologue spoke of The Hobbit as containing "a selection from the Red Book of Westmarch". Tolkien went on developing the frame story, and in the second edition he added a "Note on the Shire Records" to the prologue. It explains, in the voice of the fictional editor, that the "account" (the main text of The Lord of the Rings) was taken mainly from the Red Book of Westmarch, stating that this was begun as "Bilbo's private diary", continued by Frodo with an account of the War of the Ring, and extended by Sam.

Near the end of the main text, Tolkien has Frodo give the Red Book to Sam. Flieger notes that, seeing it, Sam says "Why, you have nearly finished it, Mr. Frodo!", and describes Frodo's answer as "both definitive and revealing": "'I have quite finished, Sam', said Frodo. 'The last pages are for you.'" She comments that where Sam says "it", meaning the book, Frodo does not, leaving open whether he means the book or his life in Middle-earth as he has recorded in the book. She briefly considers what Sam might have been supposed to have added, if the suggestion is to be taken at all seriously. She points out that they could have been books 4 and 6 of The Lord of the Rings, where Frodo is never seen without Sam, but there are times when Sam is alert while Frodo is absent or unconscious. Further, no other observer was present, especially at Mount Doom where Sam is the only person who sees Gollum fighting an invisible Frodo for the Ring.

The medieval poem Beowulf contains a passage about a scop reciting the tale of the hero Beowulf. Illustration by Joseph Ratcliffe Skelton, c. 1909

Flieger observes that on the stairs of the dangerous pass of Cirith Ungol, Frodo and Sam talk about what a story is. Sam says "We're in one, of course, but I mean put into words, you know ... read out of a great big book with red and black letters". Frodo answers "Why Sam ... to hear you somehow makes me as merry as if the story were already written". Flieger writes that this is "the most self-referential and post-modern moment in the entire book", since it constitutes the book itself looking both back at its own creation, and forward to the printed book that the reader is holding. She compares this with a passage that Tolkien certainly knew, lines 867–874 of Beowulf, where the scop who is reciting the poem sings of a poet singing about Beowulf. In her view, Sam's "put into words, you know" is a deliberate echo of Beowulf's "glorying in words".

Beowulf's self-referential account of Anglo-Saxon artistry in story-telling
Beowulf 867–874

... Hwīlum cyninges þegn,
guma gilphlæden, gidda gemyndig,
se ðe ealfela ealdgesegena
worn gemunde —word oþer fand
soðe gebunden— secg eft ongan
sið Bēowulfes snyttrum styrian,
ond on sped wrecan spel gerade,
wordum wrixlan; ...

Roy Liuzza's translation

At times the king's thane,
full of grand stories, mindful of songs,
who remembered much, a great many
of the old tales, found other words
truly bound together; he began again
to recite with skill the adventure of Beowulf,
adeptly tell an apt tale,
and weave his words.

Bilbo writing his memoirs titled There and Back Again in Peter Jackson's The Fellowship of the Ring, at that stage representing Tolkien's book The Hobbit

Peter Jackson chose to continue the use of the frame story of Bilbo's memoirs in his film adaptations. In his 2001 The Fellowship of the Ring, Bilbo's There and Back Again provided the basis for the voiceover for the scene "Concerning Hobbits"; this was greatly extended in the Special Extended Edition. The memoirs' title became the working title for the third of Jackson's The Hobbit Films in August 2012, but in 2014 he changed it to The Hobbit: The Battle of the Five Armies.

=== "The Tale of Aragorn and Arwen" ===
The Lord of the Rings contains a second frame story, for the appendix "The Tale of Aragorn and Arwen". The tale describes how the hero Aragorn came to marry an immortal Elf-woman, Arwen. Tolkien stated that it was "really essential" to the work. Its frame story is that the tale was written by Faramir and Éowyn's grandson Barahir after Aragorn's death, and that an abbreviated version of the tale was included in a copy of the Thain's Book made by Findegil. This in turn was annotated, corrected, and extended in Minas Tirith. (Note: Tolkien 1955, "Prologue: Note on the Shire Records") The narrative voice and the story's point of view are examined by the scholar Christine Barkley, who considers the main part of the tale to have been narrated by Aragorn. (Note: The scholar Helen Armstrong examines the implications of Arwen's being one of the narrators of the tale after Aragorn's death.)

=== Paratexts ===
Tolkien included a mass of paratexts – prefaces, notes, and appendices of all kinds – in The Lord of the Rings, and some in The Hobbit. The Tolkien scholar Janet Brennan Croft comments that these "resonat[e]" or "collaborat[e]" with the main text to amplify its effect, making it more believable. Several of these contribute to his frame stories, which place him not as author but as the last of a line of philological editors of ancient documents originally written by characters such as the Hobbits Bilbo and Frodo Baggins. These paratexts thus support a found manuscript conceit, which in turn supports the frame story. The Tolkien scholar Giuseppe Pezzini writes that the "meta-textual frame [of The Lord of the Rings] ... is duly harmonised in the text through the use of formal features; the appendixes are indeed full of scribal glosses, later notes, and editorial references that are meant to match the elaborate textual history detailed in the Note on the Shire Records." For example:

Tolkien's representation of historical editing of ancient documents in the appendices to The Lord of the Rings
	Material in the appendix	Comments
	Appendix A. II "The House of Eorl". The Kings of the Mark. Third Line.	Annalistic heading
2991—F.A. 63 (3084)	Éomer Éadig. When still young he became a Marshal of the Mark (3017) and was given his father's charge in the east marches. In the War of the Ring Théodred fell in battle with Saruman at the Crossings of Isen. Therefore before he died on the Fields of the Pelennor, Théoden named Éomer his heir and called him king. In that day Éowyn also won renown, for she fought in that battle, riding in disguise; and was known after in the Mark as the Lady of the Shield-arm.^{1}	Annalistic dates and text recording great events of the past
^{1} For her shield-arm was broken by the mace of the Witch-king; but he was brought to nothing, and thus the words of Glorfindel long before to King Eärnur were fulfilled, that the Witch-king would not fall by the hand of man. For it is said in the songs of the Mark that in this deed Éowyn had the aid of Théoden's esquire, and that he also was not a Man but a Halfling out of a far country, though Éomer gave him honour in the Mark and the name of Holdwine.		Later editor's footnote
[This Holdwine was none other than Meriadoc the Magnificent who was Master of Buckland.]		Scribal gloss

== Tolkien's legendarium ==
Tolkien thought of his legendarium, the large body of documents of many kinds that lies behind the text of the 1977 book The Silmarillion, as a presented collection, with a frame story that changed over the years, first with an Ælfwine-type character who translates the "Golden Book" of the sages Rumil or Pengoloð; later, having the Hobbit Bilbo Baggins collect the stories into the Red Book of Westmarch, translating mythological Elvish documents in Rivendell.

=== Ælfwine ===
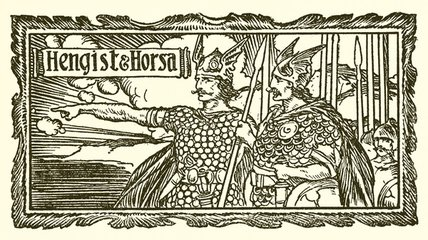
The brothers Hengest and Horsa are the legendary founders of England; in The Book of Lost Tales, Tolkien places Ælfwine as their father. Illustration from Edward Parrott's 1909 Pageant of British History

In The Book of Lost Tales, begun early in Tolkien's writing career, the character who becomes Ælfwine the mariner is named Ottor Wǽfre (called Eriol by the Elves), and his tale serves as frame story for the tales of the Elves. He sets out from what is today Heligoland on a voyage with a small crew, but is the lone survivor after his ship crashes upon the rocks near an island. The island is inhabited by an old man who gives him directions to Eressëa. After he finds the island, the Elves host him in the Cottage of Lost Play and narrate their tales to him. He afterwards learns from them that the old man he met was actually "Ylmir". He is taught most of the tales by the old Elf Rúmil, Eressëa's lore master. (Note: Tolkien 1984b, p. 103)

In these early versions, Tol Eressea is seen as the island of Britain. He earned the name Ælfwine from the Elves; his first wife, Cwén, was the mother of Hengest and Horsa; his second wife, Naimi, bore him a third son, Heorrenda, a great poet of half-Elven descent, who in the fiction would go on to write the Old English epic poem Beowulf. This weaves together a mythology for England, connecting England's geography, poetry and mythology with the Legendarium as a plausibly reconstructed (though probably untrue) prehistory.

=== The Book of Lost Tales ===
The first title for The Book of Lost Tales, begun in 1917, framed its stories as a transmitted collection:

The Golden Book of Heorrenda
being the book of the
Tales of Tavrobel (Note: Tolkien 1984b, p. 290)

In the fiction, a series of named Elves (Note: See the "Storyteller" column in the table in the article on The Book of Lost Tales.) told the "lost tales" to Eriol/Ælfwine. He transmitted them via Heorrenda's written book. As edited by Christopher Tolkien, the 1983 Book of Lost Tales, Volume 1 is inscribed:

This is the first part of the Book of the Lost Tales of Elfinesse which Eriol the Mariner learned from the Elves of Tol Eressëa, the Lonely Isle in the western ocean, and afterwards wrote in the Golden Book of Tavrobel. Herein are told the Tales of Valinor, from the Music of the Ainur to the Exile of the Noldoli and the Hiding of Valinor. (Note: Tolkien 1984, Title page)

=== Two incomplete time-travel novels: The Lost Road and The Notion Club Papers ===
Tolkien attempted to write two time-travel novels, but never completed either of them. Both can be seen as frame stories for his legendarium, as the father-son pair of time travellers in each of the novels successively approach the ancient period of the downfall of Númenor. He began The Lost Road in 1937, writing four chapters before setting it aside. He returned to the theme with The Notion Club Papers, which he began and abandoned between 1944 and 1946. In its frame story, a Mr. Green finds documents in sacks of waste paper at Oxford in 2012. These documents, the Notion Club Papers of the title, are the incomplete notes of meetings of the Notion Club; these meetings are said to have occurred in the 1980s. During these meetings, Alwin Arundel Lowdham discusses his lucid dreams about Númenor, a lost civilisation connected with Atlantis and with Tolkien's Middle-earth. Through these dreams, he "discovers" much about the Númenor story and the languages of Middle-earth (notably Quenya, Sindarin, and Adûnaic). While not finished, at the end of the given story it becomes clear that Alwin Lowdham himself is a reincarnation of sorts of Elendil. Tolkien selected the names of these characters (in both novels) to indicate their affinity: Alwin is another form of the Old English name "Aelfwine", meaning "Elf-friend", while the Quenya name Elendil can carry the same meaning.

Time-travelling frame story characters with the periods they visit
Period	Second Age Over 9,000 years ago	Lombards (568–774)	Anglo-Saxons (c. 450–1066)	England 20th century	
Language of names	Quenya (in Númenor)	Germanic	Old English	Modern English	Meaning of names
Character 1	Elendil	Alboin	Ælfwine	Alwin	Elf-friend
Character 2	Herendil	Audoin	Eadwine	Edwin	Bliss-friend
Character 3	Valandil ("Valar-friend")	———	Oswine	Oswin, cf. Oswald	God-friend

== Analysis ==
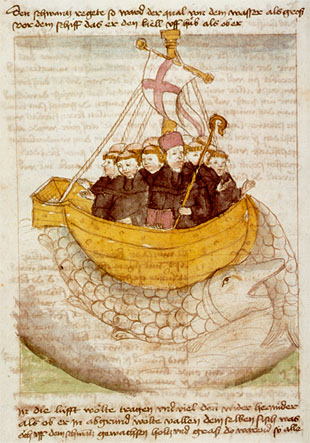
Tolkien's frame stories began as a mariner's sea-voyages, encountering strange lands. One of the types of story influencing these was the Celtic Imram legend, such as of the voyages of St Brendan, shown here in a 15th-century manuscript.

Anna Vaninskaya, in Blackwell's 2014 A Companion to J. R. R. Tolkien, notes that Tolkien was directly influenced by William Morris. She suggests that the legendarium's frame story, starting from the travels of Ælfwine the mariner, was modelled on Morris's 1868–1870 epic poem The Earthly Paradise, whose frame story is that "mariners of Norway, having ... heard of the Earthly Paradise, set sail to find it". She notes that Morris's "wanderers" reach "A nameless city in a distant sea / White as the changing walls of faërie", where they hear and narrate legends including "The Land East of the Sun and West of the Moon"; Tolkien's Lost Tales II contains one of the legendarium's foundation-poems that similarly describes the "Wanderer" Earendel (forerunner of Tolkien's Eärendil), who sails "West of the Moon, east of the Sun". (Note: The phrase "East of the Sun and West of the Moon" is used in fairy-stories and similar tales to refer to another world that is fantastically difficult to reach – in this case Aman, which can only be reached by the Straight Road. An example of the use of this phrase is in the fairy tale "East of the Sun and West of the Moon". See also Tolkien's use of this phrase in a late variant of his 'The Road Goes Ever On' walking songs.)

Tolkien's biographer John Garth, in the same volume, writes that in 1920, Tolkien revised his frame story so that the Lonely Isle was no longer equated with England, and Eriol became the Anglo-Saxon Ælfwine; this began the process of revising the legendarium that continued throughout his life. He notes that in 1945 and 1946, Tolkien added The Notion Club Papers, visiting ancient Númenor by travelling in time rather than by ship, but with a poem about St Brendan's Imram sea-voyages that he revised as the 1955 "Imram".

The Tolkien scholar Jane Chance describes the 1920 version of the Ælfwine story as "Tolkien's complicated penultimate version of the pseudo-historical and Anglo-Saxon frame-story", calling it important to any understanding of "Middle-earth's kernel mythology".

Dale Nelson, in The J. R. R. Tolkien Encyclopedia, writes that Tolkien and his friend C. S. Lewis admired David Lindsay's A Voyage to Arcturus, but that Tolkien "regretted" the science fiction style frame story machinery that Lindsay had used – the back-rays and the crystal torpedo ship; he notes that in The Notion Club Papers, Tolkien makes one of the protagonists, Guildford, criticise those kinds of "contraptions".

== Beyond the frame story: editorial framing of The Lord of the Rings ==
In The Lord of the Rings, Tolkien ultimately went much further than simply embedding a frame story in the text, though he did that too. Instead, he constructed an elaborate editorial frame, including a prologue and an extensive set of appendices, all designed to give the impression that the text had not only survived the thousands of years since the end of the Third Age, but had in that long period been annotated and edited by many hands. The scholar Vladimir Brljak argues that this framework, with its pseudo-editorial, pseudo-philological, and pseudo-translational aspects, "is both the cornerstone and crowning achievement of Tolkien's mature literary work".

Found manuscript and pseudotranslation supporting Tolkien's frame story
Time	Events	Notes
Third Age	The quest of Erebor; Bilbo Baggins writes his memoirs in Westron. War of the Ring	Pseudo-history conceit The Hobbit; Further pseudo-history
Fourth Age	Frodo Baggins writes his memoirs in Westron. Others annotate the memoirs: the Red Book of Westmarch.	The Lord of the Rings; Found manuscript conceit
Fifth Age	... more editing by more hands ...	Pseudo-editor conceit
Sixth/Seventh Age	The Tolkien 'editor' "translates" the found manuscript into English (and a little Old Norse and Old English)	Pseudo-translator conceit: Appendices

== Sources ==
- Flieger, Verlyn (1983). Splintered Light: Logos and Language in Tolkien's World. Grand Rapids, Michigan: William B. Eerdmans Publishing Company. ISBN 978-0-8028-1955-0.
- Flieger, Verlyn (2001). A Question of Time: J. R. R. Tolkien's Road to Faėriė. Kent State University Press. ISBN 978-0-87338-699-9.
- Flieger, Verlyn (2005). Interrupted Music: The Making of Tolkien's Mythology. Kent State University Press.
- Lee, Stuart D., ed. (2020) [2014]. A Companion to J. R. R. Tolkien. Wiley Blackwell. ISBN 978-1119656029.
- Liuzza, Roy M. (2013) [2000]. Beowulf: facing page translation (2nd ed.). Peterborough, Ontario: Broadview Press. ISBN 978-1554811137.
- Shippey, Tom (2005) [1982]. The Road to Middle-Earth: How J. R. R. Tolkien Created a New Mythology (Third ed.). HarperCollins. ISBN 978-0-261-10275-0.
- Tolkien, J. R. R. (1937). The Hobbit. United Kingdom: George Allen & Unwin.
- Tolkien, J. R. R. (1954a). The Fellowship of the Ring. The Lord of the Rings. Boston: Houghton Mifflin. OCLC 9552942.
- Tolkien, J. R. R. (1955). The Return of the King. The Lord of the Rings. Boston: Houghton Mifflin. OCLC 519647821.
- Tolkien, J. R. R. (1984). Christopher Tolkien (ed.). The Book of Lost Tales. Vol. 1. Boston: Houghton Mifflin. ISBN 0-395-35439-0.
- Tolkien, J. R. R. (1984b). Christopher Tolkien (ed.). The Book of Lost Tales. Vol. 2. Boston: Houghton Mifflin. ISBN 0-395-36614-3.
- Turner, Allan (2011a). "A Theoretical Model for Tolkien Translation Criticism". In Honegger, Thomas (ed.). Tolkien in Translation. Cormarë series. Vol. 4. Zurich: Walking Tree Publishers. pp. 1–30. ISBN 978-3-9521424-6-2.
