= Adûnaic =

Fictional language in the fantasy works of J. R. R. Tolkien

- Created by: J. R. R. Tolkien
- Setting and usage: Fantasy world of Middle-earth
- Purpose: constructed languages: artistic languages; fictional languages; languages of Arda; Adûnaic
- Sources: a priori language, but related to other languages of Arda

Language codes
- ISO 639-3: None (mis)
- Glottolog: None
- IETF: art-x-adunaic

Adûnaic (or Númenórean) ("language of the West") is one of the fictional languages devised by J. R. R. Tolkien for his fantasy works.

One of the languages of Arda in Tolkien's Middle-earth legendarium, Adûnaic was spoken by the Men of Númenor during the Second Age. By the time of the War of the Ring at the end of the Third Age, it had developed into the common speech or Westron.

== Fictional history ==
Adûnaic was invented by the first Men as they awoke in Hildórien. It was the language of Númenor, and after its destruction in the Akallabêth, the "native speech" of the people of Elendil in the kingdoms of Arnor and Gondor in the west of Middle-earth, though they usually spoke the Elvish language Sindarin. By the time of the War of the Ring, it had developed into the common speech or Westron. Tolkien called Adûnaic "the language of the culturally and politically influential Númenóreans."

== Concept and creation ==
Although Tolkien created very few original words in Adûnaic, mostly names, the language serves his concept as the ancestor of a lingua franca for Middle-earth, Westron, a shared language for many different peoples.

Tolkien devised Adûnaic (or Númenórean), the language spoken in Númenor, shortly after World War II, and thus at about the time he completed The Lord of the Rings, but before he wrote the linguistic background information of the Appendices. Adûnaic is intended as the language from which Westron (also called Adûni) is derived. This added a depth of historical development to the Mannish languages. Adûnaic was intended to have a "faintly Semitic flavour". Its development began with his 1945 work The Notion Club Papers. It is there that the most extensive sample of the language is found, revealed to one of the (modern-day) protagonists, Lowdham, in a visionary dream of Atlantis. Its grammar is sketched in the unfinished "Lowdham's Report on the Adunaic Language", included in Sauron Defeated.

Tolkien remained undecided whether the language of the Men of Númenor should be derived from the original Mannish language (as in Adûnaic), or if it should be derived from "the Elvish Noldorin" (i.e. Quenya) instead. In The Lost Road and Other Writings it is implied that the Númenóreans spoke Quenya, and that Sauron, hating all things Elvish, taught the Númenóreans the old Mannish tongue they themselves had forgotten.

== Phonology ==
The phonology is as follows:

	Labial	Dental	Alveolar	Palatal	Velar	Glottal
Occlusive	p b		t d		k ɡ	
Fricative	f	θ	s z		x	h
Nasal	m		n		ŋ	
Trill			r			
Approximant			l	j	w	

	Front	Back
Close	i iː	u uː
Close-mid	eː^{1}	oː^{1}
Open	a aː	

^{1}Adûnaic is fundamentally a three-vowel language, with a length distinction; the long eː and oː are derived from diphthongs aj and aw, as is the case in Hebrew and in most Arabic dialects, in line with the Semitic flavour that Tolkien intended for both Adûnaic and Khuzdul, which influenced it.

== Grammar ==
Most information about Adûnaic grammar comes from an incomplete typescript Lowdham's Report on the Adûnaic Language, written by Tolkien to accompany The Notion Club Papers. The report discusses phonology and morphological processes in some detail, and starts to discuss nouns, but breaks off before saying much about verbs, other parts of speech or the grammar as a whole. It appears that Tolkien abandoned work on the language after writing this portion of the Report, and never returned to it.

=== Nouns ===
Most Adûnaic nouns are triconsonantal, but there are a number of biconsonantal nouns as well. Nouns can be divided into three declensions, called Strong I, Strong II and Weak. The two strong declensions form their various cases by modifying the last vowel, similarly to English man/men. The weak declension forms its cases by appending a suffix.

There are three numbers, singular, plural and dual. Dual is used mainly for "natural pairs", like eyes and shoes. There are three cases, Normal, Subjective and Objective. The Subjective case is used as the subject of a verb. The Objective case is used only in compound expressions and appears only in the singular. The Normal case is used in all other circumstances, such as the object of a verb.

Example declensions:

	Strong I	Strong II	Weak
Meaning	house	sea	strength
Singular Normal	zadan	azra	abār
Singular Subjective	zadān	azrā	abārā
Singular Objective	zadun	azru	abāru
Dual Normal	zadnat	azrāt, azrat	abārat
Dual Subjective	zadnāt	azrāt	abārāt
Plural Normal	zadīn	azrī	abārī
Plural Subjective	zadīna	azrīya	abārīya

== Sample text ==
This Adûnaic text, part of the tale of the Fall of Númenor, appears in The Notion Club Papers. It is fragmentary because it appeared in a dream to Tolkien's frame story character Lowdham, and is only partially translated by him because he did not know the language. Words in bold are not translated at the point in the text where the translation is first given, but their translation is given later in the story.

Kadō zigūrun zabathān unakkha ... ēruhīnim
{and so} Sauron humbled he-came ... {Children of God}

dubdam ugru-dalad ... ar-pharazōnun azaggara
fell shadow-under ... Ar-Pharazon {was warring}

avalōiyada ... bārim an-adūn yurahtam dāira
{against Powers} ... Lords of-West broke Earth

sāibēth-mā ēruvō ... azrīya du-phursā akhāsada
assent-with God-from ... seas so-as-to-gush {into chasm}

... anadūnē zīrān hikallaba ... bawība dulgī
... Numenor beloved {she-fell down} ... winds black

... balīk hazad an-nimruzīr azūlada
... ships seven of-Elendil eastward

Agannālō burōda nēnud ... zāira nēnud
Death-shadow heavy on-us ... longing on-us

... adūn izindi batān tāidō ayadda: īdō kātha batīna lōkhī
... west straight road once went now all roads crooked

Ēphalak īdō Yōzāyan
{far away} {now (is)} Land-of-Gift

Ēphal ēphalak īdō hi-Akallabēth
far {far away} {now (is)} She-that-hath-fallen
