= Sound and language in Middle-earth =

Theme in Tolkien's fiction

J. R. R. Tolkien was both a philologist and an author of high fantasy. He had a private theory that the sound of words was directly connected to their meaning, and that certain sounds were inherently beautiful. Scholars believe he intentionally chose words and names in his constructed Middle-earth languages to create feelings such as of beauty, longing, and strangeness. Tolkien stated that he wrote his stories to provide a setting for his languages, rather than the other way around. Tolkien constructed languages for the Elves to sound pleasant, and the Black Speech of the evil land of Mordor to sound harsh; poetry suitable for various peoples of his invented world of Middle-earth; and many place-names, chosen to convey the nature of each region. The theory is individual, but it was in the context of literary and artistic movements such as Vorticism, and earlier nonsense verse that stressed language and the sound of words, even when the words were apparently nonsense.

== Context ==
=== Author ===
As well as being an author of high fantasy, J. R. R. Tolkien was a professional philologist, a scholar of comparative and historical linguistics. He was an expert in Old English and related languages. He remarked to the poet and The New York Times book reviewer Harvey Breit that "I am a philologist and all my work is philological"; he explained to his American publisher Houghton Mifflin that this was meant to imply that his work was "all of a piece, and fundamentally linguistic [sic] in inspiration. ... The invention of languages is the foundation. The 'stories' were made rather to provide a world for the languages than the reverse. To me a name comes first and the story follows." Human sub-creation, in Tolkien's view, to some extent mirrors divine creation as thought and sound together bring into being a new world.

=== Artistic and literary movements ===
Early 20th century movements like Italian Futurism stressed language and the sound of words. Gino Severini's 1912 Dynamic Hieroglyphic of the Bal Tabarin (detail shown) incorporates words like "Bowling" and "POLKA" in its imagery.

The Tolkien scholar Dimitra Fimi notes that around 1900 there were multiple artistic and literary movements that stressed language and the sound of words, and the possibility of conveying meaning even with words that were apparently nonsense. These included Italian Futurism, British Vorticism, and the Imagism of the poet Ezra Pound. Fimi further observes that in the late 19th century, nonsense poets such as Lewis Carroll with his Jabberwocky and Edward Lear sought to convey meaning using invented words.

== Tolkien's "linguistic heresy" ==
=== An aesthetic pleasure ===
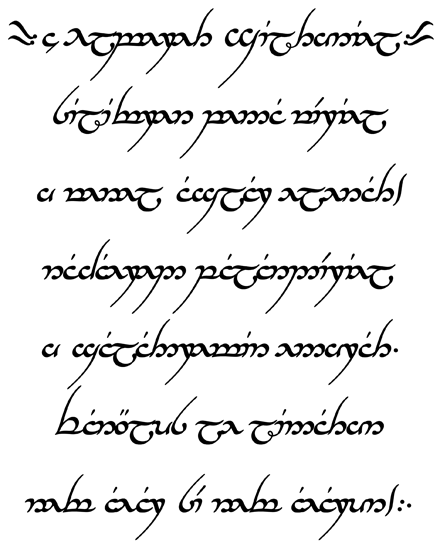
Untranslated, but still appreciated: the long version of "A Elbereth Gilthoniel," written in Tolkien's Tengwar script

The linguist Allan Turner writes that "the sound pattern of a language was the source of a special aesthetic pleasure" for Tolkien. In his essay about constructing languages, "A Secret Vice", Tolkien wrote that

The communication factor has been very powerful in directing the development of language; but the more individual and personal factor—pleasure in articulate sound, and in the symbolic use of it, independent of communication though constantly in fact entangled with it – must not be forgotten for a moment." (Note: Tolkien 1983, p. 208)

Tolkien explained in the essay that the person inventing a language must address the "fitting of notion to oral symbol", and that the pleasure in such invention derives mainly from the "contemplation of the relation between sound and notion". He went so far as to state that he was "personally more interested perhaps in word-form in itself, and in word-form in relation to meaning (so-called phonetic fitness) than in any other department". (Note: Tolkien 1983, pp. 206, 211)

The Tolkien scholar Tom Shippey notes that in The Fellowship of the Ring, the poem A Elbereth Gilthoniel, written in Sindarin, one of Tolkien's invented Elvish languages, is presented directly without translation:

A Elbereth Gilthoniel
silivren penna míriel
o menel aglar elenath!
Na-chaered palan-díriel
o galadhremmin ennorath,
Fanuilos, le linnathon
nef aear, sí nef aearon! (Note: Tolkien 1954a, book 2, ch. 1 "Many Meetings")

Placenames of Bree-land, with the villages of Bree, Combe, Staddle, and Archet in the Chetwood. The names are English, with British (Celtic) elements.

Shippey asks rhetorically what any reader could be expected to make of that. He answers his own question by stating that Tolkien had a private theory of sound and language. This was that the sound of words was directly connected to their meaning, and that certain sounds were inherently beautiful. He intentionally chose words and names in his constructed Middle-earth languages to create feelings such as of beauty, longing, and strangeness. Shippey gives as one example Tolkien's statement that he had used such names as Bree, Archet, Combe, and Chetwood for the small area, outside the Shire, where Hobbits and Men lived together. Tolkien selected them for their non-English elements so that they would sound "queer", with "a style that we should perhaps vaguely feel to be 'Celtic'".

Shippey calls this "Tolkien's major linguistic heresy". It would work, he explains, if people could recognise different styles in language, somehow sense the depth of history in words, get some degree of meaning just from the sounds of words, and even judge some sound combinations beautiful. Tolkien, he writes, believed that "untranslated elvish would do a job that English could not". Shippey notes, too, that Tolkien is recorded as saying that "cellar door" sounded more beautiful than the word "beautiful"; the phrase had however been admired by others from at least 1903.

=== An unconventional view ===
The bouba/kiki effect shows that across cultures, sounds like "kiki" are linked with sharpness (left) and sounds like "bouba" with roundness (right), i.e. that sound symbolism is widespread.

Tolkien's point of view was a "heresy" because the usual structuralist view of language is that there is no connection between specific sounds and meanings. Thus "pig" denotes an animal in English but "pige" denotes a girl in Danish: the allocation of sounds to meanings in different languages has been taken by linguists to be arbitrary, and it is just an accidental by-product that English people find the sound of "pig" to be hoglike.

Tolkien was somewhat embarrassed by the subject of his linguistic aesthetics, as he was aware of the conventional view, due to Ferdinand de Saussure and from the 1950s strengthened by Noam Chomsky and his generative grammar school, that linguistic signs (such as words) were arbitrary, unrelated to their real-world referents (things, people, places). The Tolkien scholar Ross Smith notes that Tolkien was in fact not the only person who disagreed with the conventional view, "unassailable giants of linguistic theory and philosophy like [Otto] Jespersen and [Roman] Jakobson" among them.

More recently, sound symbolism has been demonstrated to be widespread in natural language. The bouba/kiki effect, for example, describes the cross-cultural association of sounds like "bouba" with roundness and "kiki" with sharpness. Svetlana Popova comments that Tolkien "came very close" to the findings of psycholinguistics including the bouba/kiki effect, and that his ideas of what makes the sound of a language pleasurable agree with David Crystal's findings.

=== True names ===
A specific form of direct association of word and meaning is the true name, the ancient belief that there is a name for a thing or a being that is congruent with it; knowledge of a true name might give one power over that thing or being. Tolkien hints at true names in a few places in his Middle-earth writings. Thus, the Ent or tree-giant Treebeard says in The Two Towers that "Real names tell you the story of the things they belong to in my language", while in The Hobbit, the Wizard Gandalf introduces himself with the statement "I am Gandalf, and Gandalf means me".

In the case of Tom Bombadil, an enigmatic character in The Fellowship of the Ring who always speaks in a singing metre and often sings, Turner comments that "the propositional content of language seems to have been absorbed into the music of the sounds alone". Further, Shippey notes, when Tom Bombadil names something, like the ponies that the Hobbits are riding, "the name sticks – the animals respond to nothing else for the rest of their lives". Smith remarked that the sound of the phrase "Tom Bombadil" itself fits very well with the name's "jolly, rumbustious owner".

== Analysis ==
=== Linguistic geography ===
In Turner's view, Tolkien's "linguistic heresy" explains why he believed that his use of different linguistic choices would allow his readers to feel, without understanding why, the distinct nature of each region of Middle-earth.

Turner's analysis of Tolkien's "linguistic heresy"
Place-names	Linguistic origin	Reader's feeling
Bree, Crickhollow	Welsh (British, Celtic)	Slightly exotic
Hobbiton, Bywater	(Old) English	Familiar
Lothlórien, Gondor	Sindarin/Quenya (Elvish)	Alien

=== Keatsian listening ===
Tolkien described a Keatsian style of listening to poetry and song. Portrait of John Keats by William Hilton, c. 1822

Tolkien allows his characters to listen and appreciate "in highly Keatsian style", enjoying the sound of language, as when the Hobbit Frodo Baggins, recently recovered from his near-fatal wound with the Nazgûl's Morgul-knife, sits dreamily in the safe Elvish haven of Rivendell:

At first the beauty of the melodies and of the interwoven words in elven-tongues, even though he understood them little, held him in a spell, as soon as he began to attend to them. Almost it seemed that the words took shape, and visions of far lands and bright things that he had never yet imagined opened out before him; and the firelit hall became like a golden mist above the seas of foam that sighed upon the margins of the world. Then the enchantment became more and more dreamlike, until he felt that an endless river of swelling gold and silver was flowing over him, too multitudinous for its pattern to be comprehended; it became part of the throbbing air about him, and it drenched and drowned him. Swiftly he sank under its shining weight into a deep realm of sleep.

When the Hobbits meet Gildor and his Elves while walking through the Shire, they get the feeling, as Turner comments, that even though they do not speak Elvish, they "subliminally understand something of the meaning". In The Two Towers, while a party of the Fellowship of the Ring is crossing the grassy plains of Rohan, the immortal Elf Legolas hears Aragorn singing a song in a language he has never heard, and comments "That, I guess, is the language of the Rohirrim ... for it is like to this land itself, rich and rolling in part, and else hard and stern as the mountains. But I cannot guess what it means, save that it is laden with the sadness of Mortal Men". When Gandalf declaims the Rhyme of the Rings in the Black Speech of the evil land of Mordor at the Council of Elrond, his voice becomes "menacing, powerful, harsh as stone" and the Elves cover their ears. When the Dwarf Gimli sings of the Dwarf-King Durin, the gardener Hobbit Sam Gamgee says "I like that! I should like to learn it. In Moria, in Khazad-Dum!" Shippey remarks that Sam's response to the sound of language is "obviously ... a model one".

=== Phonetic fitness of Tolkien's constructed languages ===
The linguist Joanna Podhorodecka examines the lámatyáve, a Quenya term for "phonetic fitness", of Tolkien's constructed languages. She analyses them in terms of Ivan Fonágy's theory of symbolic vocal gestures that convey emotions. She notes that Tolkien's inspiration was "primarily linguistic"; and that he had invented the stories "to provide a world for the languages", which in turn were "agreeable to [his] personal aesthetic". She compares two samples of Elvish (one Sindarin, one Quenya) and one of Black Speech, tabulating the proportions of vowels and consonants. The Black Speech is 63% consonants, compared to the Elvish samples' 52% and 55%. Among other features, the sound /i:/ (like the "i" in "machine") is much rarer in Black Speech than in Elvish, while the sound /u/ (like the "u" in "brute") is much more common. She comments that in aggressive speech, consonants become longer and vowels shorter, so Black Speech sounds harsher. Further, Black Speech contains far more voiced plosives (/b, d, g/) than Elvish, making the sound of the language more violent. Podhorodecka concludes that Tolkien's constructed languages were certainly individual to him, but that their "linguistic patterns resulted from his keen sense of phonetic metaphor", so that the languages subtly contribute to the "aesthetic and axiological aspects of his mythology". She notes, too, that Tolkien commented that in his 'Elven-latin' language Quenya, he chose to include "two other (main) ingredients that happen to give me 'phonaesthetic' pleasure: Finnish and Greek"; and that he gave Sindarin "a linguistic character very like (though not identical with) British-Welsh: because that character is one I find, in some linguistic moods, very attractive; and because it seems to fit the rather 'Celtic' type of legends and stories told of its speakers". (Note: Carpenter 2023, #144 to Naomi Mitchison, 25 April 1954) Christopher Robinson concurs that Tolkien took extreme care to ensure phonetic fitness in his languages, arguing that Tolkien's detailed philological analysis and knowledge of linguistics enabled him to achieve a highly polished result.
