= Pseudotranslation in The Lord of the Rings =

Literary device in Tolkien's fiction

A pseudotranslation is a text written as if it had been translated from a foreign language. J. R. R. Tolkien made use of pseudotranslation in The Lord of the Rings for two reasons: to help resolve the linguistic puzzle he had accidentally created by using real-world languages within his legendarium, and to lend realism by supporting a found manuscript conceit to frame his story.

Effectively, he pretends to be an editor and translator who has received an ancient manuscript, the Red Book of Westmarch, written in Westron, the Common Speech of Middle-earth, annotated and edited by many hands, which he decides to translate into English. The manuscript contains names and words from other languages, some of them related to Westron; he translates those into languages related to English, namely Old English and Old Norse. Tolkien wrote in the text of The Two Towers that Orthanc had two meanings, one in Sindarin and the other, "Cunning Mind", in Rohirric. The latter meaning is the actual sense of the Old English word, making the multiple homonymy and synonymy implausible.

Aspects of the pseudotranslation make actual translation of The Lord of the Rings into other languages a challenge. A specific difficulty is the elaborate relationship between some of the real and invented languages used in the book. Westron is supposedly translated as modern English; this stands in relation to Rohirric, an archaic language, which is represented by Old English, and the language of Dale, translated as Old Norse. The three real languages are related. Thomas Honegger gives possible solutions that begin to handle this in French and German, but suggests that the small amount of Old English is probably best left untranslated.

== Context ==
From his schooldays, J. R. R. Tolkien was, in the words of his biographer John Garth, "effusive about philology"; his schoolfriend Rob Gilson called him "quite a great authority on etymology". Tolkien was a professional philologist, a scholar of comparative and historical linguistics. He was especially familiar with Old English and related languages. He remarked to the poet and The New York Times book reviewer Harvey Breit that "I am a philologist and all my work is philological"; he explained to his American publisher Houghton Mifflin that this was meant to imply that his work was "all of a piece, and fundamentally linguistic in inspiration. ... The invention of languages is the foundation. The 'stories' were made rather to provide a world for the languages than the reverse. To me a name comes first and the story follows." (Note: Carpenter 2023, #165 to Houghton Mifflin, 30 June 1955)

A pseudotranslation is a text written as if it had been translated from a foreign language, even though no foreign language original exists. The practice began in medieval chivalric romance, and was common in 16th-century Spain, in works like the c. 1508 Amadís de Gaula; it was mocked by Cervantes in his 1605 Don Quixote.

== Implementation ==
=== An accidental trap ===
In his 1937 children's book The Hobbit, Tolkien used English as the language of the hobbit protagonist, Bilbo Baggins, and he was able to converse in this language with the other characters. The Dwarves however had names in Old Norse forms. Tolkien took the names of 12 of the 13 dwarves – excluding Balin – that he used in The Hobbit (along with the wizard Gandalf's name) from the Old Norse Völuspá in the Elder Edda. For example, Thorin Oakenshield is the leader of the group of Dwarves. The name "Thorin" (Þorinn) appears in stanza 12, where it is used for a dwarf, while the name "Oakenshield" (Eikinskjaldi) is in stanza 13.

Tolkien borrowed Old Norse Dwarf-names for The Hobbit
Dvergatal

11.... Nár ok Náinn Nípingr, Dáinn
Bívurr, Bávurr, Bömburr, Nóri,
...
12. "Veggr ok Gandalfr, Vindalfr, Þorinn,
Þrár ok Þráinn, Þekkr, Litr ok Vitr,

Translation (borrowed names in bold)

11.... Nar and **Nain**, | Niping, **Dain**,
**Bifur**, **Bofur**, | **Bombur**, **Nori**,
...
12. Vigg and **Gandalf** | Vindalf, **Thorin**,
**Thror** and **Thrain** | Thekk, Lit and Vit,

The use of Norse names was left unexplained in The Hobbit, but when some of the same Dwarves reappeared in The Lord of the Rings, it presented an immediate problem: the Dwarves would have had names in their own language, Khuzdul. Tolkien needed to find a solution that would make names in Norse and Khuzdul – one real language, one invented – coexist.

=== Deciding on pseudotranslation ===
When writing The Lord of the Rings (1954–55), a sequel to The Hobbit, Tolkien came up with the literary device of pseudotranslation, using real languages to "translate" fictional languages. He pretended to have translated the original language Westron into English.

In a 1954 letter, Tolkien stated that the pseudotranslation issue "has given me much thought. It seems seldom regarded by other creators of imaginary worlds, however gifted as narrators (such as Eddison). But then I am a philologist". (Note: Carpenter 2023, #144 to Naomi Mitchison, 25 April 1954) He then stated that "English cannot have been the language of any people of that time", and explained his pseudotranslation process: "What I have, in fact done, is to equate the Westron or wide-spread Common Speech of the Third Age with English; and translate everything, including names such as The Shire, that was in the Westron into English terms".

In Appendix F II "On Translation", Tolkien wrote that "The Westron names were as a rule translations of older names: as Rivendell, Hoarwell, Silverlode, Langstrand". (Note: Tolkien 1955, Appendix F II, "On Translation") He went on to explain why he had done this:

[I wished to preserve] the contrast between a wide-spread language... and the living remains of far older and more reverend tongues. All names if merely transcribed would seem to modern readers equally remote: for instance, if the Elvish name Imladris and the Westron translation Karningul had both been left unchanged.

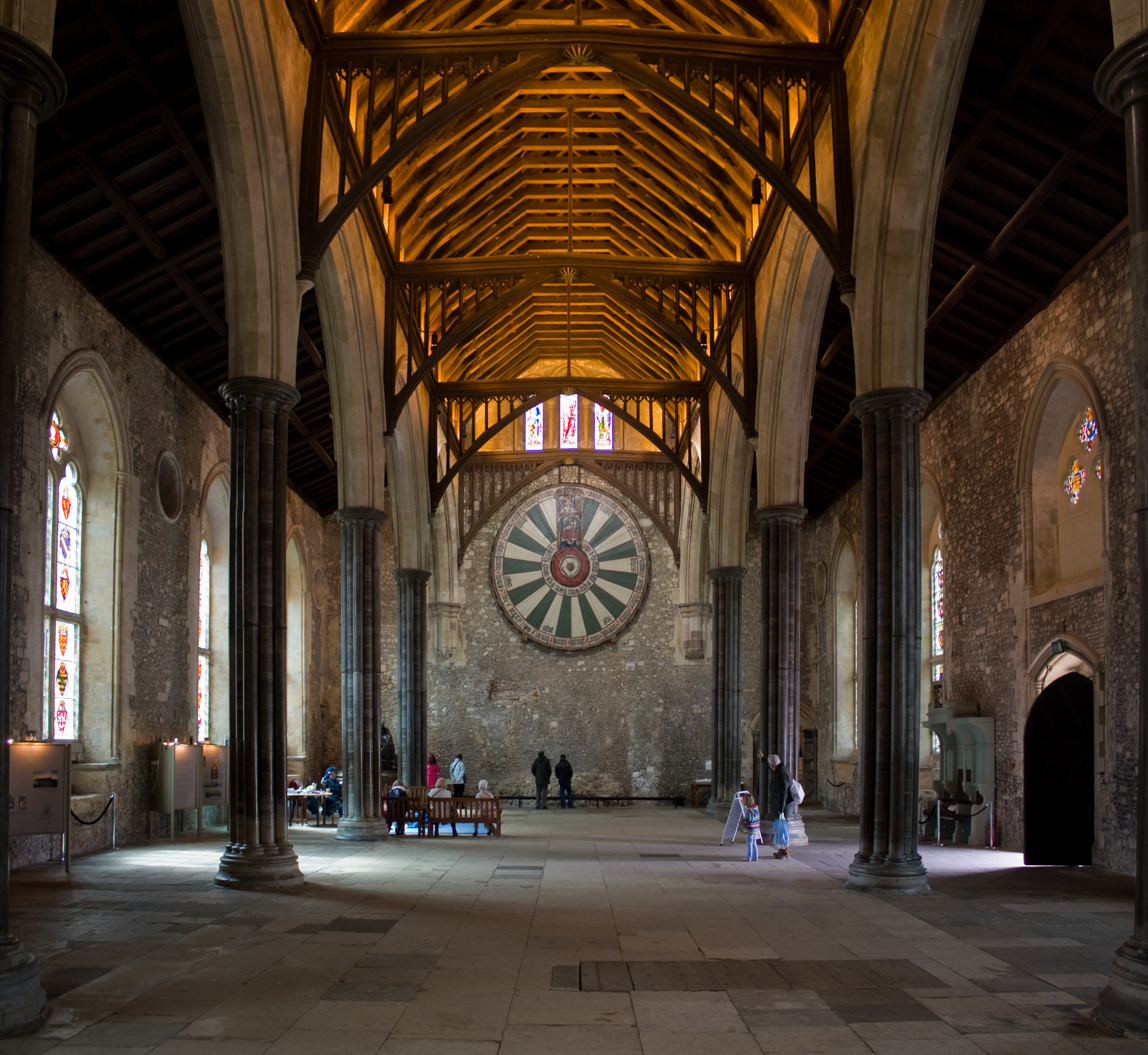
Winchester as Camelot: interior of the Great Hall of Winchester Castle, with what has been claimed to be King Arthur's Round Table

Tolkien gave as a picture of the reason for this approach a sentence mapping Middle-earth to the real world, though with the inclusion of the semi-mythical figure of King Arthur:

But to refer to Rivendell as Imladris was as if one now was to speak of Winchester as Camelot, except that the identity was certain, while in Rivendell there still dwelt a lord of renown far older than Arthur would be, were he still king at Winchester today.

Allan Turner remarks that this further blurs the already confused distinction between fiction and reality:

Turner's analysis of Tolkien's pseudotranslation analogy
Attribute	The Lord of the Rings	Analogy
Place	Rivendell	Winchester
Located in	Fictional Middle-earth	England
In language	English, representing Westron	English
Formerly called	Imladris	Camelot
Former language	Sindarin	Medieval French
In time	An earlier age of Middle-earth	Mythical version of England
Led by	Elrond	King Arthur
Status	A living Elf-lord, who founded the place in the Second Age, thousands of years before the War of the Ring, in the fiction	A long-dead King of men, according to legend

=== Complex implications ===
The device of rendering an imaginary language with a real one was carried further by rendering:

- Rohirric, the language of Rohan (related to Westron) by the Mercian dialect of Old English
- names in the tongue of Dale by Old Norse forms
- names of the Kingdom of Rhovanion by Gothic forms, thus mapping the genetic relation of his fictional languages on to the existing historical relations of the Germanic languages.

Tolkien wrote: "Languages, however, that were related to the Westron presented a special problem. I turned them into forms of speech related to English. Since the Rohirrim are represented as recent comers out of the North, and users of an archaic Mannish language relatively untouched by the influence of Eldarin, I have turned their names into forms like ... Old English."

Tolkien accidentally created a linguistic puzzle by using three different pseudo-translated Germanic languages for peoples in his story.

Furthermore, to parallel the Celtic substratum in England, he used Old Welsh names to render the Dunlendish names of Buckland Hobbits (e.g., Meriadoc for Kalimac). The device of linguistic mapping allowed Tolkien to avoid having to invent new names in Khuzdul for all his Dwarves, while simultaneously explaining the book's use of Modern English for Westron. Further, it saved him from having to work out the details of Westron grammar or vocabulary in any detail. He does give some examples of Westron words in Appendix F II to The Lord of the Rings, where he summarizes its origin and role as Middle-earth's lingua franca:

The language represented in this history by English was the Westron or 'Common Speech' of the West-lands of Middle-earth in the Third Age. In the course of that age it had become the native language of nearly all the speaking-peoples (save the Elves) who dwelt within the bounds of the old kingdoms of Arnor and Gondor ... At the time of the War of the Ring at the end of the age these were still its bounds as a native tongue. (Appendix F)

Rohirric is represented in The Lord of the Rings by Old English because Tolkien chose to make the relationship between Rohirric and the Common Speech similar to that of Old English and Modern English.

Rohirric and Westron

Merry had ridden by himself just behind the king, saying nothing, and trying to understand the slow sonorous speech of Rohan that he heard the men behind him using. It was a language in which there seemed to be many words that he knew, though spoken more richly and strongly than in the Shire, yet he could not piece the words together. At times some Rider would lift up his clear voice in stirring song, and Merry felt his heart leap, though he did not know what it was about.

— "The Muster of Rohan" (Note: Tolkien 1955, Book 5, ch. 3 "The Muster of Rohan")

The mapping of Old English to Modern English is like the mapping of Rohirric to Westron, and Tolkien uses the two Germanic languages to represent the two Middle-earth languages. Further, Tolkien uses Gothic names for the early leaders of the Northmen of Rhovanion, ancestors of Rohan. (Note: Tolkien 1980, p. 311)

Tolkien went further, using Gothic names for the early leaders of the Northmen of Rhovanion, ancestors of Rohan, and for the first Kings of Rohan. Gothic was an East Germanic language, and as such is a forerunner of Old English, not a direct ancestor. Christopher Tolkien suggests that his father intended the correspondence between the language families to extend back to the ancestral language of the Northmen.

Mapping of names of leaders (Note: Tolkien 1955, Appendix A: Annals of the Kings and Rulers, II: The House of Eorl)
Realm	Leader's name	Etymology	Meaning	"Translated from"
Northmen of Rhovanion	Vidugavia	Latinised from Gothic widu, gauja	wood-dweller	(Pre-Rohirric)
Northmen of Rhovanion	Marhwini	Gothic marh, wini	horse-friend	(Pre-Rohirric)
Rohan	Folcwine	Old English folc, winë	folk-friend	Rohirric
Rohan	Éowyn	Old English eo[h], wyn	horse-joy	Rohirric

This solution makes the combination of languages in the book exceptionally complex, presenting a substantial challenge to those translating The Lord of the Rings into other languages. Thomas Honegger suggests how the language nexus might be translated into French:

Honegger's proposal for translating the language nexus into French
Middle-earth language	Language for French translations	Notes
Of the Shire	Modern French	lingua franca spoken across Middle-earth except by "a few secluded folk" as in Lothlórien (and "little and ill by Orcs")
Of Dale	Picard	"used by Dwarves of that region"
Of Rohan	Medieval Vulgar Latin	ancestor of French

Honegger notes that while this type of solution works linguistically, it cannot hope to capture cultural aspects. The people of Rohan, the Rohirrim, speak a Mercian dialect of Old English, and their culture is Anglo-Saxon, despite Tolkien's denial of this in "On Translation". Medieval Latin does nothing to suggest Mercian Anglo-Saxon culture. Honegger suggests that in consequence, the best answer is probably to leave the Old English names and quoted speech untranslated, noting that Tolkien's "Guide to the Names" seems to concur with this approach.

== Lost in translation ==
=== Multiple homonyms ===
Tolkien stated in The Two Towers that the name Orthanc had "by design or chance" two meanings. In Sindarin it meant "Mount Fang", while in the language of Rohan he said it meant "Cunning Mind". (Note: Tolkien 1954, Book 3, chapter 8 "The Road to Isengard") The author Robert Foster notes that orþanc genuinely does mean "cunning" in Old English, so that the homonym Tolkien had in mind was between Sindarin and Old English, that is, translated or represented Rohirric. Foster comments that since it would be unlikely for a homonym also to exist between these two languages and actual Rohirric, and for the Old English and the Rohirric to be synonyms as well, Tolkien had made an error.

In The Two Towers, Tolkien said Orthanc had meanings in Sindarin and Rohirric; but it is also a synonym and homonym in Old English, making Tolkien's claim look like a mistake.

=== Multilingual inscription ===
In The Fellowship of the Ring, the company find Balin's tomb as they cross Moria on their quest. The tomb is inscribed in Dwarf runes. (Note: Tolkien 1954a, Book 2, chapter 5 "The Bridge of Khazad-dûm") Transliterated into Latin characters, this is seen to be in Khuzdul and English. English, as the real-world language into which Westron was purportedly translated, could not exist in Middle-earth. In the related case of the Book of Mazarbul, which was found lying on Balin's tomb, Tolkien admitted that he had made a mistake using English in his facsimile document, "an erroneous extension of the general literary treatment", (Note: Tolkien 1996, pp. 298–299) since the writing was "supposed to be of the date of the events in the narrative".

Languages used in Balin's tomb inscription
Inscription

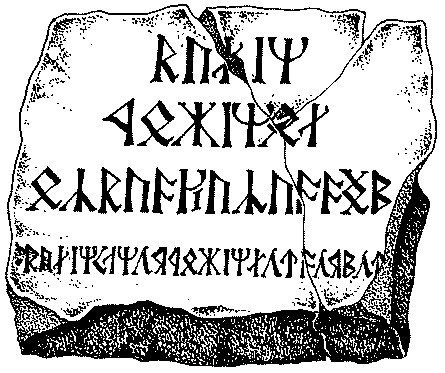

Transcribed inscription

BALIN

FUN_{d}INUL

UZBADK_{h}AZADDÛMU

BALIN SƏN OV FUNDIN LORD OV MORIA

Notes

Khuzdul

English

== Supporting the frame story ==
A second reason for Tolkien to make use of pseudotranslation was to lend realism by supporting a found manuscript conceit; this in turn strengthened and lent consistency to the philological way Tolkien had chosen to frame his story. Tolkien used a frame story, embedded within the text, to make the story appear to have been written and edited by many hands over a long period of time. He described in detail how Bilbo and Frodo Baggins wrote their memoirs, transmitted them to others as the Red Book of Westmarch, and showed how later in-universe editors annotated the material. Tolkien then appears not as the book's author but as editor and translator, the text as a survival through long ages, and the events depicted as historical. Catherine Butler comments that this was "congenial work" which "suited the philological Tolkien with his many medieval documents".

Found manuscript and pseudotranslation supporting Tolkien's frame story
Time	Events	Notes
Third Age	The quest of Erebor; Bilbo Baggins writes his memoirs in Westron. War of the Ring	Pseudo-history conceit The Hobbit; Further pseudo-history
Fourth Age	Frodo Baggins writes his memoirs in Westron. Others annotate the memoirs: the Red Book of Westmarch.	The Lord of the Rings; Found manuscript conceit
Fifth Age	... more editing by more hands ...	Pseudo-editor conceit
Sixth/Seventh Age	The Tolkien 'editor' "translates" the found manuscript into English (and a little Old Norse and Old English)	Pseudo-translator conceit

== See also ==
- Languages constructed by J. R. R. Tolkien

== Sources ==
- Brljak, Vladimir (2010). "The Books of Lost Tales: Tolkien as Metafictionist". Tolkien Studies. 7 (1): 1–34. doi:10.1353/tks.0.0079.
- Butler, Catherine (2013). "Tolkien and Worldbuilding". In Hunt, Peter (ed.). J. R. R. Tolkien: The Hobbit and The Lord of the Rings. Palgrave Macmillan. pp. 106–120. ISBN 978-1-137-26399-5.
- Carpenter, Humphrey, ed. (2023) [1981]. The Letters of J. R. R. Tolkien: Revised and Expanded Edition. New York: HarperCollins. ISBN 978-0-35-865298-4.
- Eisenberg, Daniel [in Spanish] (1982) [1976]. "The Pseudo-Historicity of the Romances of Chivalry". Romanes of Chivalry in the Spanish Golden Age. first published in Quaderni Ibero-Americani, 45–46 (1975–76), pp. 253–259. Newark, Delaware: Juan de la Cuesta Hispanic Monographs. pp. 119–129. ISBN 0936388072.
- Evans, Jonathan (2013b) [2007]. "Dwarves". In Drout, Michael D. C. (ed.). The J. R. R. Tolkien Encyclopedia. Abingdon, England: Routledge. pp. 134–135. ISBN 978-0-415-86511-1.
- Fimi, Dimitra (2010) [2008]. Tolkien, Race, and Cultural History: From Fairies to Hobbits. Palgrave Macmillan. ISBN 978-0-230-21951-9. OCLC 222251097.
- Flieger, Verlyn (2005). Interrupted Music: The Making of Tolkien's Mythology. Kent State University Press.
- Garth, John (2003). Tolkien and the Great War: The Threshold of Middle-earth. HarperCollins. ISBN 978-0-00711-953-0.
- Hemmi, Yoko (2010). "Tolkien's The Lord of the Rings and His Concept of Native Language: Sindarin and British-Welsh". Tolkien Studies. 7: 147–174. doi:10.1353/tks.0.0063. S2CID 170366632 – via Project Muse.
- Honegger, Thomas (2011b) [2004]. "The Westron Turned into Modern English: The Translator and Tolkien's Web of Languages". In Honegger, Thomas (ed.). Translating Tolkien: Text and Film. Cormarë series. Vol. 6. Walking Tree Publishers. pp. 1–18. ISBN 978-3-9521424-9-3.
- Madoff, Mark (1979). "The Useful Myth of Gothic Ancestry". Studies in Eighteenth-Century Culture. 8 (1): 337–350. doi:10.1353/sec.1979.0019. ISSN 1938-6133.
- Rateliff, John D. (2007). The History of the Hobbit. London: HarperCollins. ISBN 978-0-00-723555-1.
- Shippey, Tom (2005) [1982]. The Road to Middle-Earth: How J. R. R. Tolkien Created a New Mythology (Third ed.). HarperCollins. ISBN 978-0-261-10275-0.
- Smith, Arden Ray (2006). "Translating Tolkien: Philological Elements in "The Lord of the Rings" (review)". Tolkien Studies. 3 (1): 228–231. doi:10.1353/tks.2006.0031. ISSN 1547-3163.
- Smith, Arden R. (2020) [2014]. "Invented Languages and Writing Systems". In Lee, Stuart D. (ed.). A Companion to J. R. R. Tolkien. Wiley Blackwell. pp. 202–214. ISBN 978-1119656029. OCLC 1183854105.
- Tolkien, J. R. R. (1954a). The Fellowship of the Ring. The Lord of the Rings. Boston: Houghton Mifflin. OCLC 9552942.
- Tolkien, J. R. R. (1954). The Two Towers. The Lord of the Rings. Boston: Houghton Mifflin. OCLC 1042159111.
- Tolkien, J. R. R. (1955). The Return of the King. The Lord of the Rings. Boston: Houghton Mifflin. OCLC 519647821.
- Tolkien, J. R. R. (1980). Christopher Tolkien (ed.). Unfinished Tales. Boston: Houghton Mifflin. ISBN 978-0-395-29917-3.
- Tolkien, J. R. R. (1996). Christopher Tolkien (ed.). The Peoples of Middle-earth. Boston: Houghton Mifflin. ISBN 978-0-395-82760-4.
- Tolkien, J. R. R. (July 2001). Hostetter, Carl F. (ed.). "The Rivers and Beacon-hills of Gondor". Vinyar Tengwar (42): 8.
- Turner, Allan (2005). Translating Tolkien: Philological Elements in 'The Lord of the Rings'. Duisburger Arbeiten zur Sprach– und Kulturwissenschaft. Vol. 59. Frankfurt: Peter Lang. ISBN 3-631-53517-1.
- Turner, Allan (2007). "Language, Theories of: Translation". In Drout, Michael D. C. (ed.). J.R.R. Tolkien Encyclopedia. Routledge. pp. 328–330. ISBN 978-1-135-88033-0.
- Turner, Allan (2011a). "A Theoretical Model for Tolkien Translation Criticism". In Honegger, Thomas (ed.). Tolkien in Translation. Cormarë series. Vol. 4. Zurich: Walking Tree Publishers. pp. 1–30. ISBN 978-3-9521424-6-2.
