= Nordic Journal of English Studies =

- Discipline: English language, English literature
- Language: English
- Edited by: Virginia Langum, Terry Walker

Publication details
- History: 2002–present
- Frequency: 2-3 times a year
- Open access: yes

Standard abbreviations
- ISO 4: Nord. J. Engl. Stud.

Indexing
- ISSN: 1654-6970
- OCLC no.: 185220935

Links
- Journal homepage

The Nordic Journal of English Studies (NJES) is a Nordic peer-reviewed academic journal focusing on English language and literature. It was established in 2002 and published by the University of Oslo until 2006 and then by the University of Gothenburg until 2020. NJES is associated with the Nordic Association of English Studies. The current editors are Millie Schurch (literature), who replaced Virginia Langum in 2026 and Terry Walker (linguistics). The former editors were Karin Aijmer (linguistics) and Chloé Avril (literature).

The journal publishes two or three issues each year, which are either general issues or special theme issues with guest editors. Prospective guest editors are invited to submit proposals for special issues, particularly on topics that bring different areas of English studies (such as linguistics, literature, and teaching and learning) into dialogue. Scholars based at institutions outside the Nordic countries may submit proposals, but each special issue is expected to include at least one contribution from a scholar at a Nordic institution.

The general issues serve as a venue for original research in the fields of English studies, including language, literature, culture, and the teaching and learning of English. For the general issues, NJES invites submissions from scholars with an affiliation to a Nordic institution.

NJES also publishes conference proceedings and festschrifts to honour a Nordic colleague if they can be subsumed under a special theme. The journal also publishes reviews of books thought to be of interest to its readers.

The policy of the journal is also to provide a possibility for early career or doctoral researchers to publish their articles on English language or literature in a peer-reviewed journal along with more established scholars.

A number of thematic issues have been published, including:

- English for Academic Purposes
- Textual Masculinity
- Literature as Communication
- English as a lingua franca
