= Bree (Middle-earth) =

Fictional village in J. R. R. Tolkien's Middle-earth

Bree is a fictional village in J. R. R. Tolkien's Middle-earth, east of the Shire. Bree-land, which contains Bree and a few other villages, is the only place where Hobbits and Men lived side by side. It was inspired by the name of the Buckinghamshire village of Brill, meaning "hill-hill", which Tolkien visited regularly in his early years at the University of Oxford, and informed by his passion for linguistics.

In Bree is The Prancing Pony inn, where the wizard Gandalf meets the Dwarf Thorin Oakenshield, setting off the quest to Erebor described in The Hobbit, and where Frodo Baggins puts on the One Ring, attracting the attention of the Dark Lord Sauron's spies and an attack by the Black Riders.

Scholars have stated that Tolkien chose the placenames of Bree-land carefully, incorporating Celtic elements into the names to indicate that Bree was older than the Shire, whose placenames are English with Old English elements. Others have commented that Bree functions as a place of transition from the comfort and safety of home to the dangers of the journey that lies ahead.

== Fictional history ==
'Well, Master Underhill', said Strider, 'if I were you, I should stop your young friends from talking too much. Drink, fire, and chance-meeting are pleasant enough, but, well – this isn't the Shire. There are queer folk about. Though I say it as shouldn't, you may think', he added with a wry smile, seeing Frodo's glance. 'And there have been even stranger travellers through Bree lately', he went on, watching Frodo's face. (Note: Tolkien 1954a, book 1, ch. 9 "At the Sign of the Prancing Pony")

Bree was the starting point for the Fallohide brothers and leaders, Marcho and Blanco, when they travelled west in the year 1601 of the Third Age. They led their Hobbits across the river Baranduin and took the land there to found the Shire. (Note: Tolkien 1954a "Prologue", 1. "Concerning Hobbits")

Two important events leading up to the War of the Ring take place at The Prancing Pony. The first is "a chance-meeting" of the Wizard Gandalf and the exiled Dwarf Thorin Oakenshield; this meeting leads to the destruction of Smaug. (Note: Tolkien 1980, "The Quest of Erebor") The second occurs during the journey of Frodo Baggins to Rivendell, when he and his companions stay at The Prancing Pony for a night. After singing The Man in the Moon Stayed Up Too Late, Frodo accidentally slips the One Ring on his finger, and becomes invisible. The minor villain Bill Ferny and a squint-eyed "Southerner", a person from some land far to the south, see him vanish, and inform the Black Riders, who attack the inn. Aragorn saves him and leads the party away, after the innkeeper Barliman Butterbur delivers a letter from Gandalf which he had forgotten to deliver months earlier. (Note: Tolkien 1980, "The Hunt for the Ring")

== Fictional geography ==
=== Settlement ===
Bree is an ancient settlement of men in Eriador, some 40 miles (64 km) east of the Shire. After the collapse of the kingdom of Arnor, Bree continued to thrive without any central authority for many centuries. As Bree lies at the meeting of two large roadways, the Great East Road and the long disused Greenway or Great North Road, (Note: The Great North Road is the name of the main road, now the A1, from England to Scotland.) it has for centuries been a centre of trade and a stopping place for travellers. When Arnor in the north waned, Bree's prosperity and size declined. Pipe-weed flourishes on the south-facing side of Bree-hill, and the Hobbits of Bree claim to have been the first to smoke it; travellers on the road including Dwarves, Rangers, and Wizards took up the habit when they visited the village on their journeys. Directly west of Bree are the Barrow-downs and the Old Forest. Bree is the chief village of Bree-land, and the only place in Middle-earth where men and hobbits live side by side. The hobbit community is older than that of the Shire, which was originally colonized from Bree. By the time of The Lord of the Rings, Bree is the westernmost settlement of men in Middle-earth, and there is no other settlement of men within a hundred leagues of the Shire. Tom Bombadil knows of Bree, saying in his metrical speech "four miles along the road / you'll come upon a village, / Bree under Bree-hill, / with doors looking westward."

Tolkien wrote of the origins for the people of Bree, that Bree had been founded and populated by men of the Edain who did not reach Beleriand in the First Age, remaining east of the mountains in Eriador, possibly from the same stock as the Dunlendings. (Note: Tolkien 1955, Appendix F)

=== The Prancing Pony inn ===
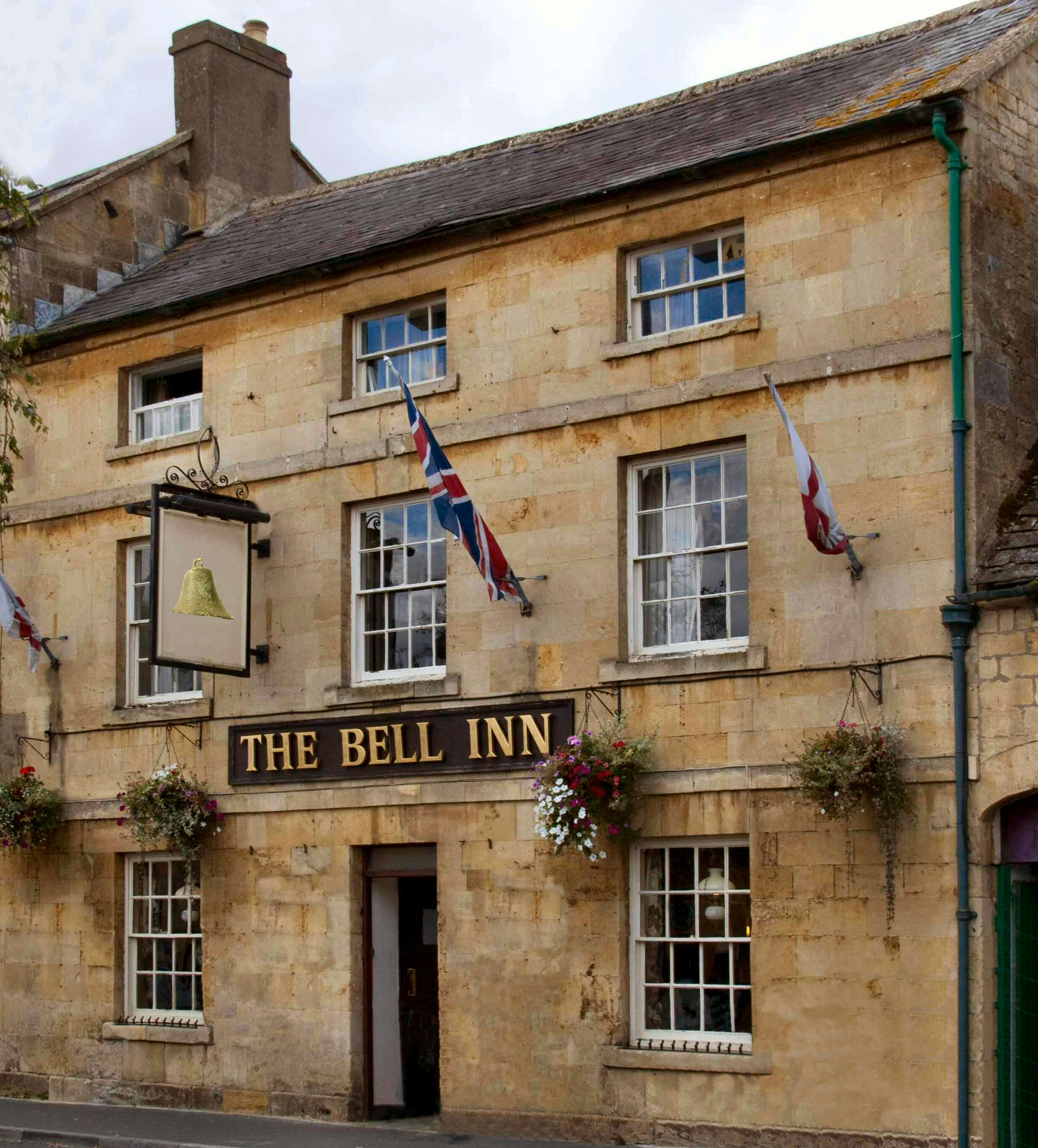
Research by a branch of the Tolkien Society suggests that The Bell Inn in Moreton-in-Marsh, with its name above the door, was a source of inspiration for The Prancing Pony.

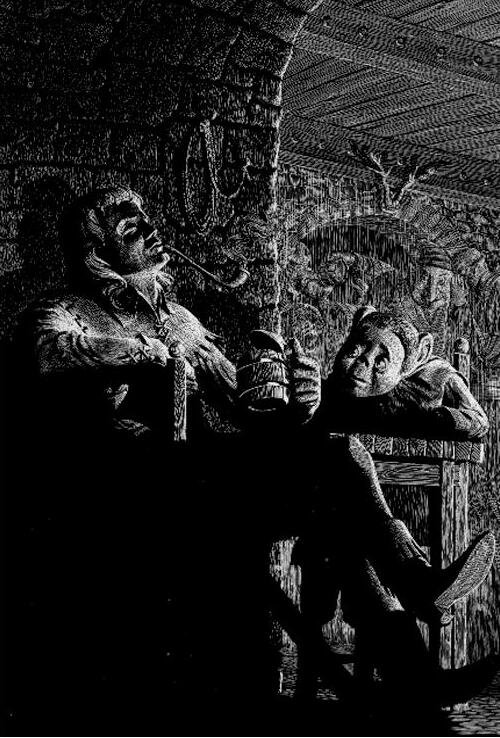
Frodo meeting Strider in The Prancing Pony. Scraperboard drawing by Alexander Korotich, 1981

The Prancing Pony was Bree's inn. It served beer to locals, and provided accommodation and food to travellers. One of Eriador's major cross-roads was just outside the village: the meeting of the Great East Road and the Greenway. The inn was at a road junction in the centre of the village, at the base of the Bree-hill. The Prancing Pony was frequented by Men, Hobbits and Dwarves. Bucklanders from the Shire occasionally travelled to the inn. The art of smoking pipe-weed was said to have begun in Bree, and from The Prancing Pony it spread among the races of Middle-earth. The inn was noted for its fine beer, once sampled by Gandalf. (Note: Tolkien 1954a, book 2, ch. 2 "The Council of Elrond") The building is described in The Lord of the Rings:

"Even from the outside the inn looked a pleasant house to familiar eyes. It had a front on the Road, and two wings running back on land partly cut out of the lower slopes of the hill, so that at the rear the second-floor windows were level with the ground. There was a wide arch leading to a courtyard between the two wings, and on the left under the arch there was a large doorway reached by a few broad steps. ... Above the arch there was a lamp, and beneath it swung a large signboard: a fat white pony reared up on its hind legs. Over the door was painted in white letters: THE PRANCING PONY by BARLIMAN BUTTERBUR."

The philologist J. Wust considers what script the writing over the door was in. He notes that the Hobbits had learnt to write from the Dunedain of the Northern kingdom, and could read the Prancing Pony inscription but that Pippin could not read the inscriptions on the houses in Minas Tirith, the city in the Southern land of Gondor. Wust suggests that in the North, a "full writing mode" was used for the Tengwar inscriptions, whereas in Gondor, the abbreviated tehta mode (with dots and marks above or below the consonants to indicate vowel sounds) was employed, presenting the text quite differently.

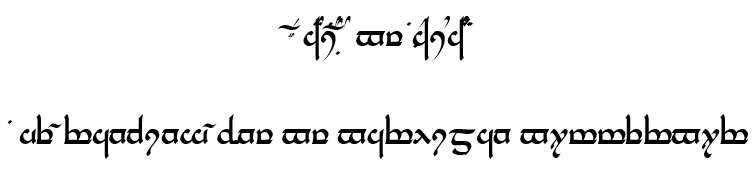
"THE PRANCING PONY by BARLIMAN BUTTERBUR" in two different Tengwar modes: the abbreviated tehta of Gondor (above); the full mode (below). If the full mode was what the Hobbits were used to, the text above the door of the inn would have been in that mode, and that would explain why they could not read tehta signs in Gondor.

== Concept and creation ==
=== Placenames ===
Tolkien stated that the name "Bree" means "hill"; he justified the name by arranging the village and the surrounding Bree-land around a large hill, named Bree-hill. The name of the village of Brill, in Buckinghamshire, which Tolkien visited when he was at the University of Oxford and which inspired him to create Bree, (Note: Tolkien 1988, ch. 7, p. 131, note 6. "Bree ... [was] based on Brill ... a place which he knew well".) is constructed exactly the same way: Brill is a modern contraction of Breʒ-hyll. Both syllables are words for the same thing, "hill" – the first is Brythonic (Celtic) and the second Old English. The Tolkien scholar Tom Shippey writes that the name Brill's construction, "hill-hill", is "therefore in a way nonsense, exactly parallel with Chetwode (or 'wood-wood') in Berkshire close by." The first element "Chet" in "Chetwode" derives from the Brythonic ced, meaning "wood".

Shippey notes further that Tolkien stated (Note: Tolkien 1955 Appendix F) that he had selected Bree-land placenames – Archet, Bree, Chetwood, and Combe – because they "contained non-English elements", which would make them "sound 'queer', to imitate 'a style that we should perhaps vaguely feel to be “Celtic”'." Shippey comments that this was part of Tolkien's "linguistic heresy", his theory that the sound of words conveyed both meaning and beauty. The philologist Christopher Robinson writes that Tolkien chose a name to "fit not only its designee, but also the phonological and morphological style of the nomenclature to which it belongs, as well as the linguistic scheme of his invented world." In Robinson's view, Tolkien intentionally selected "Celtic elements that have survived in the place names of England" – like bree and chet – to mark them as older than the Shire placenames which embody "a hint of the past" with their English and Old English elements. All of this indicates the "remarkable care and sophistication" with which Tolkien constructed the "feigned history and translation from Westron personal and placenames".

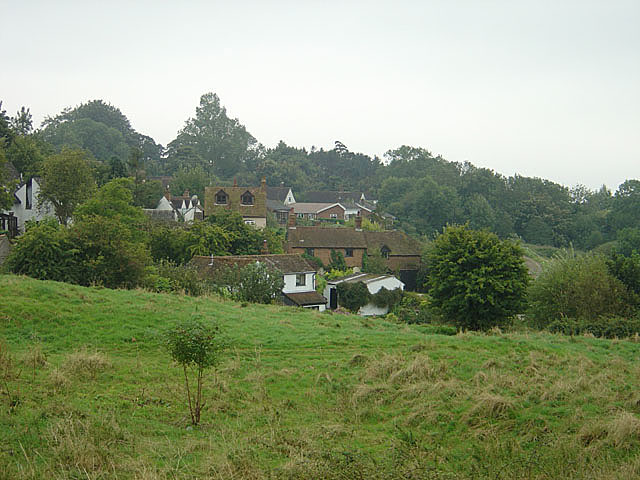
The name "Bree" was inspired by the name of the village of Brill, Buckinghamshire; it contains the Celtic Breʒ and the Old English hyll, both meaning "hill".

Brill, Chetwode etymologies from Brythonic ('Celtic') and Old English

Placenames of Bree-land, with the villages of Bree, Combe, Staddle, and Archet in the Chetwood, that Tolkien meant to sound and feel Celtic.

=== Personal names ===
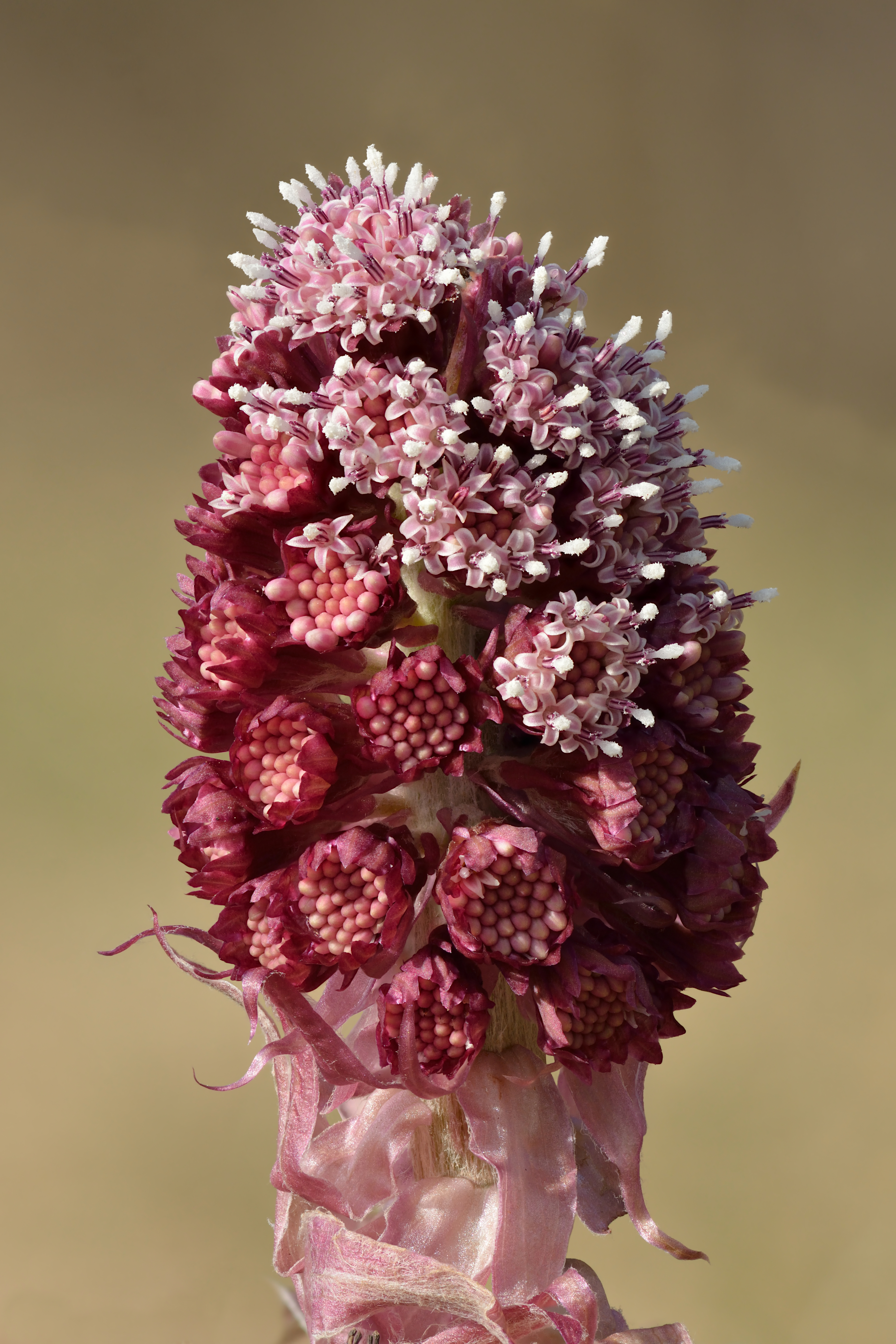
Barliman Butterbur is named after the butterbur, "a fleshy plant with a heavy flower-head on a thick stalk", as Tolkien put it.

Men of Bree often used plant names as surnames, as with the character Bill Ferny. Barliman Butterbur's surname is the name of the herbaceous perennial Petasites hybridus. Tolkien described the butterbur as "a fleshy plant with a heavy flower-head on a thick stalk, and very large leaves." He evidently chose this name as appropriate to a fat man; he suggested that translators use the name of some plant with "butter" in the name if possible, but in any event "a fat thick plant". The Tolkien scholar Ralph C. Wood writes that the forename "Barliman" too is descriptive, hinting at "the hops that he brews" for his inn, barley being the grain used to make beer.

== Analysis ==
The Tolkien scholar Thomas Honegger writes that Bree functions "as a point of transition between the hobbit-homeland and the wide expanse of Eriador", with its mixed population of hobbits and Men. It is clearly separate from the Shire, but its architecture retains "some degree of Shire homeliness and comfort." The inn is "mannish" but it welcomes Hobbits with rooms "built into the hill, thus imitating traditional hobbit-architecture." This made it one of Frodo's five Homely Houses. Bo Walther, in Tolkien Studies, writes that Bree, with The Prancing Pony inn, is "creepy but also familiar", a place where the Hobbits can begin to face their fear of the unknown, "cheered up by the recognizable bouquet of beer and the sight of jovial hobbit faces."

The scholar of humanities Brian Rosebury quotes at length from the Hobbits' approach to Bree and their arrival at The Prancing Pony, "to bring out the leisurely pace, and the patient attention to sensory impressions, typical of the narrative". He comments that there is much more detail than would be found in an allegory, and that it describes the "emotional experience of arriving at an unfamiliar place: the little-travelled and socially-deferential Sam (Frodo's servant) feels an anxiety from which the others are relatively free." He states that Tolkien sets "both comforting and terrifying events" in The Prancing Pony, insisting that "it remains resolutely unallegorical": it is "neither a symbol of comfort, nor the abode of giants which it half-appears to Sam". Rosebury adds that the use of proverbs specific to Bree, like Butterbur's "there's no accounting for East and West as we say in Bree, meaning the Rangers and the Shire-folk, begging your pardon", provides both a comic element and "fix[es] the geographical contact-but-distance between the two communities."

== In adaptations ==
Dark looks from some of the Men the Hobbits see in Peter Jackson's rendering of The Prancing Pony inn at Bree, in his 2001 film The Fellowship of the Ring

Butterbur appears in both Ralph Bakshi's animated 1978 adaptation of The Lord of the Rings and Peter Jackson's epic live-action 2001 film The Fellowship of the Ring, but in both adaptations most of his scenes are cut. Alan Tilvern voiced Butterbur (credited as "Innkeeper") in the animated film, while David Weatherley played him in Jackson's epic. James Grout played Butterbur in BBC Radio's 1981 serialization of The Lord of the Rings. In the 1991 low-budget Russian adaptation of The Fellowship of the Ring, Khraniteli, he appears as "Lavr Narkiss", played by Nikolay Burov. In the 1993 television miniseries Hobitit by Finnish broadcaster Yle, Butterbur ("Viljami Voivalvatti" in Finnish, meaning "William Butter") was portrayed by Mikko Kivinen.

In Jackson's film, far from being a friendly place as in the book, Bree is constantly unpleasant and threatening; and whereas in the book the Ring just makes Frodo disappear when he puts it on in The Prancing Pony, in the film there are special effects with a strong wind, blue light, and the Eye of Sauron. A character credited as "Butterbur, Sr" appears briefly during the prologue of Jackson's 2013 The Hobbit: The Desolation of Smaug, portrayed by Richard Whiteside.

Bree and Bree-land are featured prominently in the PC game The Lord of the Rings Online, which allows the player to explore the town.
