= Westron =

Language invented by J. R. R. Tolkien

- Adûni, Sôval Phârë
- Created by: J. R. R. Tolkien
- Setting and usage: Middle-earth
- Purpose: Constructed: Artistic; Fictional; Languages of Arda; Westron
- Early form: Adûnaic

Language codes
- ISO 639-3: None (mis)
- Glottolog: None

Westron (called Adûni in Westron, or Sôval Phârë, meaning "Common Speech") is the constructed language that was supposedly the Common Speech used in J. R. R. Tolkien's world of Middle-earth in the Third Age, at the time of The Lord of the Rings. It ostensibly developed from Adûnaic, the ancient language of Númenor. In practice in the novel, Westron is nearly always represented by modern English, in a process of pseudo-translation which also sees Rohirric represented by Old English. That process allowed Tolkien not to develop Westron or Rohirric in any detail. In the Appendices of the novel, Tolkien gives some examples of Westron words.

== Context ==
From his schooldays, J. R. R. Tolkien was, in the words of his biographer John Garth, "effusive about philology"; his schoolfriend Rob Gilson called him "quite a great authority on etymology". Tolkien was a professional philologist, a scholar of comparative and historical linguistics. He was especially familiar with Old English and related languages. He remarked to the poet and The New York Times book reviewer Harvey Breit that "I am a philologist and all my work is philological"; he explained to his American publisher Houghton Mifflin that this was meant to imply that his work was "all of a piece, and fundamentally linguistic in inspiration. ... The invention of languages is the foundation. The 'stories' were made rather to provide a world for the languages than the reverse. To me a name comes first and the story follows." (Note: Carpenter 2023, #165 to Houghton Mifflin, 30 June 1955)

Tolkien created a large family of Elvish languages, the best-known and most developed being Quenya and Sindarin. In addition, he sketched in the Mannish languages of Westron's precursor, Adûnaic, and Rohirric; the Dwarvish language of Khuzdul; (Note: Carpenter 2023, #176 to Naomi Mitchison, 8 December 1955) the Entish language; (Note: Tolkien 1955, Appendix F) and the Black Speech of the Orcs. According to Tom Shippey, Tolkien invented parts of Middle-earth to resolve the linguistic puzzle he had accidentally created by using three different pseudo-translated European languages for those of peoples in his legendarium.

According to Tom Shippey, Tolkien invented parts of Middle-earth to resolve the linguistic puzzle he had accidentally created by using three different pseudo-translated European languages for those of peoples in his legendarium.

== Linguistic mapping ==
When writing The Lord of the Rings (1954–55), a sequel to The Hobbit (1937), Tolkien came up with the literary device of using real languages to "translate" fictional languages. He pretended that he had not composed the book himself but had translated it from Westron (named Adûni in Westron) or Common Speech (Sôval Phârë, in Westron) into English. The purpose of this was to provide an explanation for why the Common Speech is almost entirely rendered as English in the novel. This device of rendering an imaginary language with a real one was carried further by rendering:

- Rohirric, the language of Rohan (related to Westron) by the Mercian dialect of Old English;
- names in the tongue of Dale by Old Norse forms;
- names of the Kingdom of Rhovanion by Gothic forms, thus mapping the genetic relation of his fictional languages on to the existing historical relations of the Germanic languages.

The whole device of linguistic mapping was essentially a fix for the problems Tolkien had created for himself by using real Norse names for the Dwarves in The Hobbit, rather than inventing new names in Khuzdul, the language of the Dwarves. This seemed a clever solution, as it allowed him to explain the book's use of Modern English as representing Westron. Because of this, Tolkien did not need to develop Westron grammar or vocabulary in any detail.

The mapping of Old English to Modern English is like the mapping of Rohirric to Westron, and Tolkien uses the two Germanic languages to represent the two Middle-earth languages. Further, Tolkien uses Gothic names for the early leaders of the Northmen of Rhovanion, ancestors of Rohan. (Note: Tolkien 1980, p. 311)

Tolkien went further, using Gothic names for the early leaders of the Northmen of Rhovanion, ancestors of Rohan, and for the first Kings of Rohan. Gothic was an East Germanic language, and as such is a forerunner of Old English, not a direct ancestor. Christopher Tolkien suggests that his father intended the correspondence between the language families to extend back to the ancestral language of the Northmen.

Mapping of names of leaders (Note: Tolkien 1955, Appendix A: Annals of the Kings and Rulers, II: The House of Eorl)
Realm	Leader's name	Etymology	Meaning	"Translated from"
Northmen of Rhovanion	Vidugavia	Latinised from Gothic widu, gauja	wood-dweller	(Pre-Rohirric)
Northmen of Rhovanion	Marhwini	Gothic marh, wini	horse-friend	(Pre-Rohirric)
Rohan	Folcwine	Old English folc, winë	folk-friend	Rohirric
Rohan	Éowyn	Old English eo[h], wyn	horse-joy	Rohirric

== Language ==
Westron (also called Adûni) supposedly developed from Adûnaic, the ancient language of Númenor. (Note: Tolkien 1992, pp. 241, 247–250, 413–440) It became the lingua franca for all the peoples of Middle-earth: Tolkien gives some examples of Westron words in Appendix F to The Lord of the Rings, where he summarizes Westron's origin and role as lingua franca in Middle-earth:

The language represented in this history by English was the Westron or 'Common Speech' of the West-lands of Middle-earth in the Third Age. In the course of that age it had become the native language of nearly all the speaking-peoples (save the Elves) who dwelt within the bounds of the old kingdoms of Arnor and Gondor ... At the time of the War of the Ring at the end of the age these were still its bounds as a native tongue.

He explains further that:

the Númenóreans had maintained ... havens upon the western coasts of Middle-earth for the help of their ships; and one of the chief of these was at Pelargir near the Mouths of Anduin. There Adûnaic was spoken, and mingled with many words of the languages of lesser men it became a Common Speech that spread thence along the coasts among all that had dealings with Westernesse.

Tolkien gives a few names in Westron, saying that Karningul was the translation of Elvish Imladris, Rivendell, while Sûza was Westron for the Shire. Hobbit surnames Took and Boffin were "anglicize[d]" from Westron Tûk and Bophîn. The original form of Brandybuck was Zaragamba, "Oldbuck", from Westron zara, "old", and gamba, "buck". He explains, too, that Sam[wise] and Ham[fast] "were really called Ban and Ran", shortened from Westron Banazîr and Ranugad. Tolkien states that these had been nicknames, meaning "halfwise, simple" and "stay-at-home", which he had chosen to render by English names, from Old English samwís and hámfoest with equivalent meanings. Nick Groom states that Sûza, Banazîr, and the Westron for Sam's surname "Gamgee", Galbasi, are all derived from Gothic, a precursor of Old English, adding a further layer of linguistic complexity to the pseudotranslation.

The word Hobbit, which Tolkien's fictional persona, the narrator of the appendices, admits "is an invention", could, he explains, easily be a much-worn form of the Old English holbytla, "hole-dweller". This corresponds to the Westron dialect form kuduk, used in Bree and the Shire, which the narrator supposes was probably a worn form of the word kûd-dûkan, of the same meaning, stating that Merry had heard King Théoden of Rohan use this name for Hobbit.

== Sources ==
- Carpenter, Humphrey, ed. (2023) [1981]. The Letters of J. R. R. Tolkien: Revised and Expanded Edition. New York: HarperCollins. ISBN 978-0-35-865298-4.
- Fauskanger, Helge K. (2012). "Various Mannish Tongues - the sadness of Mortal Men?". Ardalambion. University of Bergen. Archived from the original on 19 February 2014.
- Fimi, Dimitra (2010) [2008]. Tolkien, Race, and Cultural History: From Fairies to Hobbits. Palgrave Macmillan. ISBN 978-0-230-21951-9. OCLC 222251097.
- Garth, John (2003). Tolkien and the Great War: The Threshold of Middle-earth. HarperCollins. ISBN 978-0-00711-953-0.
- Groom, Nick (2022). Twenty-First Century Tolkien: What Middle-earth Means to Us Today. Atlantic Books. ISBN 978-1838-95700-1.
- Hemmi, Yoko (2010). "Tolkien's The Lord of the Rings and His Concept of Native Language: Sindarin and British-Welsh". Tolkien Studies. 7: 147–174. doi:10.1353/tks.0.0063. S2CID 170366632 – via Project Muse.
- Hostetter, Carl F. (2013) [2007]. "Languages Invented by Tolkien". In Drout, Michael D. C. (ed.). J. R. R. Tolkien Encyclopedia. Routledge. pp. 332–344. ISBN 978-0-415-86511-1.
- Madoff, Mark (1979). "The Useful Myth of Gothic Ancestry". Studies in Eighteenth-Century Culture. 8 (1): 337–350. doi:10.1353/sec.1979.0019. ISSN 1938-6133.
- Shippey, Tom (2005) [1982]. The Road to Middle-Earth: How J. R. R. Tolkien Created a New Mythology (Third ed.). HarperCollins. ISBN 978-0-261-10275-0.
- Smith, Arden R. (2020) [2014]. "Invented Languages and Writing Systems". In Lee, Stuart D. (ed.). A Companion to J. R. R. Tolkien. Wiley Blackwell. pp. 202–214. ISBN 978-1119656029. OCLC 1183854105.
- Solopova, Elizabeth (2009). Languages, Myths and History: An Introduction to the Linguistic and Literary Background of J. R. R. Tolkien's Fiction. New York City: North Landing Books. ISBN 978-0-9816607-1-4.
- Tolkien, J. R. R. (1955). The Return of the King. The Lord of the Rings. Boston: Houghton Mifflin. OCLC 519647821.
- Tolkien, J. R. R. (1980). Christopher Tolkien (ed.). Unfinished Tales. Boston: Houghton Mifflin. ISBN 978-0-395-29917-3.
- Tolkien, J. R. R. (1992). Christopher Tolkien (ed.). Sauron Defeated. Boston, New York, & London: Houghton Mifflin. ISBN 0-395-60649-7.
- Tolkien, J. R. R. (July 2001). Hostetter, Carl F. (ed.). "The Rivers and Beacon-hills of Gondor". Vinyar Tengwar (42).
