= Allan Turner =

Linguist and Tolkien scholar

Allan Turner is a linguist and medievalist, best known as a Tolkien scholar. His 2005 book Translating Tolkien and his 2013 book Tolkien's Poetry have been welcomed by other scholars.

== Life ==
Allan Turner was born c. 1949. He was educated at Deacon's School, Peterborough. His bachelor's degree was in German at the University of Reading, where he also gained an M.Phil with a dissertation on Christi Leiden, a medieval manuscript. He took another master's degree, in linguistics, at St John's College, Cambridge. He obtained a certificate in education at the University of Leeds. His PhD was in translation studies, from Newcastle University. He taught successively in the universities of Basel, Trier, Greifswald, and Marburg, and most recently in the Friedrich Schiller University, Jena until his retirement. He has written or edited several books on the fantasy author J. R. R. Tolkien, and has appeared as a keynote speaker at Tolkien conferences.

== Reception ==
=== Tolkien's Poetry ===
Joe Christopher, reviewing Tolkien's Poetry in Mythlore, calls the volume "valuable" as the first scholarly collection on Tolkien's verse, while noting that the essays are "uneven". He praises the contributions by Tom Shippey, Carl Phelpstead, and Nancy Marsch on Tolkien's metre and style, and Petra Zimmermann's essay on how Tolkien uses poetry in The Lord of the Rings.

Andrew Higgins, reviewing the book in Journal of Tolkien Research, calls it "a very interesting and compelling group of articles" in an under-studied area. He praises Turner's own chapter on influences on Tolkien's verse, including the Christian poet Francis Thompson. He notes however that Turner largely discounts the influence of Thompson's "introspection and ... late Victorian sentimentality", except in "The Cottage of Lost Play"; and that Tolkien avoids being as "self-consciously 'arty'" as Thompson. He remarks, too, on Turner's suggestion that Tolkien's practice of embedding varied kinds of poem in a prose work may have come from William Morris. Further, Turner suggests that Tolkien's "hobbit poetry" may have been inspired by the Georgian Poetry movement, which was "markedly English and rural in character".

=== Translating Tolkien ===
David Doughan, reviewing Thomas Honegger's books on translating Tolkien, to which Turner contributed, comments that Turner is "not only a highly intelligent and (dare one say) perceptive scholar—[but] he writes comprehensible English." He writes that Turner deals with "many matters [of translating Tolkien] ... sagely", including the issue of handling Tolkien's pseudotranslation from the Common Speech, Westron, mainly represented as English in the text.

Arden R. Smith, reviewing Turner's Translating Tolkien: Philological Elements in 'The Lord of the Rings' in Tolkien Studies, writes that the book is "the first single-author, book-length examination of the difficulties inherent in translating Tolkien into any other language." He describes it as systematic, and well-grounded in relevant theory, including Shippey's philological criticism.

== Honours and distinctions ==
In 2014, to mark Turner's 65th birthday, Honegger and Dirk Vanderbeke edited a festschrift in his honour, entitled From Peterborough to Faëry: The Poetics and Mechanics of Secondary Worlds.

== Works ==
Books

- 2005 Translating Tolkien: Philological Elements in 'The Lord of the Rings', Peter Lang.
- 2007 The Silmarillion: 30 Years On (editor), Walking Tree Publishers.
- 2013 Tolkien's Poetry (editor, with Julian Eilmann), Walking Tree Publishers.

Chapters

- 2007 The J. R. R. Tolkien Encyclopedia, Routledge.
- 2014 A Companion to J. R. R. Tolkien, Wiley-Blackwell.
