= Dreams and visions in Middle-earth =

Theme in Tolkien's writing

J. R. R. Tolkien repeatedly uses dreams and visions in his Middle-earth writings to create literary effects, allowing the narrative to transition between everyday reality and awareness of other kinds of existence. He follows the conventions of the dream vision in early medieval literature, and the tradition of English visionary writing of Edmund Spenser and John Milton.

A large number of dreams are described in The Lord of the Rings. Scholars have identified multiple functions for these, including hinting at panpsychism—with mind as a reality throughout the world and guidance by the godlike Valar, providing glimpses of paradise, and suggesting that evil characters can place false images in men's minds. A special case is the otherworldly Elvish land of Lothlórien, which resembles the dreamland of the medieval poem Pearl.

== Context ==
=== English literature ===
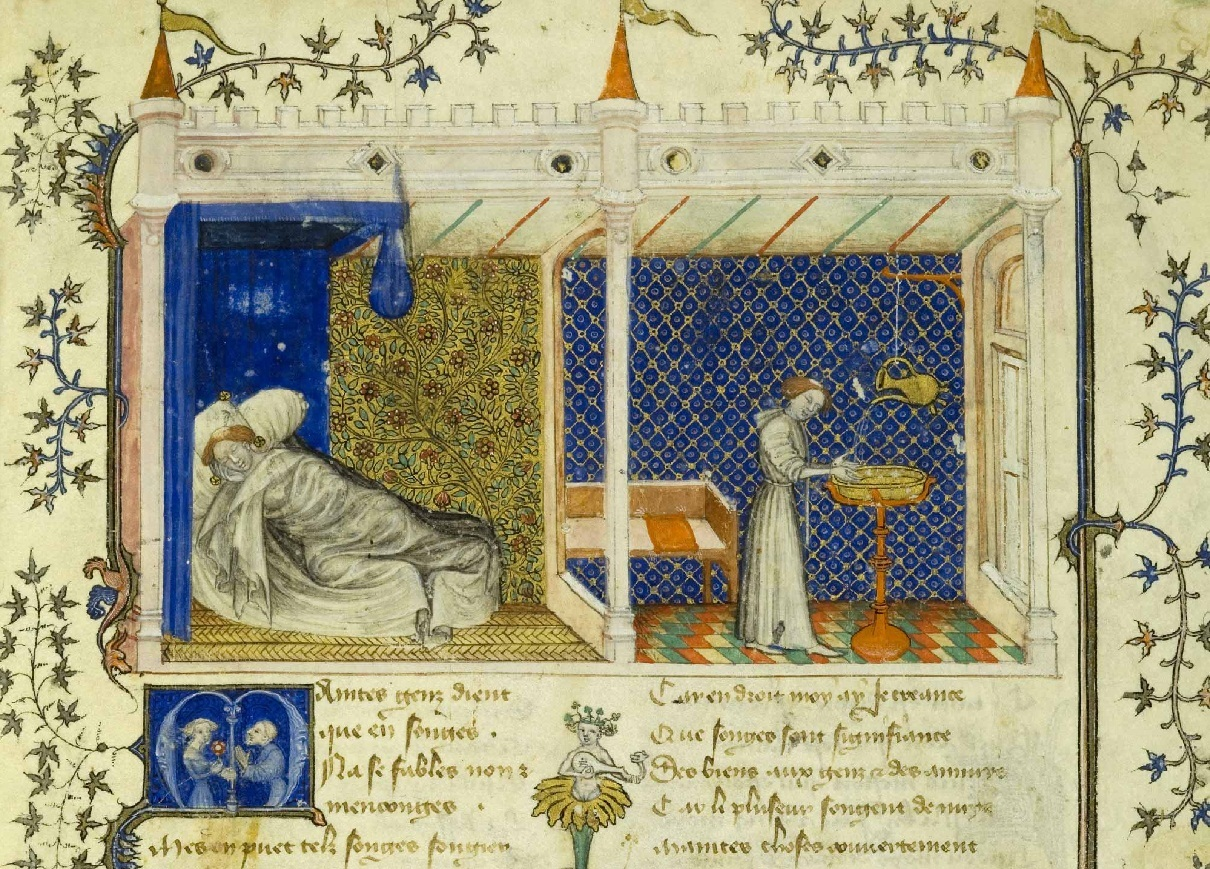
Detail of manuscript of the medieval dream vision, Le Roman de la Rose, with illuminated drawing of the dreamer

The dream vision or visio is a major literary device in early medieval literature, especially but not only in the genre of visionary literature. Amy Amendt-Raduege writes that medieval dream visions, such as those of Geoffrey Chaucer, or those in the Chanson de Roland, the Roman de la Rose, and Sir Gawain and the Green Knight, are intensely visual. Further, she writes, the dreamer often goes to sleep troubled by something, and the dream takes them to an ideal place where they meet a figure of authority, such as Virgil in Dante's Inferno, treated as a dream-story by scholars but not explicitly introduced as a dream. She comments that many dreams in The Lord of the Rings "follow the same conventions".

Coming later in English literature is in Deirdre Greene's words "a tradition of visionary writing which strives toward national epic", from the early modern Edmund Spenser and John Milton, through to modern times with the rather different approach of William Blake and also Tolkien.

=== J. R. R. Tolkien ===
J. R. R. Tolkien was an English author and philologist of ancient Germanic languages, specialising in Old English; he spent much of his career as a professor at the University of Oxford. He is best known for his novels about his invented Middle-earth, The Hobbit and The Lord of the Rings, and for the posthumously published The Silmarillion which provides a more mythical narrative about earlier ages. His books were influenced by ancient, medieval, and modern literature.

In his essay "On Fairy-Stories", Tolkien discusses the function of dreams in fantasy, stating that

in dreams strange powers of the mind may be unlocked. In some of them a man may for a space wield the power of Faërie, that power which, even as it conceives the story, causes it to take living form and colour before the eyes.

— Tolkien, "On Fairy-Stories"

In the essay, Tolkien states further that if a writer uses a dream as the explanation for seemingly magical events, "he cheats deliberately the primal desire at the heart of Faerie: the realization, independent of the conceiving mind, of imagined wonder." In other words, dreams can exist within fantasy, but they must not be used to explain away magical events.

== Narrative ==
=== The Hobbit ===
Before The Hobbit's protagonist Bilbo meets Gollum, Bilbo, sleeping in a cave in the Misty Mountains, has a frightening dream in which he sees a wall crack open, and he falls into an unknown subterranean world. He wakes up, and the dream is partly realized as he sees the group's ponies going away into a new gap at the back of the cave. Then goblins swarm out of the gap and seize Bilbo and the dwarves. (Note: Tolkien 1937, ch. 4 "Over Hill and Under Hill")

=== The Lord of the Rings ===
Sean Lindsay, writing in Mythlore, lists the overt descriptions of dreams or mentions of dreamlike states in The Lord of the Rings (not including dreamlike or visionary passages). By volume, he identifies and quotes 25 dreams in The Fellowship of the Ring; 10 in The Two Towers; and 10 in The Return of the King.

Thus for example in "The Council of Elrond", the protagonist Frodo exclaims "I saw you", explaining to the wizard Gandalf: "You were walking backwards and forwards. The moon shone in your hair." The narrative goes on "Gandalf paused astonished and looked at him. 'It was only a dream', said Frodo, 'but it suddenly came back to me. I had quite forgotten it...'" (Note: Tolkien 1954, Book 2, ch. 2 "The Council of Elrond")

At the end of the novel, Frodo has a different vision, one presaged in another dream (Note: Tolkien 1954a, Book 1, ch. 7 "In the House of Tom Bombadil") hundreds of pages earlier: "until at last on a night of rain Frodo smelled a sweet fragrance on the air and heard the sound of singing that came over the water. And then it seemed to him that as in his dreams in the house of Bombadil, the grey rain-curtain turned all to silver glass and was rolled back, and he beheld white shores and beyond them a far green country under a swift sunrise." (Note: Tolkien 1955, Book 6, ch. 9 "The Grey Havens")

Other beings have dreams; Tolkien's "Song of the Ents and Entwives" depicts the male Ents doing little in summer except dreaming, in contrast to the Entwives for whom summer was a busy time.

=== "The Sea-Bell" ===
Tolkien's poem "The Sea-Bell" was published in the 1962 collection The Adventures of Tom Bombadil, sub-titled Frodos Dreme. Tolkien suggests that this enigmatic narrative poem represents the despairing dreams that visited Frodo in the Shire in the years after the destruction of the Ring. It relates the unnamed speaker's journey to a mysterious land across the sea, where he tries but fails to make contact with the people who dwell there. He descends into despair and near-madness, eventually returning to his own country, to find himself utterly alienated from those he once knew.

== Analysis ==
Lindsay writes that in The Lord of the Rings a dream may simply indicate a mental state, such as of weariness; it may denote a dreamlike state, such as when Frodo listens to Elvish music in Rivendell; and it may mean a full-valued vision of some reality, distant in space or time.

=== Psychoanalytic interpretations ===
R. Cameron writes that Bilbo's dream in the cave can be given a psychoanalytic interpretation where, in Sigmund Freud's words, a dream "consists essentially in the transformation of thoughts into a hallucinatory experience". The dream sets out "motifs whose encoded meanings are repeated, expanded and increase in intensity during the ensuing (literal) encounter" of Bilbo and Gollum. The motifs combine "a mythical underworld journey; the psychic model of the unconscious; theological notions of the fall; and ... the infantile ... period of human development."

=== Guidance ===
Karl Schoor, in Mythlore, writes that dreams are not limited to the hobbits in The Lord of the Rings. Faramir, a son of the Steward of Gondor, repeatedly sees Númenor, the island kingdom that was Gondor's predecessor, drowning under a "great dark wave... coming on, darkness unescapable". Tolkien stated that he personally had the recurring dream of the coming wave. (Note: Carpenter 2023, #180 to Mr Thompson, draft, 14 January 1956) Faramir repeatedly has a different dream, one that Schoor calls the most important in the novel, where a voice declaims "Seek for the sword that was broken: In Imladris it dwells; ..." Schoor comments that Faramir's father Denethor, Steward of Gondor, correctly interprets this as a summons to a Council of Elrond at Imladris (Rivendell).

=== True visions ===
It seemed to Frodo that he was lifted up, and passing over he saw that the rock-wall was a circle of hills, and that within it was a plain, and in the midst of the plain stood a pinnacle of stone, like a vast tower but not made by hands. On its top stood the figure of a man. The moon as it rose seemed to hang for a moment above his head and glistened in his white hair as the wind stirred it. Up from the dark plain below came the crying of fell voices, and the howling of many wolves... A mighty eagle swept down and bore him away. The voices wailed and the wolves yammered.

— "In the House of Tom Bombadil"

Nick Groom comments in his book Tolkien in the Twenty-First Century that the descriptions of dreams in The Lord of the Rings take up a remarkable amount of space. He writes that the dreams at once create a feeling of "unreality and insecurity", and lend an additional dimension to the narrative. Taking the example of Frodo's seeing Gandalf atop Orthanc, he comments that the account implies that the vision is true, and that Middle-earth is home to something like panpsychism, more than just material reality. Descriptions of dreams provide hints of the guiding power of the godlike Valar, transcending ordinary reality. Paul Kocher writes that Frodo's visions "set him apart as unusual even before he leaves the Shire". He dreams of the Misty Mountains, the direction he needs to take to begin his quest. He dreams of the sea, where he will one day take ship on his final journey. Kocher comments that some of the great, like Aragorn and the Elf-lords, have "true hunches about coming events"; but those are not in dreams. Frodo, then, "seems gifted with a power possessed only by the greatest among other races."

=== Dark dreams ===
Yvette Kisor states that Tolkien's poem "The Lay of Aotrou and Itroun", modelled on a Breton lai, has "resonances" with several of his other works, including The Lord of the Rings. She likens the imagery of Frodo's "dark dreams" after he has been wounded by the Nazgûl's Morgul-knife to Aotrou's dream where "he walked with children yet unborn / in gardens fair, until the morn / came slowly through the windows tall, / and shadows moved across the wall". Frodo dreams he is in his own garden, but he finds it "faint and dim", and "black shadows" appear behind the hedge. Both, she writes, "dream of gardens that represent a safety of enclosure, and both dreams are threatened by shadows."

=== False images ===
Greene writes that the evil characters in The Lord of the Rings are able to place "false images in the minds of men, or to cause men to perceive true images in a false structure". She gives two examples: Sauron's ability to deceive Denethor to despair by means of the visions he sees in the seeing stone, the Palantír; and the "visual scenario" created by the fallen wizard Saruman's voice as he paints a word-picture to Gandalf of how he and Gandalf could benefit by falling in with the evil of Sauron. She compares Tolkien's "angry distrust of the making of heterodox images" to that of Spenser in The Faerie Queene and Milton in Paradise Regained.

=== Dreamland ===
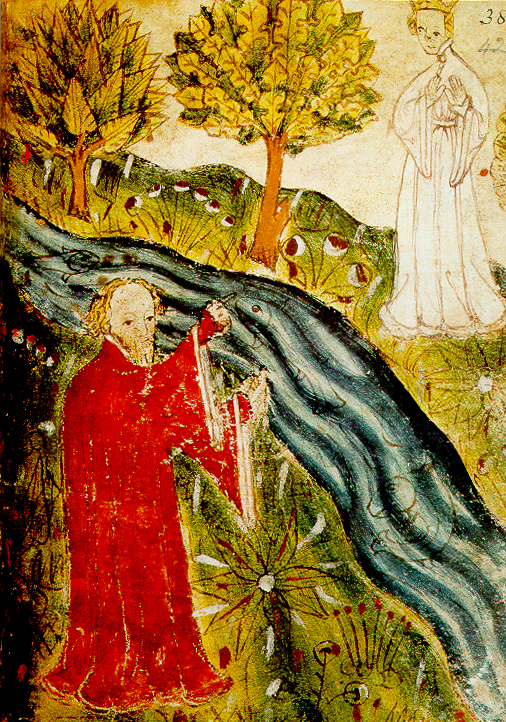
Earthly Paradise: Lothlórien has been compared to the place dreamed of in the Middle English poem Pearl. The miniature from the Cotton Nero manuscript shows the Dreamer on the other side of the stream from the Pearl-maiden.

A special case is the otherworldly Elvish land of Lothlórien, which resembles the dreamland of the medieval poem Pearl; Tolkien was working with that text while he was writing The Lord of the Rings. Amy Amendt-Raduege notes that lórien indeed is the Quenya for 'dream'. The place is dreamlike, with the "celestial colors" of its forest, accessible only "by crossing a river", and it is ruled by a female guide-figure, Galadriel. The land contains a fountain, the Mirror of Galadriel, which supplies visions to those permitted to look into it. Frodo's vision, of the demonic Eye of Sauron, is evidently evil, but under Galadriel's guidance is handled safely. Amendt-Raduege comments that "the vision gives Frodo the insight he needs to complete his quest: the ability to look inside another's heart and read its temptations".

=== Elvish waking dreaming ===
Kocher notes that Tolkien describes the extremely un-Mannish sleep and dreams of the Elf Legolas, as he and his companions follow the trail of the orcs: "he could sleep, if sleep it could be called by Men, resting his mind in the strange paths of elvish dreams, even as he walked open-eyed in the light of this world." (Note: Tolkien 1954, Book 3, ch. 1 "The Riders of Rohan")

=== Time travel ===
Verlyn Flieger notes in her 1997 book A Question of Time that Tolkien much preferred J. W. Dunne's dream mechanism for time travel to mere devices such as H. G. Wells's time machine. He attempted, twice, to write a time travel novel, but failed to complete either The Lost Road or The Notion Club Papers. The idea of travelling back into the distant past survived, however, into The Lord of the Rings, with Dunne-like dreams for major characters, especially Frodo. Flieger further writes that some of the dreams in The Lord of the Rings "are so intertangled that we find ourselves participating in a kind of waking dream or a dream-memory without knowing which is which, when or how we got there." She gives as the prime example the episode in Lothlórien, which she notes Tolkien hints is "outside ordinary time" and "somehow outside ordinary consciousness".

=== Paradise ===
Keith Kelly and Michael Livingston write in Mythlore that descriptions of visions give "the clearest glimpse into Tolkien's depictions of Paradise." They note that Frodo's two visions of the "far green country", near the start and again right at the end, suggest a kind of frame for the novel, bracketing the quest with hints of paradise. They comment that this view of Tolkien's plan is reinforced by a letter he wrote in 1944 while he was writing The Lord of the Rings. In it he stated that "the final scene will be the passage of Bilbo and Elrond and Galadriel through the woods of the Shire on their way to the Grey Havens. Frodo will join them and pass over the sea (linking with the vision he had of a far green country in the house of Tom Bombadil)".

== Legacy ==
The Finnish classical composer Aulis Sallinen's Seventh Symphony is named "The Dreams of Gandalf". The 1996 piece derives from music initially meant to accompany a ballet on the theme of The Hobbit.

Howard Shore, composer of the Music of The Lord of the Rings film series, combined all three variations of his leitmotif "The Shire" in the end credits of The Fellowship of the Ring to create the song "In Dreams". The song has lyrics by Fran Walsh, and the film version is sung by the boy soprano Edward Ross of the London Oratory School Schola.

== Sources ==
- Adams, Doug (2010). The Music of The Lord of the Rings Films. Éditions Didier Carpentier. ISBN 978-0-7390-7157-1.
- Amendt-Raduege, Amy (2006). "Dream Visions in J.R.R. Tolkien's The Lord of the Rings". Tolkien Studies. 3 (1): 45–55. doi:10.1353/tks.2006.0002 – via Project Muse.
- Carpenter, Humphrey (1977). J. R. R. Tolkien: A Biography. New York: Ballantine Books. ISBN 978-0-04-928037-3.
- Carpenter, Humphrey, ed. (2023) [1981]. The Letters of J. R. R. Tolkien: Revised and Expanded Edition. New York: HarperCollins. ISBN 978-0-35-865298-4.
- Cameron, Rachael (1997). "A Freudian/post/Freudian reading of JRR Tolkien's The Hobbit: the Bilbo/Gollum encounter". Papers: Explorations into Children's Literature. 7 (3): 33–42.
- Flieger, Verlyn (2001) [1997]. A Question of Time: J.R.R. Tolkien's Road to Faërie. Kent State University Press. ISBN 978-0-87338-699-9.
- Greene, Dierdre (1996). "Higher Argument: Tolkien and the Tradition of Vision, Epic and Prophecy". Mythlore. 21 (33): 45–52.
- Groom, Nick (2023). Tolkien in the Twenty-First Century. New York and London: Pegasus Books. ISBN 978-1-63936-503-6.
- Hurwitz, David (1996). "Sallinen: Symphony 7". Classics Today.
- Kabir, Ananya Jahanara (2001). Paradise, Death and Doomsday in Anglo-Saxon Literature. Cambridge; New York: Cambridge University Press. ISBN 978-0-521-80600-8.
- Kelly, A. Keith; Livingston, Michael (2009). "'A Far Green Country': Tolkien, Paradise, and the End of All Things in Medieval Literature". Mythlore. 27 (3). Article 13.
- Kisor, Yvette (2021). ""The Lay of Aotrou and Itroun": Sexuality, Imagery, and Desire in Tolkien's Works". Tolkien Studies. 18 (1): 19–62. doi:10.1353/tks.2021.0005. ISSN 1547-3163.
- Kocher, Paul (1974) [1972]. Master of Middle-earth: The Achievement of J.R.R. Tolkien. Penguin Books. ISBN 0140038779.
- Lindsay, Sean (1987). "The Dream System in The Lord of the Rings". Mythlore. 13 (3): 7–14.
- Olsen, Corey (2008). "The Myth of the Ent and the Entwife". Tolkien Studies. 5 (1). Project Muse: 39–53. doi:10.1353/tks.0.0013.
- Reilly, R. James (1963). "Tolkien and the Fairy Story". Thought: A Review of Culture and Idea (Spring 1963).
- Shippey, Tom (2001). J. R. R. Tolkien: Author of the Century. HarperCollins. ISBN 978-0261-10401-3.
- Schoor, Karl (1983). "The Nature of Dreams in The Lord of the Rings". Mythlore. 10 (2): 21–30.
- Shore, Howard (13 December 2005). The Lord of the Rings: The Fellowship of the Ring: The Complete Recordings (PDF) (CD (booklet)). Reprise Records. 7418920.
- Tolkien, J. R. R. (1937). Douglas A. Anderson (ed.). The Annotated Hobbit. Boston: Houghton Mifflin (published 2002). ISBN 978-0-618-13470-0.
- Tolkien, J. R. R. (1954a). The Fellowship of the Ring. The Lord of the Rings. Boston: Houghton Mifflin. OCLC 9552942.
- Tolkien, J. R. R. (1954). The Two Towers. The Lord of the Rings. Boston: Houghton Mifflin. OCLC 1042159111.
- Tolkien, J. R. R. (1955). The Return of the King. The Lord of the Rings. Boston: Houghton Mifflin. OCLC 519647821.
- Tolkien, J. R. R. (2008). Flieger, Verlyn; Anderson, Douglas A. (eds.). Tolkien On Fairy-stories. HarperCollins. ISBN 978-0-00-724466-9.
- Tolkien, J. R. R. (1992). Christopher Tolkien (ed.). Sauron Defeated. Boston, New York, & London: Houghton Mifflin. ISBN 0-395-60649-7.
- Van Dyke, Laura N. (2024). "Tolkien in the Twenty-First Century: The Meaning of Middle-Earth Today by Nick Groom". Mythlore. 42 (2). Article 26.
