= Ælfwine (Tolkien) =

- First appearance: The Book of Lost Tales
- Created by: J. R. R. Tolkien

In-universe information
- Species: Man
- Gender: Male
- Spouse: Cwén; Naimi
- Children: Hengist (Cwén); Horsa (Cwén); Heorrenda (Naimi)
- Nationality: Anglo-Saxon

Ælfwine the mariner is a fictional character found in various early versions of J. R. R. Tolkien's legendarium. Tolkien envisaged Ælfwine as an Anglo-Saxon who visited and befriended the Elves and acted as the source of later mythology. Thus, in the frame story, Ælfwine is the stated author of the various translations in Old English that appear in the twelve-volume The History of Middle-earth edited by Christopher Tolkien.

== Frame story: early links with Britain ==
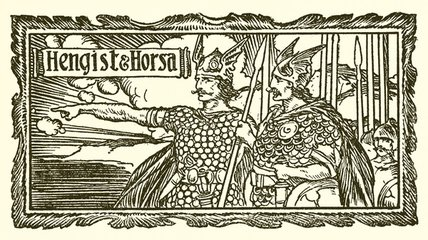
The brothers Hengest and Horsa are the legendary founders of England; in The Book of Lost Tales, Tolkien places Ælfwine as their father. Illustration from Edward Parrott's 1909 Pageant of British History

In The Book of Lost Tales, begun early in Tolkien's writing career, the character who becomes Ælfwine was initially named Ottor Wǽfre (called Eriol by the Elves). Ottor is a mariner; he calls himself Wǽfre, ('restless, wandering'). He settles on Heligoland and marries Cwén; they have sons Hengest and Horsa, (Note: Tolkien 1984, book 2, pp. 290–292) the names of the legendary founders of England. When Cwén dies, Ottor sets out again with the "sea-longing" and sails to find Tol Eressëa. Once there, he marries Naimi, niece of Vairë, one of the keepers of the Cottage of Lost Play. They have sons including Heorrenda who found the Engle people ('the English').

The tale of Ælfwine serves as a frame story for the tales of the Elves. Ælfwine set out from Heligoland on a voyage with a small crew but was the lone survivor after his ship crashed upon the rocks near an island. The island was inhabited by an old man who gave him directions to Eressëa. After he found the island the Elves hosted him in the Cottage of Lost Play and narrated their tales to him. He afterwards learned from the Elves that the old man he met was actually "Ylmir". He was taught most of the tales by the old Elf named Rúmil who is the lore master living on Eressëa. Eriol became more and more unhappy as a man and yearned constantly to be an Elf. He eventually finds out that he can become an elf with a drink of Limpë which he is denied by the leader of Kortirion on multiple occasions. (Note: Tolkien 1984, book 2, pp. 312–317)

In these early versions, Tol Eressea is seen as the island of Britain, near a smaller island of Ivenry (Ireland). He earned the name Ælfwine from the Elves he stayed with; his first wife, Cwén, was the mother of Hengest and Horsa; his second wife, Naimi, bore him a third son, Heorrenda, a great poet of half-Elven descent, who in the fiction would go on to write the Old English epic poem Beowulf. This weaves together a mythology for England, connecting England's geography, poetry and mythology with Tolkien's legendarium as a plausibly reconstructed prehistory.

=== A presented collection ===
The first title for The Book of Lost Tales was

- The Golden Book of Heorrenda
- being the book of the
- Tales of Tavrobel (Note: Tolkien 1984, book 2, p. 290)

The stories were thus, in the fiction, told to and transmitted by Eriol/Ælfwine, via Heorrenda's written book.

The Tolkien scholar Gergely Nagy writes that Tolkien "more and more emphatically thought of his works as texts within the fictional world" (his emphasis). Tolkien felt that this complex "double textuality" was critically important, giving the effect of being a real mythology, a collection of documents assembled and edited by different hands, whether Ælfwine's or Bilbo's or those of unnamed Númenóreans who had transmitted ancient Elvish texts, over a long period of time. Nagy notes that Tolkien's friend C. S. Lewis, like him a scholar of English literature, jokingly responded to Tolkien's 1925 The Lay of Leithian by writing a philological commentary on the text complete with invented names of scholars, conjectures as to the original text, and variant readings, as if the text had been discovered in an archive. One likely source for such a treatment, remarked by scholars including Tom Shippey, Flieger, Anne C. Petty, and Jason Fisher, is Elias Lönnrot's Finnish epic Kalevala, admired by Tolkien, which had been compiled and edited from a genuine tradition. Another such is Snorri Sturluson's Prose Edda, something that Tolkien studied intensively.

== Time-travelling elf-friend ==
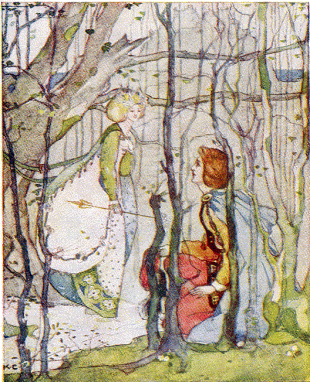
Time in Lothlórien was distorted, as it was in Elfland for Thomas the Rhymer; "Elf-friends" are able to place the different times of Elves and mortals in perspective, having a frame of reference from which to observe them. Illustration by Katherine Cameron, 1908

The Old English name Ælfwine means "Elf-friend", as does the later Quenya name Elendil. Ælfwine is a well-attested historical Germanic name, alongside its Old High German and Lombard equivalents, Alwin and Alboin, respectively.

All of these names were to be used in the unfinished novel The Lost Road, written around 1936–1937; it was intended as a tale of time travel, where descendants of Ælfwine experience racial memories or visions of their equivalently-named ancestors, connecting the present time (with the protagonist Alboin Errol) with the mythological. The time-series was to run all the way back to the fall of Númenor, envisaged as a lost island civilisation similar to Atlantis. The later unfinished novel The Notion Club Papers, written in 1945–1946 and published posthumously in Sauron Defeated, picks up the time travel and the "Elf-friend" names. The protagonist is Alwin Lowdham.

Frodo is linked to Tolkien's time-travelling frame story characters
Names meaning "Elf-friend" in The Lost Road				The Lord of the Rings
Lombardic	Old English	Old High German	Quenya (in Númenor)	Frodo's epithet, given by Gildor
Alboin	Ælfwine	Alwin	Elendil	"Elf-friend"

The Hobbit Frodo Baggins, a central figure in The Lord of the Rings, is given the informal title "Elf-friend" by an Elf, Gildor, whom he meets and addresses in Elvish. (Note: Tolkien 1954a, book 1, ch. 3, "Three Is Company") The Tolkien scholar Verlyn Flieger notes that this associates him with Ælfwine; she comments further that in the discussion between him and Sam Gamgee, Aragorn, and Legolas about the nature of time in the Elvish realm of Lothlórien, it endows him with a special authority as someone "unusually sensitive" to its mood, and in particular its "timeless quality". This is in the context of her analysis of how time differs between Lothlórien and what Frodo calls the "mortal lands" outside it. She writes that Ælfwine is what the engineer J. W. Dunne in his book An Experiment with Time described as a "Field 2 observer", effectively able to look down on observers in the lower dimension of time, Field 1, from their higher time dimension like someone in an aircraft seeing the situation of people on the ground below; and by association with Ælfwine, perhaps Frodo too is able to see Elvish time from a certain perspective.

== In the later legendarium ==
The Ælfwine frame story is not present in the published version of The Silmarillion, but Tolkien never fully abandoned a framework akin to the Ælfwine-tradition. Even after he had introduced the Red Book of Westmarch, supposedly compiled and translated by the Hobbit Bilbo Baggins as a framing concept, Ælfwine continued to have some role in the transition of The Silmarillion and other writings from Bilbo's translations into modern English. For example, the Narn i Hîn Húrin, which Christopher Tolkien dates to the period after the publication of The Lord of the Rings, (Note: Tolkien 1994, p. 314) has this introductory note: "Here begins that tale which Ǽlfwine made from the Húrinien." (Note: Tolkien 1994, p. 311)

Tolkien never fully dropped the idea of multiple 'voices' (such as of Rumil or Pengolodh in their "Golden Book") who supposedly collected the stories of both Mannish and Elvish sources over the millennia of the world's history. According to Christopher Tolkien, the Akallabêth, which was written in the voice of Pengolodh, in a version that his father had entitled "The Downfall of Númenor", begins "Of Men, Ælfwine, it is said by the Eldar that they came into the world in the time of the Shadow of Morgoth ..." He admits in the History of Middle-earth series that removing this destroyed the whole story's anchorage in the lore of the Eldarin elves, and led him to make changes to the end of the paragraph that would not have met with his father's approval. He points out that the last paragraph of Akallabêth, as published in the Silmarillion, still contains indirect references to Ælfwine and other 'future mariners'. (Note: Tolkien 1984, book 1, foreword)

This later Ælfwine was from England, and travelled west to reach the Straight Road, where he either visited the Lonely Island (Tol Eressëa) or only saw its Golden Book with the stories about the Elder Days, the time before the rule of Man, at a distance, or dreamed about the Outer Lands (Middle-earth). He was born in either the 10th or 11th century, and in some versions was connected to English royalty. (Note: Tolkien 1984, book 2, ch. 6 "The History of Eriol or Ælfwine and the End of the Tales")

== Sources ==
- Artamonova, Maria (2010). "Writing for an Anglo-Saxon audience in the twentieth century: J.R.R. Tolkien's Old English Chronicles". In Clark, David; Perkins, Nicholas (eds.). Anglo-Saxon Culture and the Modern Imagination. Cambridge: D. S. Brewer. pp. 71–88.
- Drout, Michael D. C. (2004). "A Mythology for Anglo-Saxon England". In Chance, Jane (ed.). Tolkien and the Invention of Myth: a Reader. University Press of Kentucky. pp. 229–247. ISBN 978-0-8131-2301-1.
- Flieger, Verlyn (2000). "The Footsteps of Ælfwine". In Flieger, Verlyn; Hostetter, Carl F. (eds.). Tolkien's Legendarium: Essays on The History of Middle-earth. Westport: Greenwood Press. pp. 183–198.
- Flieger, Verlyn (2001) [1997]. A Question of Time: J.R.R. Tolkien's Road to Faërie. Kent State University Press. ISBN 978-0-87338-699-9.
- Flieger, Verlyn (2005). Interrupted Music: The Making of Tolkien's Mythology. Kent State University Press.
- Honegger, Thomas (2013) [2007]. "Ælfwine (Old English "Elf-friend")". In Drout, Michael D. C. (ed.). J. R. R. Tolkien Encyclopedia. Oxford: Taylor & Francis. pp. 4–5.
- Nagy, Gergely (2020) [2014]. "The Silmarillion". In Lee, Stuart D. (ed.). A Companion to J. R. R. Tolkien. Wiley Blackwell. pp. 107–118. ISBN 978-1119656029.
- Shippey, Tom (2001). J. R. R. Tolkien: Author of the Century. HarperCollins. ISBN 978-0261-10401-3.
- Shippey, Tom (2005) [1982]. The Road to Middle-Earth: How J. R. R. Tolkien Created a New Mythology (Third ed.). HarperCollins. ISBN 978-0-261-10275-0.
- Tolkien, J. R. R. (1954a). The Fellowship of the Ring. The Lord of the Rings. Boston: Houghton Mifflin. OCLC 9552942.
- Tolkien, J. R. R. (1984). Christopher Tolkien (ed.). The Book of Lost Tales. Vol. 1. Boston: Houghton Mifflin. ISBN 0-395-35439-0.
- Tolkien, J. R. R. (1994). Christopher Tolkien (ed.). The War of the Jewels. Boston: Houghton Mifflin. ISBN 0-395-71041-3.
