= A Question of Time (book) =

Book of Tolkien scholarship

A Question of Time: J.R.R. Tolkien's Road to Faërie
- Author: Verlyn Flieger
- Subject: Tolkien's fiction
- Genre: Literary criticism
- Publisher: Wm. B. Eerdmans
- Publication date: 1997
- Media type: Print
- Pages: 276
- Preceded by: Splintered Light
- Followed by: Interrupted Music

A Question of Time: J.R.R. Tolkien's Road to Faërie is a 1997 book of literary analysis by Verlyn Flieger of J. R. R. Tolkien's explorations of the nature of time in his Middle-earth writings, interpreted in the light of J. W. Dunne's 1927 theory of time, and Dunne's view that dreams gave access to all dimensions of time. Tolkien read Dunne's book carefully and annotated his copy with his views of the theory. A Question of Time examines in particular Tolkien's two unfinished time-travel novels, The Lost Road and The Notion Club Papers, and the time-travel aspects of The Lord of the Rings. These encompass Frodo's dreams and the land of the Elves, Lothlórien.

Other scholars have admired the book, commenting that Tolkien's writings both explore time and stand outside it. They state that he explored the contradictions in having time passing at different rates, such as in the Elvish land of Lothlórien, and that he used time and travel to provide escape, as fairy tales do. Flieger won the 1998 Mythopoeic Award for Inklings studies for the book.

== Context ==
=== Tolkien's fiction ===
The philologist and fantasy author J. R. R. Tolkien spent much of his life constructing his legendarium, a body of writings on his fictional world of Middle-earth. He is best known for his children's book The Hobbit and his fantasy novel The Lord of the Rings, both set in Middle-earth.

=== Author ===
Verlyn Flieger is a scholar of English literature. She is known also as a Tolkien scholar, including for her books on Tolkien's legendarium, Splintered Light and Interrupted Music. She has won the Mythopoeic Scholarship Award for her work on Tolkien's Middle-earth writings.

== Book ==
=== Summary ===
Flieger analyses the influence of the aeronautical engineer J. W. Dunne on Tolkien. Tolkien's copy of the third edition of Dunne's 1927 non-fiction book An Experiment with Time contains handwritten annotations which show that "he understood Dunne's theory yet did not completely agree with it." Flieger shows that Tolkien "undoubtedly" used Dunne's "dream mechanism" for his two unfinished time-travel novels, namely The Lost Road and The Notion Club Papers. Since in Dunne's view dreams give access to all of time, they can provide visions of the future as well as of the past. Flieger describes The Lost Road as having a father and a son who go back in time using "racial memory and serial identity". Tolkien's novel mixed Dunne's ideas with those in the pseudonymously published 1911 An Adventure, which introduced the idea of memory transfer. Flieger suggests that the idea of the Lost Straight Road embodied in the novel's title stems from "the deliberate presentation of time as space." The Notion Club Papers again looks at time travel by way of dreams.

Alongside the analysis of the time-travel novels, Flieger examines the nature of time in Lothlórien, the seemingly timeless land of Elves in The Lord of the Rings. She also analyses Tolkien's use of dreams in that novel, especially those of the Hobbit protagonist, Frodo.

Flieger concludes that "When we read his work we—like Ramer [in The Notion Club Papers]—fall 'wide asleep' into a dream more real than ordinary waking experience. We come out of it with a new perception of the present, waking world."

The book is illustrated with a small number of black-and-white images, diagrams of different conceptions of the flow of time.

=== Publication history ===
A Question of Time was first published by Kent State University Press in 1997, in both cloth and paperback formats. The paperback was reprinted in 2001.

== Reception ==
A Question of Time won the 1998 Mythopoeic Award for Inklings studies. David Bratman, in Mythlore, writes that the book "set the standard for scholarship" on The History of Middle-earth.

Richard C. West, in Journal of the Fantastic in the Arts, writes that Flieger places Tolkien both as a man of his time, among the Inklings and other authors including modernist writers, and "quite ready to travel outside it." Tolkien was certainly, West notes, quite dissatisfied with H. G. Wells's time machine approach, finding Dunne's theory more congenial. In West's view, Flieger "admirably" sums up what he was hoping to do in The Lost Road: "Tolkien's grand design, had it come to fruition, would have interwoven selected episodes of Western history with suggestions of his own personal and familial history and made it all the epilogue to his own mythology", which West glosses as "a project worthy of [the modernist writer James] Joyce." Noting that Dunne believed that dreams could "[open] the mind to the whole field of time", he comments that Frodo's dreams are "significant" for the story in The Lord of the Rings, "thus marking him out as an exceptional individual". West ends by stating that Flieger "writes well", and that the "major" book would be one "that all Tolkien scholars should read."

Carol Leibiger, also in Journal of the Fantastic in the Arts, calls A Question of Time and Flieger's earlier book Splintered Light "two valuable and highly readable critical studies of Tolkien's work." She describes the former as a study of his "use of travel in time and space to achieve the escape that is a function of fairy stories." Leibiger calls Flieger's suggestion that for Frodo, "the entire Ring quest has been a dream" an "extreme position"; she suggests that Flieger might have said this to link The Lord of the Rings to the two unfinished time-travel novels.

The theologian Ralph C. Wood, writing in VII, comments that Flieger persuasively argues that Tolkien's work is enduring because it tries to join the "traditional Christian world of angels and demons and dream-visions" with "the modern world where space and time have been radically relativized" by science, psychology, and fiction. In his view, Flieger's point in the book is that Tolkien created his invented worlds "to show the possibility of inhabiting a world where events are synchronous rather than successive", in other words that time is not just a linear flow but "also cyclical and mythical." Wood finds Flieger best in her analyses of Lothlórien, of Frodo's dreams, and the two unfinished time-travel novels. In his view, Flieger presents "a darker, less cheering Tolkien than many of his Christian apologists have acknowledged", and he thinks she was right, as Tolkien was "doubt-filled". But he finds her much less illuminating of The Lord of the Rings. In particular, Wood writes, she misses Tolkien's "deliberate resistance to the occult and the psychic", instead taking the Christian view that God "subjected himself to the conditions of time", leading to the one-off "unrepeatable, space-time events" of the death and resurrection of Christ.

C. T. Fitzgerald, in Extrapolation, wrote that Flieger's book takes readers to an additional level of understanding of The Lord of the Rings beyond the simple "satisfied warm glow—feeling all is right with the world". A reading of her book would benefit, Fitzgerald writes, from reading The History of Middle-earth and Tolkien's minor works including Smith of Wootton Major, even if it does not require that. The book both explores Tolkien's use of time, and presents him "as a cutting-edge modern writer".

John Ellison, in Mallorn, writes that Flieger's contention in the book is that all Tolkien's writings, especially The Lord of the Rings, need to be read, with reference to J. W. Dunne, both as sequences of events in linear time, "and as a unity outside that experience." Ellison notes that Tolkien was interested in "escape into past time", and that this found expression in his agreement to write a time travel story (The Lost Road) while C. S. Lewis wrote a space travel story. For Tolkien, the challenge was to find a convincing way of entering and leaving the past world. Contradictions arose, and Tolkien abandoned the story; but the theme reappeared in The Lord of the Rings: if Lothlórien was in the past, and time actually did not pass there, or passed more slowly, then how, Flieger asks, could a traveller emerge into the world outside into a different time? Tolkien, Ellison writes, chose a compromise: perhaps time just seemed to slow down. He states that the book is not easy to read, Flieger's style being "often rather dense and convoluted", and sometimes repetitive. That said, he calls it "a major addition to Tolkien scholarship", more than repaying "serious attention".

== Sources ==
- Carpenter, Humphrey (1977). J. R. R. Tolkien: A Biography. New York: Ballantine Books. ISBN 978-0-04-928037-3.
- Flieger, Verlyn (1983). Splintered Light: Logos and Language in Tolkien's World. Wm B. Eerdmans Publishing. ISBN 978-0-8028-1955-0.
- Flieger, Verlyn (2001) [1997]. A Question of Time. Kent, Ohio: Kent State University Press. ISBN 978-0-87338-699-9.
