= Interrupted Music =

Book of Tolkien scholarship

Interrupted Music: The Making of Tolkien's Mythology
- Author: Verlyn Flieger
- Subject: Tolkien's legendarium
- Genre: Literary criticism
- Publisher: Kent State University Press
- Publication date: 2005
- Media type: Print
- Pages: 172
- ISBN: 978-0-87338-824-5
- Preceded by: A Question of Time

Interrupted Music is a 2005 book of literary analysis by Verlyn Flieger of J. R. R. Tolkien's legendarium, the mass of documents summarized in The Silmarillion. Despite its title, it is not about Tolkien's use of music; it explores how and why he set about creating a mythology for England, what models he used as a guide – especially Elias Lönnrot and Arthurian legend, and how he made the mythology resemble a real one. The book has been well received by scholars; they have stated that the chapter on how Tolkien made the legendarium seem like a genuine tradition is the most important in the book.

== Context ==
=== Tolkien's fiction ===
The philologist and fantasy author J. R. R. Tolkien spent much of his life constructing his legendarium, a body of writings on his fictional world of Middle-earth. He is best known for his children's book The Hobbit and his fantasy novel The Lord of the Rings, both set in Middle-earth.

=== Author ===
Verlyn Flieger is a scholar of English literature. She is also known as a Tolkien scholar, including for her books on Tolkien's legendarium, Splintered Light and A Question of Time. She has won the Mythopoeic Scholarship Award for her work on Tolkien's Middle-earth writings.

== Book ==
=== Summary ===
The book's title alludes to the music of creation in the Ainulindalë at the start of The Silmarillion; the music is interrupted by the evil Melkor, spoiling the world of Arda. The book is not about Tolkien's use of music as such.

The book is in three parts. Part 1 examines Tolkien's "body of connected legend", which he intended as a mythology for England. The four chapters assess Tolkien's motives for attempting this; the models available to him, including people such as Elias Lönnrot who assembled the Finnish epic poem, the Kalevala, and literary traditions such as Arthurian legend; points of view on the mythology; and the way Tolkien assembled a literary tradition. Flieger states that Tolkien presents The Lord of the Rings at four levels: "as the story itself; as one version of that story embodying references to other versions; as a historical artifact—the Red Book; [and] as a modern edition of that book complete with scholarly and critical apparatus".

Part 2 describes how Tolkien intended to present his legendarium, in particular by framing it with a time-travelling visitor such as Eriol/Ælfwine the mariner.

Part 3 looks at Celtic influences on Tolkien. He had stated that he disliked the Celtic in a letter, but Flieger notes that he also said that his mythology should possess "the fair elusive beauty that some call Celtic". The influences she identifies include the Celtic otherworld, stories of "sunken or engulfed lands" like Tolkien's Númenor, and the immram tradition of wandering sea-voyages.

=== Publication history ===
Interrupted Music was first published by Kent State University Press in 2005, in paperback format. The book is not illustrated, other than the use of Ted Nasmith's The Incoming Sea at the Rainbow Cleft on the cover.

== Reception ==
=== Whole book ===
David Bratman, in Mythlore, describes Interrupted Music as "a full-length meditation on the framing of the series" of 12 volumes of The History of Middle-earth. Gergely Nagy, in Tolkien Studies, writes that the book proves that Flieger is a "good established Tolkien critic", and in particular that she is "a critic whose work can be built on." Shelley Gurney writes in Utopian Studies that Flieger "deals eloquently and concisely with the fundamental ideas behind ... Tolkien's mythology", and that she considers Flieger "the foremost scholar in research on The Silmarillion".

Cami Agan writes in Mythlore that Flieger's books "establish Tolkien's grounding in [literary] sources ... [and] offer scintillating readings of Tolkien's themes, his processes of revision and recasting, and the resulting complexity of Middle-earth which he dedicated 'to England'". She adds that Interrupted Music uses "Tolkien's conception of creation as Music in order to explore the complex process of composition" of his legendarium.

The Tolkien scholar Elizabeth Whittingham comments that in Interrupted Music, Flieger "comes closest to achieving what she sets out to do [in comparison to her books Splintered Light and A Question of Time], that is to undertake 'a comparison of the texts for the purpose of discovering patterns or movement in any direction'". Whittingham adds that Flieger's method of working is to trace Tolkien's many changes to his legendarium texts, searching for patterns of significant evolution in his mythic elements like "cosmogony, theogony, cosmology, thanatology and eschatology".

The Christian linguist Oliver Stegen writes that readers interested in linguistics with a reasonable knowledge of Tolkien's Middle-earth writings will discover "eye-opening parallels" with wider language studies.

The Catholic author Stratford Caldecott praised Interrupted Music as joining the ranks of the "most fascinating books" of Tolkien scholarship, alongside Flieger's Splintered Light. He noted that the title could be taken both as a description of the Great Music at the start of The Silmarillion, and of Tolkien's never-finished legendarium. He quoted Flieger's description of her subject, the legendarium, as "an unfinished symphony whose implications outrun its execution". In his view, Flieger worked on three topics: tracing the evolution of the legendarium; discovering the "multitudinous" influences on Tolkien as he wrote; and Tolkien's effort to make the work a mythology for England.

Elizabeth Renneisen offers the criticism that "If Flieger's purpose is to offer a definitive outline of Tolkien's brilliant attempt at an English mythology, she falls short of success", adding however that Flieger certainly succeeds in encouraging readers to speculate about Tolkien's mythology.

=== Chapter 4: "The Tradition" ===
Thomas Fornet-Ponse, in VII, writes that the tradition chapter shows how "Tolkien depicts his work like a true mythology with different layering, multiple narrators, overlapping texts and variant versions."

Nagy considers the chapter on the tradition of the legendarium "an admirable synthesis", and "the most important part of the book", and that Tolkien's self-referentiality is "very effectively reflected on".

Gurney states that the tradition chapter is "the most significant", showing how the legendarium "adheres to the established mythic tradition" by illustrating each means of transmission of myths in The Lord of the Rings. She comments that she found the book straightforward to read, but cautions that readers without "a passing knowledge of at least some of Tolkien's sources" might find it "confusing".

== Sources ==
- Carpenter, Humphrey (1977). J. R. R. Tolkien: A Biography. New York: Ballantine Books. ISBN 978-0-04-928037-3.
- Flieger, Verlyn (1983). Splintered Light: Logos and Language in Tolkien's World. Wm B. Eerdmans Publishing. ISBN 978-0-8028-1955-0.
- Flieger, Verlyn (2001) [1997]. A Question of Time. Kent, Ohio: Kent State University Press. ISBN 978-0-87338-699-9.
- Flieger, Verlyn (2005). Interrupted Music. Kent, Ohio: Kent State University Press. ISBN 978-0-87338-824-5.
