= The Notion Club Papers =

Unfinished novel by J. R. R. Tolkien

The Notion Club Papers is an abandoned novel by J. R. R. Tolkien, written in 1945 and published posthumously in Sauron Defeated, the 9th volume of The History of Middle-earth. It is a time travel story, written while The Lord of the Rings was being developed. The Notion Club is a fictionalization of Tolkien's own such club, the Inklings. Tolkien's mechanism for the exploration of time is through lucid dreams. These allow club members to experience events as far back as the destruction of the Atlantis-like island of Númenor, as narrated in The Silmarillion.

The unfinished text of The Notion Club Papers runs for some 120 pages in Sauron Defeated, accompanied by 40 pages of Christopher Tolkien's commentary and notes, with examples of the pages hand-written by his father.

== Context ==
J. R. R. Tolkien was a scholar of English literature, a philologist and a medievalist interested in language and poetry from the Middle Ages, especially that of Anglo-Saxon England and Northern Europe. His professional knowledge of Beowulf, telling of a pagan world but with a Christian narrator, helped to shape his fictional world of Middle-earth. His intention to create what has been called "a mythology for England" led him to construct not only stories but a fully-formed world, Middle-earth, with invented languages, peoples, cultures, and history. Among his many influences were his own Roman Catholic faith, medieval languages and literature, including Norse mythology. He is best known as the author of the high fantasy works The Hobbit (1937), The Lord of the Rings (1954–1955), and The Silmarillion (1977), all set in Middle-earth.

== Structure and plot ==
The story revolves around the meetings of an Oxford arts discussion group, the Notion Club. During these meetings, Alwin Arundel Lowdham discusses his lucid dreams about Númenor, a lost civilisation connected with Atlantis and with Tolkien's Middle-earth. Through these dreams, he "discovers" much about the Númenor story and the languages of Middle-earth (notably Quenya, Sindarin, and Adûnaic). While not finished, at the end of the given story it becomes clear Lowdham himself is a reincarnation of sorts of Elendil, leader of the men who escaped the destruction of Númenor. Other members of the Club mention their vivid dreams of other times and places.

The Notion Club Papers is elaborately constructed. The main story (the Notion Club, itself the frame of the Númenor story) is set within a frame story. Both are set in the future, after the actual time of writing, 1945. Embedded within the story are Tolkien's versions of European legends: King Sheave, and The Death of St. Brendan, a three-page poem also titled 'Imram'.

In the frame story, a Mr. Howard Green finds documents in sacks of waste paper at Oxford in 2012. These documents, the Notion Club Papers of the title, are the incomplete notes of meetings of the Notion Club; these meetings are said to have occurred in the 1980s. The notes, written by one of the participants, include references to events that 'occurred' in the 1970s and 1980s. Green publishes a first edition containing excerpts from the documents. Two scholars read the first edition, ask to examine the documents, and then submit a full report. The "Notes to the Second Edition" mentions the contradictory evidence in dating the documents, and an alternative date is presented: they may have been written in the 1940s.

== Writing and publication ==
J. R. R. Tolkien wrote several unfinished drafts of The Notion Club Papers in 1945. The 120-page fragment was published posthumously by George Allen & Unwin in the UK and by Houghton Mifflin in the US, within Sauron Defeated, the 9th volume of The History of Middle-earth, in 1992. The book includes in addition some 40 pages of Christopher Tolkien's commentary and notes on the abandoned novel, and reproduces examples of pages hand-written by his father.

== Analysis ==
=== Literary group ===
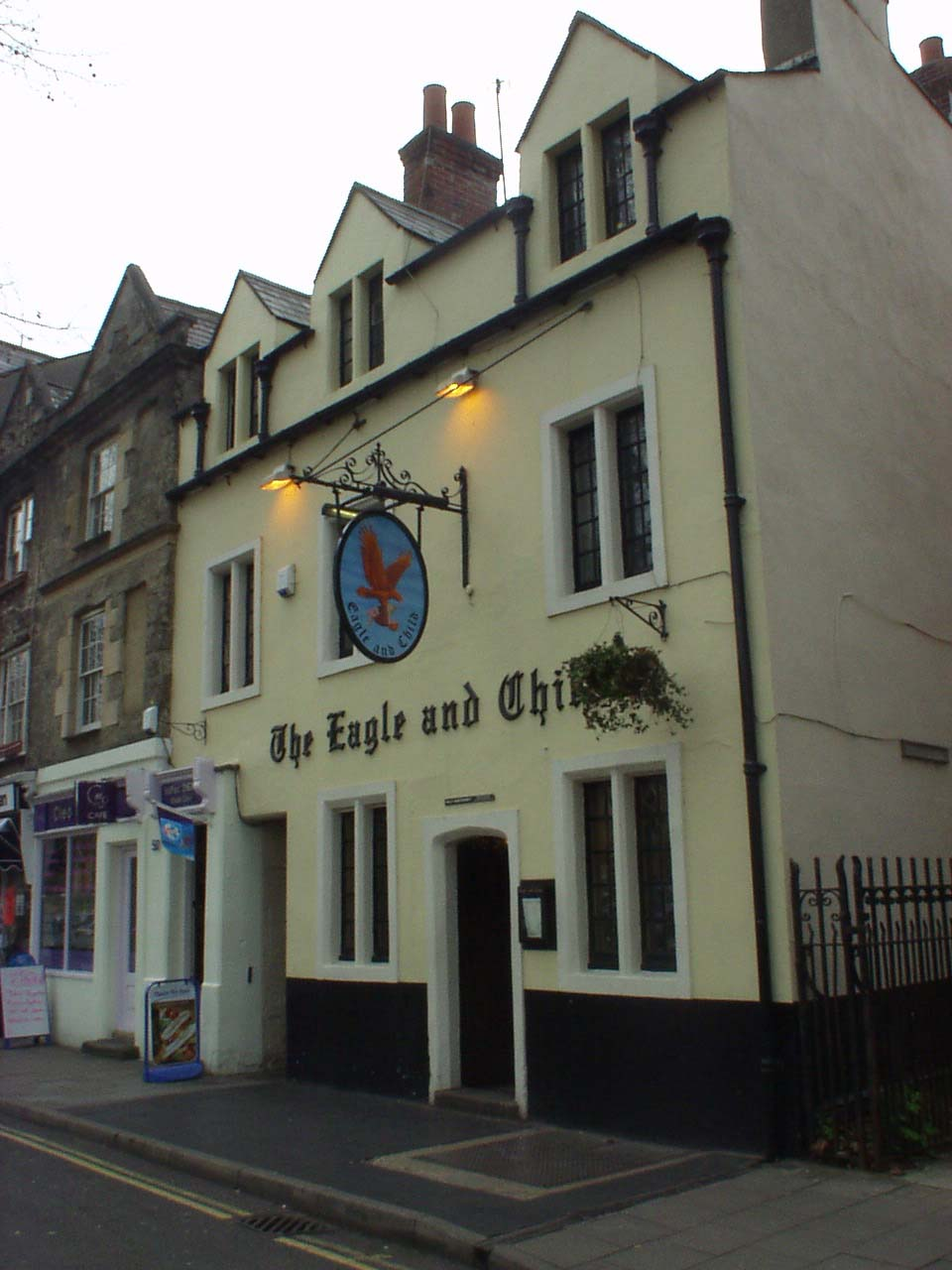
The Inklings met on Tuesday mornings during term in Oxford's The Eagle and Child pub.

The text comments on C. S. Lewis's Space Trilogy. Lewis and Tolkien were close friends and members of the Inklings literary club. The two men had agreed to write space travel (Lewis) and time travel (Tolkien) novels, since they agreed there were too few stories in existence that they really liked. Tolkien's remarks on the trilogy are similar in style to Lewis's commentary on Tolkien's poem The Lay of Leithian, in which he created a fictional history of scholarship of the poem and even referred to other manuscript traditions to recommend changes to the poem. Tolkien's biographer, Humphrey Carpenter, describes The Notion Club as a "thinly disguised" version of the Inklings, noting that the time travellers are two Oxford dons who are members of the club.

=== Time travel ===
Navigable diagram of Tolkien's legendarium. The two unfinished time travel novels served as a source of ideas for The Lord of the Rings.

The Notion Club Papers may be seen as an attempt to re-write the incomplete The Lost Road (written around 1936-1937), being another attempt to tie the Númenórean legend in with a more modern tale through time travel. It follows the then-popular theory of J. W. Dunne, who had suggested in his 1927 An Experiment with Time that dreams could combine memories of both past and future events, and that time could flow differently for observers in different dimensions. The modern name "Alwin", the Old English name "Ælfwine", and the Quenya name "Elendil" all mean "Elf-friend"; in The Lost Road, the story involves father-son characters named Edwin/Elwin, Eadwine/Aelfwine, Audoin/Alboin, Amandil/Elendil, all meaning "Bliss-friend/Elf-friend", as the pair travel successively further back in time all the way through history to Númenor, just as the protagonists of The Notion Club Papers do in their lucid dreams. This situates Númenor, whose downfall is described in The Silmarillion, as part of an invented mythology for England. Tolkien's biographer John Garth adds that The Notion Club Papers character Lowdham's middle name, Arundel, is both an English place-name and an echo of the legendarium's Éarendel (an ancestor of Elendil).

Names of Tolkien's frame story characters reincarnated in different times
Relation	Germanic	Old English	Meaning	Modern name	Quenya (in Númenor)
Father	Alboin	Ælfwine	Elf-friend	Alwin, Elwin, Aldwin	Elendil
Son	Audoin	Eadwine	Bliss-friend	Edwin	Herendil
—	—	Oswine	God-friend	Oswin, cf. Oswald	Valandil ("Valar-friend")

Both stories however break off before much time-travelling takes place. Tolkien finally managed to incorporate literary explorations of time in The Lord of the Rings, in the form of a visit to what seems to be the deep past in the Elvish land of Lothlorien, following a tradition that in Elfland, time is different; the stay lasts a month, but feels like only a few days. According to Christopher Tolkien, had his father continued The Notion Club Papers, he would have linked the real world of Alwin Lowdham with his eponymous ancestor Ælfwine of England, the fictional compiler of The Book of Lost Tales, and with Atlantis. One of the members of the Notion Club, Michael George Ramer, combines lucid dreams with time-travel and experiences the tsunami that sank Númenor. He cannot tell if it is history, or fantasy, or something in between. Verlyn Flieger writes that the journeying about of the protagonist recalls the Celtic Imram voyages, noting that Tolkien wrote a poem named "Imram" at the same time, and it was the only element published in his lifetime.

Virginia Luling writes of The Notion Club Papers that "Tolkien had reason to abandon it: the existing chapters are unsuccessful, though with gleams." Flieger comments that had either The Lost Road or The Notion Club Papers been finished,

we would have had a dream of time-travel through actual history and recorded myth which would have functioned as both introduction and epilogue to Tolkien's own invented mythology. The result would have been time-travel not on the scale of ordinary science fiction but of epic, a dream of myth and history and fiction interlocking as Tolkien wanted them to, as they might well once have done.

=== Prophecy ===
The Notion Club Papers mentions a great storm in England, on 12 June 1987. The actual Great Storm of 1987 occurred in October of that year. Christopher Tolkien drew attention to this, saying "my father's 'prevision' was only out by four months".

== Sources ==
- Carpenter, Humphrey (1977). J. R. R. Tolkien: A Biography. New York: Ballantine Books. ISBN 978-0-04-928037-3.
- Carpenter, Humphrey, ed. (2023) [1981]. The Letters of J. R. R. Tolkien: Revised and Expanded Edition. New York: HarperCollins. ISBN 978-0-35-865298-4.
- Chance, Jane (2003). Tolkien the Medievalist. Routledge. ISBN 978-0-415-47348-4. OCLC 53706034.
- Fisher, Jason (January 2007). "Sauron Defeated". In Drout, Michael D. C. (ed.). The J. R. R. Tolkien Encyclopedia. CRC Press. p. 593. ISBN 978-0-415-96942-0.
- Flieger, Verlyn (2005). "The Otherworld: Drowned Lands". Interrupted Music: The Making Of Tolkien's Mythology. Kent State University Press. pp. 125–136. ISBN 978-0-87338-824-5.
- Flieger, Verlyn (2001). "Where the Dream-fish Go". A Question of Time: J. R. R. Tolkien's Road to Faėriė. Kent State University Press. pp. 117–141. ISBN 978-0-87338-699-9.
- Shippey, Tom (2005) [1982]. The Road to Middle-Earth: How J. R. R. Tolkien Created a New Mythology (Third ed.). HarperCollins. ISBN 978-0-261-10275-0.
- Tolkien, J. R. R. (1977). Christopher Tolkien (ed.). The Silmarillion. Boston: Houghton Mifflin. ISBN 978-0-395-25730-2.
- Tolkien, J. R. R. (1992). Christopher Tolkien (ed.). Sauron Defeated. Boston, New York, & London: Houghton Mifflin. ISBN 0-395-60649-7.
