= Red Book of Westmarch =

Fictional manuscript written by hobbits, a conceit of author J. R. R. Tolkien

The Red Book of Westmarch (sometimes the Thain's Book (Note: Tolkien 1954a, Prologue, "Note on the Shire Records") after its principal version) is a fictional manuscript written by hobbits, related to the author J. R. R. Tolkien's frame stories. It is an instance of the found manuscript literary device, to explain the source of his legendarium. In the fiction, it is a collection of writings in which the events of The Hobbit and The Lord of the Rings were recounted by their characters, and from which Tolkien supposedly derived these and other works. The name of the book comes from its red leather binding and casing, and from its having been housed in the Westmarch, a region of Middle-earth next to the Shire.

In reality, Tolkien modelled its name on the Red Book of Hergest, and followed a tradition in English literature established by Samuel Richardson in the 18th century. He was also attempting, according to the scholar Gergely Nagy, to fit The Lord of the Rings into his presentation of his legendarium as a genuine-seeming collection of tales and myths, by ascribing the documents to the hobbit Bilbo Baggins.

== Fictional development ==
The Red Book of Westmarch is part of Tolkien's framing of The Hobbit as part of a long tradition of manuscripts, which he happened to have found.

=== There and Back Again ===
In The Hobbit, Tolkien writes of the protagonist and title character Bilbo Baggins composing his memoirs. Bilbo thinks of calling his work There and Back Again, A Hobbit's Holiday. (Note: Tolkien 1937, "The Last Stage") Tolkien's full name for the novel is indeed The Hobbit or There and Back Again. (Note: Tolkien 1937, Title page)

In The Lord of the Rings, this record is said to be written in his red leather-bound diary. Bilbo says to Gandalf that his intended ending would be him living "happily ever after to the end of his days". (Note: Tolkien 1954a book 1, ch. 1 "A Long-expected Party") This is in fact a rephrased line from the final chapter of The Hobbit, originally conveyed through third-person narrative voice.

=== The Downfall of the Lord of the Rings ===
Bilbo expands his memoirs into a record of the events of The Lord of the Rings, including the exploits of his kinsman Frodo Baggins and others. He leaves the material for Frodo to complete and organize. (Note: Tolkien 1955 book 6, ch. 6 "Many Partings") Frodo writes down the bulk of the final work, using Bilbo's diary and "many pages of loose notes". At the close of Tolkien's main narrative, the work is almost complete, and Frodo leaves the task to his gardener Samwise Gamgee. (Note: Tolkien 1955, book 6, ch. 9 "The Grey Havens")

In the last chapter of The Return of the King, Tolkien provides a "title page" for the Red Book of Westmarch inscribed with a succession of rejected titles. The final title is Frodo's:

~~My Diary.~~ ~~My Unexpected Journey.~~ ~~There and Back Again. And~~
~~What Happened After.~~

~~Adventures of Five Hobbits.~~ ~~The Tale of the Great Ring, compiled by~~
~~Bilbo Baggins from his own observations and the accounts of his friends.~~
~~What we did in the War of the Ring.~~

THE DOWNFALL
OF THE
LORD OF THE RINGS
AND THE
RETURN OF THE KING

(as seen by the Little People; being the memoirs of Bilbo
and Frodo of the Shire, supplemented by the accounts of
their friends and the learning of the Wise.)

Together with extracts from Books of Lore translated by
Bilbo in Rivendell.

=== Translations from the Elvish ===
Bilbo had translated material from Elvish lore from the Elder Days. This work, Translations from the Elvish, by B.B., comprised three volumes, also bound in red leather. After the defeat of Sauron (the Lord of the Rings) Bilbo gives these volumes to Frodo. These four volumes were "probably" (according to Tolkien) kept in a single red case.

=== Red Book ===
The volumes then pass into the keeping of Samwise Gamgee, Frodo's servant and later mayor of the Shire. In time, the volumes are left in the care of Sam's eldest daughter, Elanor Fairbairn, and her descendants (the Fairbairns of the Towers or Wardens of Westmarch). A fifth volume containing Hobbit genealogical tables and commentaries is composed and added at unknown dates, presumably over a long period of time, by unknown hands in Westmarch. This collection of writings is collectively called the Red Book of Westmarch.

=== Thain's Book ===
Tolkien states that the original Red Book of Westmarch was not preserved, but that several copies, with various notes and later additions, were made. The first copy was made at the request of King Elessar of Arnor and Gondor, and was brought to Gondor by Thain Peregrin I, who had been one of Frodo's companions. This copy was known as The Thain's Book and "contained much that was later omitted or lost". In Gondor it underwent much annotation and correction, particularly regarding Elvish languages. Also added was a short version of The Tale of Aragorn and Arwen by Faramir's grandson Barahir.

The story then runs that a copy of a revised and expanded Thain's Book was made probably by request of Peregrin's great-grandson and delivered to the Shire. It was written by the scribe Findegil and stored at the Took residence in Great Smials. Tolkien says this copy was important because it alone contained the whole of Bilbo's Translations from the Elvish.

This version somehow survives until Tolkien's time, and he translates the Red Book from the original languages into English and other representative languages or varieties, such as Old English for Rohirric. (Note: Tolkien 1955, Appendix F, "On Translation")

=== Related works ===
A similar work in some respects was the fictional Yearbook of Tuckborough, the annals of the Took family of hobbits of Tuckborough. It was described as the oldest known book in the Shire, and was most likely kept at the Great Smials of Tuckborough. The story runs that it was begun around the year T.A. 2000 and chronicled events dating from the foundation of the Shire in T.A. 1601 onwards. For comparison, the narrative in The Lord of the Rings commences in the year T.A. 3001.

The Yearbook recorded births, deaths, marriages, land-sales, and other events in Took history. Much of this information was later included in the Red Book of Westmarch. Tolkien wrote that it was also known as the Great Writ of Tuckborough and the Yellowskin, suggesting that it was bound in yellow leather or some other yellow material. Tolkien mentions several other supposedly historical documents related to the Red Book, but it is unclear whether these were integrated into editions. These works include the Tale of Years (part of which was used as the timeline for The Lord of the Rings) and Herblore of the Shire, supposedly written by Frodo's contemporary Meriadoc Brandybuck, used for information about pipe-weed.

== Relationship to Tolkien's Middle-earth books ==
As a memoir and history, the contents of the Red Book correspond to Tolkien's work as follows:

Red Book of Westmarch	Tolkien's writings
Bilbo's journey	The Hobbit
Frodo's journey	The Lord of the Rings
Background information	the Appendices to The Lord of the Rings, essays such as those in Unfinished Tales and The History of Middle-earth
Hobbit poetry and legends, scattered throughout the margins of the text of Bilbo and Frodo's journeys	The Adventures of Tom Bombadil
Bilbo's translation of Elven histories and legends	The Silmarillion

However, according to the Tolkien scholar Vladimir Brljak, readers are probably not intended to imagine Tolkien's published works as direct translations from the fictitious Red Book, but rather as Tolkien's own scholarly and literary adaptations of this supposed source material.

Some events and details concerning Gollum and the magic ring in the first edition of The Hobbit were rewritten for The Lord of the Rings. The Hobbit was later revised for consistency. Tolkien explains the discrepancies as Bilbo's lies (influenced by the ring, now the sinister One Ring).

== Analysis ==
The Tolkien scholar Mark T. Hooker writes that the Red Book of Westmarch owes its name to a collection of Welsh history and poetry including the Mabinogion, the 15th century Red Book of Hergest.

A scholarly allusion
	Tolkien	Lady Charlotte Guest
Role	Ostensibly translating Hobbit manuscripts from Westron	Translating medieval Welsh stories from manuscripts
Title	The Red Book of Westmarch	The Red Book of Hergest
Content	A mythology for England	The Mabinogion, a mythology for Wales

The title There and Back Again represents an archetypal Hobbit outlook on adventures. Frodo looks upon the going "there and back again" as an ideal throughout The Lord of the Rings similar to the Greek concept of νόστος (nostos, a heroic return). In the Tolkien scholar Richard C. West's view, Tolkien's Red Book is a pastiche of scholarship. It functions, he writes, as what scholars would call a spurious source, but the authority it imparts is by an appeal not to the old and familiar, but to the modern mystique of scholarly research. The "found manuscript conceit", employed by Tolkien to situate The Hobbit as a part of The Red Book of Westmarch, has been used in English literature since Samuel Richardson's novels Pamela; or, Virtue Rewarded (1740) and Clarissa; or, The History of a Young Lady (1747–1748); Tolkien used it also in his incomplete time travel novel, The Notion Club Papers.

Gergely Nagy notes that Tolkien wanted to present the complex set of writings of his legendarium as a seemingly-genuine collection of tales and myths within the frame of his fictional Middle-earth; he modified The Lord of the Rings to ascribe the documents to Bilbo, supposedly written in the years he spent in Rivendell, and preserved in the fictitious Red Book of Westmarch.

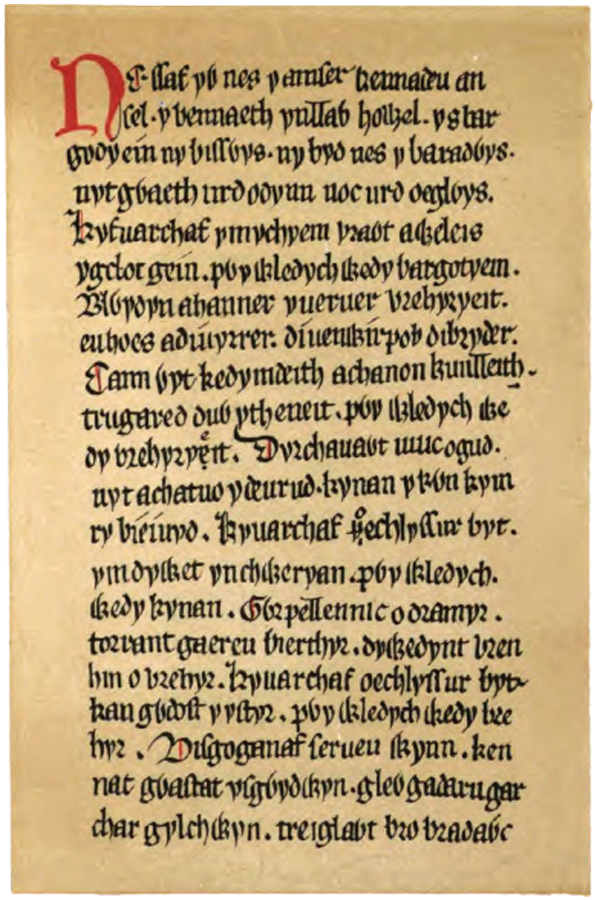
The Red Book of Hergest inspired Tolkien to invent the Red Book of Westmarch.

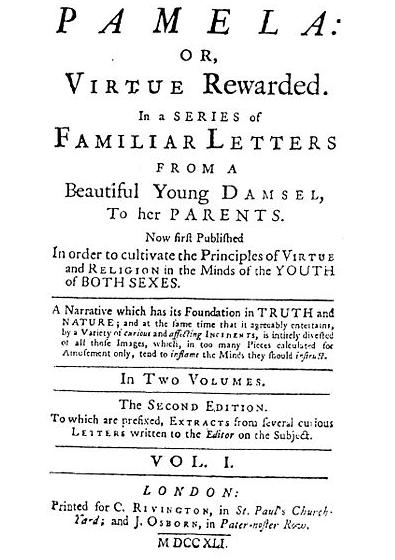
Tolkien was following the tradition of Samuel Richardson's 1740 novel Pamela; or, Virtue Rewarded in the conceit of a found manuscript.

== Adaptations ==
Bilbo writing There and Back Again in Peter Jackson's The Fellowship of the Ring with the subtitle "A Hobbit's Tale"

In Peter Jackson's The Fellowship of the Ring, There and Back Again provided the basis for the voiceover for the scene "Concerning Hobbits". This was greatly extended in the Special Extended Edition. Bilbo's writing of it provides his motive for wanting privacy in the film, substituting for a more complicated situation in the novel. Bilbo only says his line about his intended "happy ending" after he gives up the One Ring. The exchange is designed to symbolise Bilbo's unburdening from the great weight of the ring; this frees him to choose his own story's ending. In Jackson's film version, the book that Bilbo hands over to Frodo is subtitled A Hobbit's Tale rather than A Hobbit's Holiday. The Red Book in full (rather than just its title page) appears at the end of The Lord of the Rings: The Return of the King. In 1974, Houghton Mifflin Harcourt published a one-volume edition of The Lord of the Rings, bound in red imitation leather.

== See also ==
- Frame story
- Story within a story
- Pseudotranslation in The Lord of the Rings
