= Splintered Light =

Book of literary criticism of Tolkien's Middle-earth

Splintered Light: Logos and Language in Tolkien's World
- Author: Verlyn Flieger
- Subject: The Silmarillion
- Genre: Literary criticism
- Publisher: Wm. B. Eerdmans
- Publication date: 1983
- Media type: Print
- Pages: 167
- Followed by: A Question of Time

Splintered Light: Logos and Language in Tolkien's World is a 1983 book of literary criticism by the leading Tolkien scholar Verlyn Flieger, in which she argues that light is a central theme of Tolkien's Middle-earth mythology, in particular in The Silmarillion. It has been admired by other scholars to the extent that it has become a core element of Tolkien scholarship.

== Context ==
J. R. R. Tolkien was an English author and philologist of ancient Germanic languages, specialising in Old English; he spent much of his career as a professor at the University of Oxford. He is best known for his novels about his invented Middle-earth, The Hobbit, The Lord of the Rings, and The Silmarillion. A devout Roman Catholic, he described The Lord of the Rings as "a fundamentally religious and Catholic work", rich in Christian symbolism.

Verlyn Flieger worked for over 30 years as a Tolkien scholar, becoming accepted as one of the foremost authors in that field. Splintered Light was her first book, establishing a reputation that increased with her later monographs Interrupted Music and A Question of Time, and two edited collections of essays.

== Book ==
Verlyn Flieger argues in the book that a central symbol in The Silmarillion is light, diminishing from the first creation as it is progressively splintered. Early in the history of Arda, the world is lit by two great lamps created by Eru Iluvatar. These are destroyed, and replaced by the Two Trees of Valinor, and so on.

Splintered Light: Logos and Language in Tolkien's World was published by Wm. B. Eerdmans in 1983. A revised edition was issued in 2002. The work is not illustrated.

The book begins with a chapter on J. R. R. Tolkien as "a man of antitheses", of faith and doubt. It then compares and contrasts two of Tolkien's best-known essays, "Beowulf: The Monsters and the Critics" and "On Fairy Stories", the one essentially dark and fateful, the other bright, embracing the possibility of good fortune. The next pair of chapters examine the Inkling Owen Barfield's philosophy of mythology and Tolkien's view of fantasy as sub-creation, and then their view of language, with the idea that it was once whole, and is now fragmented.

Three chapters then examine the symbolism of light in Middle-earth as divine creation, showing with close analysis of the text of The Silmarillion that the created light is successively fragmented by interaction with the forces of darkness and the choices of the free peoples, Elves and Men. The story of The Lord of the Rings is covered in "One Fragment", in which, after the many disasters of The Silmarillion, the small remnant of the light survives to combat the remaining darkness.

A final chapter reviews the book's findings, noting two necessities, change and language, which is an agent of change.

== Reception ==
Age	Splintering of the Created Light
Years of the Lamps	Two enormous lamps, Illuin and Ormal, atop tall pillars, give light to Middle-earth, but Melkor destroys them.
Years of the Trees	The lamps are replaced by the Two Trees of Valinor, Telperion and Laurelin, lighting the blessed realm of Valinor for the Elves, leaving Middle-earth in darkness.
Years of the Trees	Fëanor crafts 3 Silmarils with light of the two Trees.
Years of the Trees	Melkor and the giant spider Ungoliant kill the Two Trees; their light survives only in the Silmarils.
Years of the Sun	There is war over the Silmarils.
Years of the Sun	One is buried in the Earth, one is lost in the Sea, one sails in the Sky as Eärendil's Star, carried in his ship Vingilot.
Third Age	Galadriel collects light of Eärendil's Star reflected in her fountain mirror.
Third Age	A little of that light is captured in the Phial of Galadriel.
Third Age	The Hobbits Frodo Baggins and Sam Gamgee use the Phial to defeat the giant spider Shelob.

In A Companion to J. R. R. Tolkien, the Tolkien scholar Bradford Lee Eden writes that Splintered Light was the first scholarly monograph on The Silmarillion. He describes it as "the most important and influential book on both language and music in Tolkien's works", discussing how music and light are interwoven as "central themes" throughout The Silmarillion, and viewing Tolkien as a "musician of words".

In the Rocky Mountain Review, the scholar and fantasy author Brian Attebery notes that Flieger shows how Tolkien followed Owen Barfield's views on myth-making, including the idea of a gradual fall from grace over the course of history. In Attebery's view, Flieger successfully links Tolkien's Middle-earth writings to his scholarship, with a "well researched and sympathetic reading of The Silmarillion, a work whose importance she goes far towards demonstrating", showing that even though it contains numerous short tales written decades apart, it is "a unified whole with a deeply felt meaning". He writes that she is "less successful in tying his creations to [Tolkien's] biography". He argues that even if the reader accepts her thesis that the paired opposites in his Middle-earth writings – between light and dark, or between redemption and fall – derive from a temperament that oscillated "between hope and despair", that would not explain why those feelings resulted in fantasy "rather than ... metaphysical verse or realistic fiction"; and it wouldn't explain, either, why The Silmarillion is overwhelmingly dark, while The Lord of the Rings is largely optimistic. Attebery suggests that the reasons might be the works' different origins – in his view, Beowulf and Norse legend versus fairy tale.

The scholar of English Janice Neuleib, reviewing the work in Christianity & Literature, writes that it both illuminates Tolkien's philosophy and analyses his "creative genius", much of it in territory unexplored by other scholars. The forces of light and dark might, she writes, have been the subject of doubt to the man, but in his writing they are "equal forces held in tension by their opposition to and dependence upon one another ... at once literal, metaphoric, and symbolic". She comments that where his celebrated essay "Beowulf: The Monsters and the Critics" showed the certainty of fated disaster, his other famous essay "On Fairy Stories" considers eucatastrophe, the happy turn of fate in a story. In her view, "the tension of these two opposing forces produced the action of The Silmarillion." However, the core of the book for Neuleib is in the 3 chapters on The Silmarillion itself, in which Flieger traces the progressive splintering of the light created by Eru Iluvatar through the music of the Valar and on down to the Elves, Men, and Hobbits who people Middle-earth. The Elves too are sundered into peoples with differing languages as they agree to approach the light of the Two Lamps or the Two Trees, or reject this. Their languages, too, represent the light, and the original and higher language, Quenya, is spoken only by the Elves who have seen the light of Valinor. The most prized artefacts of the Elves, the Silmarils, capture a little of the splintered light; their maker, Fëanor, is therefore for both Flieger and Tolkien the most significant of the Elves; and he is destroyed by his creation.

The scholar of theology and literature Ralph C. Wood, reviewing another of Flieger's books for VII, writes that Splintered Light is "an indispensable work for any serious study of the great fantasist, especially of The Silmarillion".

Flieger was nominated for the 1986 Mythopoeic Scholarship Award for Splintered Light. The scholar of humanities Deidre Dawson comments that the book has become a core element of Tolkien scholarship.

== Bibliography ==
- Flieger, Verlyn (1983). Splintered Light: Logos and Language in Tolkien's World. Wm B. Eerdmans Publishing. ISBN 978-0-8028-1955-0.
