= Time in Tolkien's fiction =

Literary theme

The philologist and author J. R. R. Tolkien set out to explore time travel and distortions in the passage of time in his fiction in a variety of ways. The passage of time in The Lord of the Rings is uneven, seeming to run at differing speeds in the realms of Men and of Elves. In this, Tolkien was following medieval tradition in which time proceeds differently in Elfland. The whole work, too, following the theory he spelt out in his essay "On Fairy-Stories", is meant to transport the reader into another time. He built a process of decline and fall in Middle-earth into the story, echoing the sense of impending destruction of Norse mythology. The Elves attempt to delay this decline as far as possible in their realms of Rivendell and Lothlórien, using their Rings of Power to slow the passage of time. Elvish time, in The Lord of the Rings as in the medieval Thomas the Rhymer and the Danish Elvehøj (Elf Hill), presents apparent contradictions. Both the story itself and scholarly interpretations offer varying attempts to resolve these; time may be flowing faster or more slowly, or perceptions may differ.

Tolkien was writing in a period when notions of time and space were being radically revised, from the science fiction time travel of H. G. Wells, to the inner world of dreams and the unconscious mind explored by Sigmund Freud, and the transformation of physics with the counter-intuitive notions of quantum mechanics and general relativity proposed by Max Planck and Albert Einstein. In 1927 J. W. Dunne wrote an influential book proposing a theory that time could flow differently for different observers, and that dreams gave access to all of time. A network of writers who were influenced by Wells, including Henry James, Dunne, and George du Maurier created a literary environment that enabled Tolkien to explore time travel in his own way, first in the unfinished The Lost Road, then in the unfinished The Notion Club Papers, and finally in The Lord of the Rings.

Tolkien mentions both the mortal desire to escape from death, and the Elvish desire to escape from immortality. The Tolkien scholar Verlyn Flieger suggests that these illustrate a Christian message, that one must not attempt to cling to anything as worldly things will change and decay; instead, one must let go, trust in the unknown future, and in God. This theme is, she argues, demonstrated in the protagonist Frodo Baggins, who is saved by having the courage to face loss, to move, and to change.

== Context ==
=== Turning away from present time ===
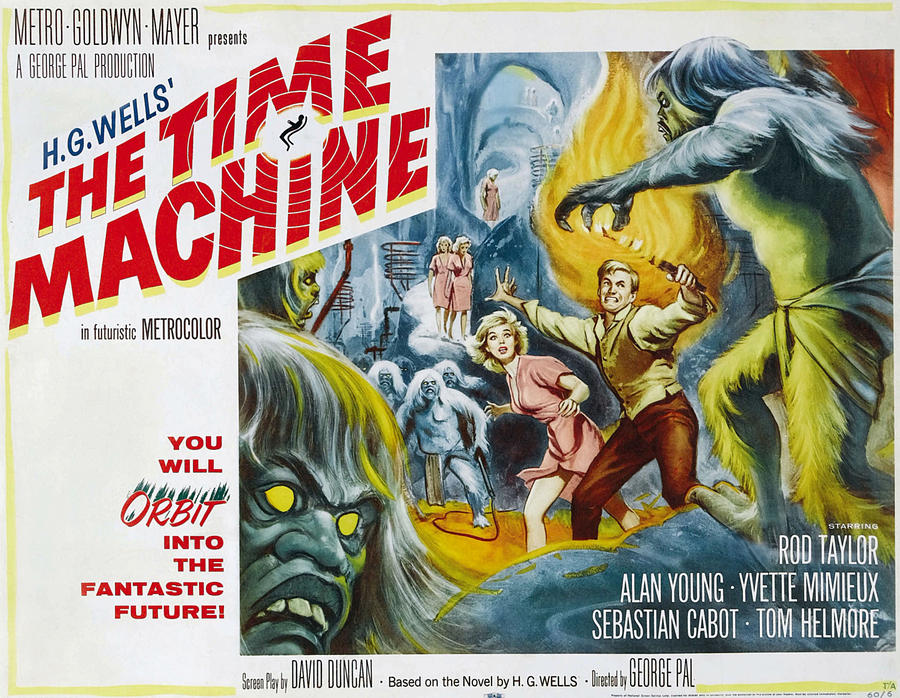
H. G. Wells's novella The Time Machine was an early influence on a network of authors who together helped to provide J. R. R. Tolkien with a conception of time travel. Poster for a film adaptation

The Tolkien scholar Verlyn Flieger wrote that at the end of the nineteenth century, thinkers in several fields were turning away from present time and exploring other ways to view the world. In 1895 H. G. Wells wrote The Time Machine, a science fiction novella in which a machine allows an observer to travel forwards and backwards in time. In 1900, Sigmund Freud published his The Interpretation of Dreams, exploring the inner world of the unconscious mind. That same year, Max Planck postulated that energy is quantized, paving the way for the counter-intuitive theory of quantum mechanics. In 1905, Albert Einstein formulated his special theory of relativity, relating space and time in a new way in physics. The cultural historian Modris Eksteins remarked that "rational man [had] undermined his own world". Flieger wrote that fantasy writers like J. R. R. Tolkien, David Lindsay, E. R. Eddison, and Mervyn Peake were both turning away from modernism and using modern theories to seek to escape, "at once reactionary and avant-garde".

=== Time in different dimensions ===
In 1927, the soldier and pioneer aviator turned philosopher J. W. Dunne published his book An Experiment with Time, in which he presented a multi-dimensional theory of time, suggesting that dreams could combine memories of both past and future events, and that time could flow differently for observers in different dimensions. Further, he believed that dreams could give access to all dimensions of time, a mechanism for time travel. The theory did not gain scientific acceptance, not least because it led to an infinite regress of dimensions, but attracted the interest of contemporary writers including H. G. Wells, J. B. Priestley, Jorge Luis Borges, John Buchan, James Hilton, Graham Greene, Rumer Godden, and two members of the Inklings literary group, C. S. Lewis and Tolkien.

=== Space or time ===
Navigable diagram of Tolkien's legendarium. The two unfinished time travel novels served as a source of ideas for The Lord of the Rings.

Tolkien recorded in his letters that Lewis proposed to him that since there was too little of what either man liked in literature, they would have to write stories themselves. He further wrote that they tossed a coin for the choice of subject: Lewis got space travel, and Tolkien got time travel. (Note: Carpenter 2023, Letters #257 to Christopher Bretherton, 16 July 1964, and #294 to Charlotte and Denis Plimmer, 8 February 1967) Lewis published the first of his three "space romances", Out of the Silent Planet, in 1938. Tolkien began The Lost Road, abandoning the draft after four chapters in 1937; he tried the theme again in The Notion Club Papers, written between 1944 and 1946, which he also dropped; and finally made use of some of these ideas in The Lord of the Rings, published in 1954–1955.

The Inklings scholar John D. Rateliff describes Tolkien's two time travel novels and Lewis's The Dark Tower, all incomplete, as a "triad". Lewis's work, written sometime between 1939 and 1946, and published posthumously in 1977, is a possible sequel to Out of the Silent Planet; its protagonists use a "chronoscope" to view an alien world in "Othertime".

== Development of ideas ==
=== Desire "to go back" in time ===
Christopher Tolkien, reviewing the motivations for his father's writings, commented that

He felt that he could say that his most permanent mood … had been since childhood the desire to go back. To walk in Time, perhaps, as men walk on long roads; or to survey it, as men may see the world from a mountain, or the earth as a living map beneath an airship. But in any case to see with eyes and to hear with ears: to see the lie of old and even forgotten lands, to behold ancient men walking, and hear their languages as they spoke them, in the days before the days.

— Christopher Tolkien, The Lost Road and Other Writings, 1987, page 45

Devin Brown, writing in Mythlore, argues that storytelling itself is "the ultimate time travel machine", noting that Tolkien's 1939 essay "On Fairy-Stories" stated that a defining characteristic of a fairy story is "its ability to transport the reader outside of time to realms otherwise inaccessible".

=== Successive attempts at a time-travel novel ===
The Lord of the Rings was preceded in Tolkien's writings by two unfinished time-travel novels, The Lost Road, begun in 1936–37, and The Notion Club Papers, begun c. 1945. Both texts make use of variants of the character Ælfwine to provide a frame story for the time travel, and indeed for his legendarium. The Old English name Ælfwine means "Elf-friend", as does the later Quenya name Elendil, and the Old High German and Lombard equivalents, Alwin and Alboin, respectively; all these names (boldface in the table) appear in the texts as incarnations of the protagonist in the different times visited.

Time-travelling frame story characters with the periods they visit
| Period | Second Age Over 9,000 years ago | Lombards (568–774) | Anglo-Saxons (c. 450–1066) | England 20th century | |
| Language of names | Quenya (in Númenor) | Germanic | Old English | Modern English | Meaning of names |
|---|---|---|---|---|---|
| Character 1 | **Elendil** | **Alboin** | **Ælfwine** | **Alwin** | Elf-friend |
| Character 2 | Herendil | Audoin | Eadwine | Edwin | Bliss-friend |
| Character 3 | Valandil ("Valar-friend") | ——— | Oswine | Oswin, cf. Oswald | God-friend |

The different time-travel novels indicate the development of Tolkien's ideas and his skill in expressing them.

Tolkien's successive attempts at a time-travel novel
| Work | Written | Publication | Time-travel mechanism | Destinations |
|---|---|---|---|---|
| The Lost Road | 1936 unfinished | Edited by Christopher Tolkien in The Lost Road and Other Writings, 1987 (Note: Tolkien 1987, Part 1, ch. 3 "The Lost Road") | Time travel by Dunne-style "vision", from modern England | The Saxon England of Alfred the Great, the Lombard king Alboin of St Benedict's time, the Baltic Sea in the Viking Age, Ireland at the time of the Tuatha Dé Danann (600 years after Noah's Flood), the prehistoric North in the Ice Age, Middle-earth in the Third Age, the Fall of Gil-galad, and the Downfall of Númenor in the Second Age of Tolkien's legendarium, when the world is reshaped as round, and the Straight Road to the Earthly Paradise of Valinor can no longer be sailed by Men |
| The Notion Club Papers | c. 1945 unfinished | Edited by Christopher Tolkien in Sauron Defeated, 1992 (Note: Tolkien 1992, Part 2, "The Notion Club Papers") | A frame story with future as well as past time travel leads to a retelling of The Lost Road, again using dream as the mechanism | The Atlantis-like island of Númenor in Tolkien's legendarium |
| The Lord of the Rings | In stages, haltingly, between 1937 and 1949 | 1954–1955 | The travellers feel taken back in time on entering the Elvish land. Time seems to pass differently there, though the protagonists hold varied opinions as to how that is. They are allowed to look into a magic fountain, the Mirror of Galadriel, to see visions of the past, the present, and a possible future. Elvish leaders in Middle-earth, including Galadriel, use the power of their Rings to hold back time and change. | Lothlórien, the Elvish realm of Galadriel |

Flieger comments that had either The Lost Road or The Notion Club Papers been finished,

we would have had a dream of time-travel through actual history and recorded myth which would have functioned as both introduction and epilogue to Tolkien's own invented mythology. The result would have been time-travel not on the scale of ordinary science fiction but of epic, a dream of myth and history and fiction interlocking as Tolkien wanted them to, as they might well once have done.

=== A better time in the distant past ===
Tolkien built a process of decline and fall in Middle-earth, implying that if one could go back in time, one would find a far more perfect world than the present one, into both The Silmarillion and The Lord of the Rings. The pattern is expressed in several ways, including the splintering of the light provided by the Creator, into progressively smaller parts; the fragmentation of languages and peoples, especially the Elves, who are split into many groups; the successive falls, starting with that of the angelic spirit Melkor, and followed by the destruction of the Two Lamps of Middle-earth and then of the Two Trees of Valinor, and the cataclysmic fall of Númenor. (Note: Carpenter 2023, Letter #131 to Milton Waldman, late 1951) The whole of The Lord of the Rings shares the sense of impending destruction of Norse mythology, where even the gods will perish. The Dark Lord Sauron may be defeated, but that will entail the fading and departure of the Elves, leaving the world to Men, to industrialise and to pollute, however much Tolkien regretted the fact.

=== Time held back in The Lord of the Rings ===
Over a bridge of time

As soon as he set foot upon the far bank of Silverlode a strange feeling had come upon him, and it deepened as he walked on into the Naith: it seemed to him that he had stepped over a bridge of time into a corner of the Elder Days, and was now walking in a world that was no more. In Rivendell there was memory of ancient things; in Lórien the ancient things still lived on in the waking world. Evil had been seen and heard there, sorrow had been known; the Elves feared and distrusted the world outside: wolves were howling on the wood's borders: but on the land of Lórien no shadow lay.
— The Fellowship of the Ring, book 2, ch. 6, "Lothlórien"

The Elvish realms described in The Lord of the Rings, Rivendell and Lothlórien, were the remnants of far larger kingdoms in Beleriand in the First Age. The Elves were aware of the inexorable process of decline and fall in Middle-earth, marked by the splintering of the original created light and by the sundering of the Elves. The Elves sought to delay this decline as far as possible. The ruler of Rivendell, Elrond, was the bearer of the Ring Vilya, providing him with the power to protect Rivendell and slow the passage of time in its hidden valley: indeed, Rivendell kept its own calendar. (Note: Tolkien (1955), Appendix D, "The Calendars") (Note: Tolkien (1980), part 2, "The Second Age" ch. 4 "The History of Galadriel and Celeborn", "Concerning Galadriel and Celeborn") (Note: Tolkien (1954a), book 2, ch. 1 "Many Meetings") The ruler of Lothlórien, Galadriel, was similarly the bearer of the ring Nenya, which she used to protect her realm and to keep it in an apparently timeless and "unstained" state. (Note: Tolkien 1980, Part 2, ch. 4 "The History of Galadriel and Celeborn") (Note: Tolkien 1955, Appendix B, "The Tale of Years (Chronology of the Westlands)")

The eight companions of The Fellowship of the Ring, escaping from the dark tunnels of Moria on their quest to destroy the One Ring, feel taken back in time on entering the Elvish land of Lothlórien. They notice, too, that time seems to pass differently there, and that the land appears to be unstained by the ravages of time. They are allowed to look into a magic fountain, the Mirror of Galadriel, to see visions of the past, the present, and a possible future. Galadriel uses the power of her Ring to hold back time and change. She perceives that the coming of the One Ring will be fateful for her realm, as either it will be destroyed, her Ring will lose its power, and time will sweep the Elves away; or the Dark Lord Sauron will regain his Ring, and take control of all the others. (Note: Tolkien (1954a), book 2, ch. 6 "Lothlórien"; ch. 7 "The Mirror of Galadriel"; ch. 8 "Farewell to Lórien")

== Influences ==
=== Paired time-travellers with Old English names ===
E. Nesbit's 1908 The House of Arden had a pair of characters, Edred and Elfrida, with Old English names much like Tolkien's Eadwine and Aelfwine, who similarly travel back in time.

Virginia Luling, writing in Mallorn, identifies E. Nesbit as the source of the device of a pair of characters who travel back in time from Edwardian England. Nesbit uses a brother and a sister named Edred and Elfrida, guided by a magical character, Mouldiwarp; they always meet a similar pair of characters in each of the earlier centuries that they visit. This is the central plot device in her 1908 The House of Arden; Luling comments that this seems to be the only work before Tolkien's The Lost Road that functions in this way. The Lost Road has father/son pairs named Edwin/Elwin, Eadwine/Aelfwine, Audoin/Alboin, Amandil/Elendil (all meaning "Bliss-friend/Elf-friend"). Nesbit's Edred and Elfrida, too, have "intriguing[ly]" similar Old English names to Tolkien's paired characters; Edred is "Bliss-counsel", while Elfrida is "Elf-strength", though Luling doubts that Nesbit knew these meanings or gave them any significance.

=== Time travel in science fiction and speculative physics ===
Flieger identifies a network of influences, starting from H. G. Wells and including Dunne; collectively, they provided what she calls "a template" for Tolkien's ideas of time travel.

Time-travelling influences on Tolkien identified by Verlyn Flieger
| Author | Work | Date | Time-travel mechanism |
|---|---|---|---|
| H. G. Wells | The Time Machine | 1895 | Machine able to carry an observer forwards or backwards in time |
| Henry James | The Sense of the Past | 1900 | An 18th century house gives the feeling of going back in time; a painting of an ancestor who shares the protagonist's name comes alive, and the men meet |
| Charlotte Moberly; Eleanor Jourdain | An Adventure | 1911 | Lost in the gardens of Versailles, two ladies see [the ghost of] Marie Antoinette, presumably while she was under house arrest, c. 1790; they feel her sadness as she recalls happier times before the French Revolution |
| George du Maurier (friend of James's) | Peter Ibbetson | 1891 novel 1917 play | Boy and girl separated as children share dreamed experiences, their dreams becoming their primary existence; they travel back to their ancestors, the French Revolution, the Renaissance, to Charlemagne's time, to the Ice Age |
| J. W. Dunne | An Experiment with Time | 1927 | Theory of multiple time dimensions for different observers |
| John L. Balderston | Berkeley Square | 1926 | Updated version of James's The Sense of the Past; it cites Einstein's relativity and seems to allude to J. W. Dunne's dimensions of time |

The physicist Kristine Larsen, writing in Mallorn, endorses Flieger's view, saying that Tolkien "undoubtedly took Dunne's dream mechanism as the starting point for both of his abandoned time-travel projects, The Lost Road and The Notion Club Papers", and notes that his friend Lewis's The Dark Tower explicitly references both Dunne and An Adventure. She observes further that both men owned copies of An Experiment with Time, and that Tolkien had annotated his copy, showing that he understood Dunne's theory but did not agree with all of it.

The Tolkien scholar Rhona Beare notes in Mythlore that Tolkien liked Wells's journey to the far future, where there are two subspecies of humans. Tolkien admired the visit to these peoples who "live far away, in an abyss of time so deep as to work an enchantment upon them", but found Wells's time machine "preposterous and incredible", being a cross between a car and a bicycle; he chose to use different mechanisms in his stories. Beare notes that in The Lost Road, the character Alboin longs "to go back: to walk in Time, perhaps, as men walk on long roads; or to survey it, as men may see the world from a mountain". Further, Alboin says "I wish there was a Time-machine. But Time is not to be conquered by machine. And I should go back, not forward; and I think backwards would be more possible."

== Analysis ==
=== A timeless England ===
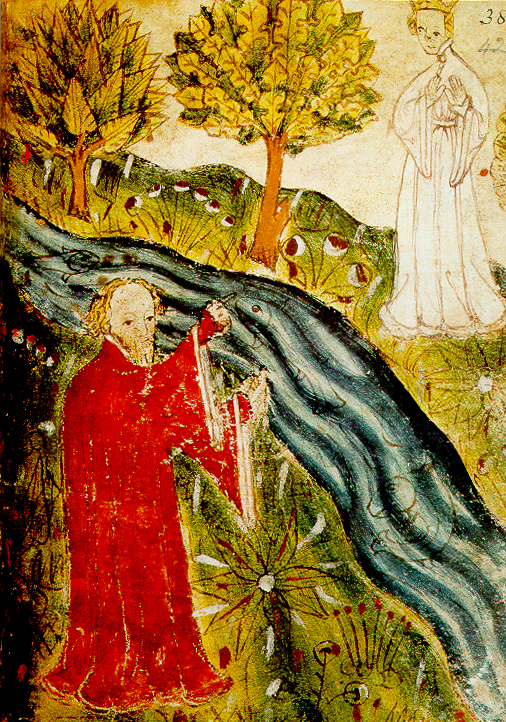
Earthly Paradise: Lothlórien has been compared to the place dreamed of in the Middle English poem Pearl. The miniature from the Cotton Nero manuscript shows the Dreamer on the other side of the stream from the Pearl-maiden.

The Tolkien scholar Tom Shippey writes that what the Hobbit Sam calls the "magic" of Lothlórien, which everyone in the Fellowship can see and feel, echoes the feeling in the Middle English poem Pearl. That poem has an exceptionally complex metrical structure, and narrates in a "veiled and riddling" way how a father bereaved of his daughter falls asleep and finds himself in a land without grief; he sees her standing on the far side of a river that he cannot cross. Evidently that river is death, and she is in the heavenly Paradise, while he is in an intermediate land, not Earth but an Earthly Paradise, a "nameless land, with its brilliant trees and shining gravel". Lothlórien, too, is a locus amoenus, an idyllic land with "no stain". To get there, the Fellowship first wash off the stains of ordinary life by wading the River Nimrodel.

But then the Fellowship have to cross a rope-bridge over a second river, the Silverlode, which they must not drink from, and which the evil Gollum cannot cross. Shippey comments that "a determined allegorist" might call the first river "baptism", and the second one "death"; and that the land between the rivers might be old England, the "'mountains green' of 'ancient time'" in William Blake's Jerusalem. He notes that when the Fellowship come to the deepest part of Lothlórien, in the angle between the Silverlode and the Anduin, the Elf Haldir welcomes them, calling the area the Naith or "Gore", both unfamiliar words for the land between two converging rivers, and then giving a third word with a special resonance: the "Angle". The name "England" comes from the Angle between the Flensburg Fjord and the River Schlei, in the north of Germany next to Denmark, the origin of the Angles among the Anglo-Saxons who founded England. Further, the land between two other rivers (to the west of the Misty Mountains), the Hoarwell or Mitheithel, and the Loudwater or Bruinen, was where the three tribes of Hobbits who colonised the Shire had come from, just as the three tribes who colonised England had come from the Angle area of Germany and Denmark. If that was Tolkien's meaning, Shippey writes, Frodo's feeling that he has "stepped over a bridge of time into a corner of the Elder Days, and was now walking in a world that was no more" might be exactly correct.

Tom Shippey's analysis of Tolkien's river angles
| Rivers | Place | Peoples | Time |
|---|---|---|---|
| Flensburg Fjord, Schlei | Germany | The Angles, Saxons, and Jutes, forefathers of the English | Long ago, before England was founded |
| Hoarwell, Loudwater | Eriador | The forefathers of the Hobbits | Long ago, before the Shire was founded |
| Nimrodel, Silverlode, Anduin | Lothlórien | The Elves, as they used to be | Long ago, in "the Elder Days ... in a world that was no more" |

=== Elfland where time is different ===
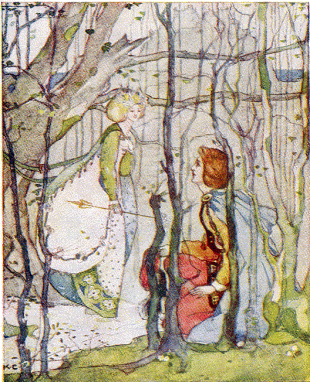
Time in Lothlórien was distorted, as it was in Elfland for Thomas the Rhymer. Illustration by Katherine Cameron, 1908

Shippey states that in Lothlórien, Tolkien reconciles otherwise conflicting ideas regarding time-distortion in Elfland from European folklore, such as is exemplified in the medieval Thomas the Rhymer, who was carried off by the Queen of Elfland, and the Danish ballad Elvehøj (Elf Hill).

The Tolkien scholar Verlyn Flieger writes that the Fellowship debated how much time had passed while they were there, Sam Gamgee recalling that the moon was waning just before they arrived, and was new when they left, though they all felt they had only been there for a few days. She notes that Sam actually exclaims "Anyone would think that time did not count in there!", while Frodo sees Galadriel as "present and yet remote, a living vision of that which has already been left far behind by the flowing streams of Time" and Legolas, an Elf who ought to know how things work in Elven lands, says that time does not stop there, "but change and growth is not in all things and places alike. For Elves the world moves, and it moves both very swift and very slow. Swift, because they themselves change little, and all else fleets by. Slow, because they do not count the running years".

Shippey considers Legolas's explanation to resolve the apparent contradiction between the mortal and Elvish points of view about Elvish time. Flieger however writes that there is a definite contradiction between Frodo's position, that there is an actual difference in time between Lothlórien and everywhere else, and Legolas's, that it is a matter of perception. She considers Aragorn's view to reconcile these two positions, agreeing that time has passed as Legolas said, but that the Fellowship felt time as the Elves did while they were in Lothlórien. That is not, writes Flieger, the end of the matter, as she feels that Aragorn reintroduces the dilemma when he says that the moon carried on changing "in the world outside": this suggests once again that Lothlórien had its own laws of nature, as in a fairy tale.

Verlyn Flieger's analysis of the paradoxes of Elvish time in Lothlórien
| Source | Story | Time |
|---|---|---|
| Thomas the Rhymer | Mortal enters Elfland. Spends a few nights there. Returns to find all friends dead, dim memory of a man lost visiting Elfland. | flows much more slowly in Elfland. |
| Elvehøj (Elf Hill) | Elf-maiden sings: "the swift stream then stood still" | flows much faster in Elfland; everything outside stops. |
| Frodo's view | Lothlórien "in a time that has elsewhere long gone by". | different epoch, long ago. |
| Legolas's view | Both fast and slow: Elves change little, "all else fleets by". | different perception of time's speed. |
| Aragorn's 1st view | Mortals feel time as Elves do while in Lothlórien. | different perception of time's speed. |
| Aragorn's 2nd view | But Moon went on changing "in the world outside". | different actual flow of time (as Thomas the Rhymer) |

=== Timelessness and altered time ===
Flieger writes that while time is treated both naturally and supernaturally throughout The Lord of the Rings, his "most mystical and philosophical deployment of time" concerns Elves. It is therefore "no accident", she writes, that Frodo has multiple experiences of altered time in Lothlórien, from feeling he has crossed "a bridge of Time" on entering that land, to seeing Aragorn on the hill of Cerin Amroth as he was as a young man, dressed in white. Flieger notes that in On Fairy-stories, which she calls "the clearest statement of his artistic credo", Tolkien writes of what it is about fairy tales that brought him enchantment. It was what he named Faërie, at once "a spell cast and the altered and enchanted state the spell produced". That was, she explains, not much to do with fairies themselves; magic was an element, but standing outside our usual time was important. She cites Tolkien again, as he wrote that fairy-stories "open a door on Other Time, and if we pass through, though only for a moment, we stand outside our own time, outside Time itself, maybe". (Note: Tolkien 1983, "On Fairy-stories", p. 129)

The scholar Chris Brawley writes that Tolkien was attempting to give readers a glimpse of the numinous. He cites Rudolf Otto's 1919 The Idea of the Holy, which argues that while the numinous, "the common core of all religious experiences", cannot be sharply defined, it can be felt through things such as art and literature: "a deep joy may fill our minds without any clear realization upon our part of its source and the object to which it refers". Otto indeed states that fairy-stories are early manifestations of the numinous. The result, writes Brawley, is that the reader of The Lord of the Rings gets a religious feeling, evoked implicitly, since no structured theology is presented. Tolkien's account of Lothlórien, he adds, powerfully conveys the mythic quality of timelessness, most apparent when the Fellowship leaves and finds that a month has gone by, but they cannot account for the days that passed. This timelessness, however, is not permanent; it will be subject to the inexorable process of decline and fall in Middle-earth when the protection of Galadriel's ring is withdrawn. Galadriel lets Frodo look into her prophetic mirror, and tells him that if his quest to destroy the Ring should fail, and Sauron regains the Ring, "then we are laid bare to the Enemy. Yet if you succeed, then our power is diminished, and Lothlórien will fade, and the tides of time will sweep it away". (Note: Tolkien (1954a), book 2, ch. 7 "The Mirror of Galadriel")

=== Visiting the past ===
The scholar of literature David M. Miller comments that in the narrative, "time spurts and lags with discernible rhythm. Rivendell and Lothlórien are timeouts in both movement and calendar." These, he writes, at least fit into the flow of the narrative: on a journey, there are moments of activity and moments of rest. Unlike them is the "genuine digression" with Tom Bombadil, which does not move the story at all. Miller suggests that one hint to the purpose of the Bombadil episode is in the names: the "Old Forest, Old Man Willow, Tom as Eldest" (his emphasis) all stand outside time, "left over from the First Age". He writes that at the point where the Hobbits venture into the Old Forest, "it is as though they had broken through a crust in time." Miller likens this to a team of archaeologists digging patiently through stratified deposits, back through time: "they dip into the First age of Middle-earth. There they discover a remnant of that first age when trees ruled." Tom and Goldberry are in his opinion "anachronisms, left over from the first age." They matter to the story as part of a journey through time, not space: in Miller's words, "Their structural importance is temporal, not geographical." Thus, "The Old Forest is not merely left over from the first age; it is the first age." Evil, too, can affect both the present and the past; if Sauron conquers, the light will not only be put out across the whole of Middle-earth: Sauron could "eliminate even [its] past existence".

Miller sees Frodo's encounter with the Barrow-wight similarly, as another "exercise in temporal archaeology." Here, the time visited is the Third Age, c. 1300, (Note: Tolkien 1955, Appendix B, "The Third Age", entry for year c. 1300, contrary to Miller's "Second Age".) at the moment when the Witch-King of Angmar (the leader of the Nazgûl) attacks from his fortress of Carn Dûm and defeats the people who lived around what became the Barrow-downs. Frodo "moves through a doorway in time" when he steps past the ancient standing stone, and cries out "The men of Carn Dûm came on us at night, and we were worsted. Ah! The spear in my heart!"

Miller analyses the pattern of movements and communication through time as follows:

Communication through Time between different Ages of Middle-earth
| Action | Actor is in | Recipient is in |
|---|---|---|
| Frodo calls Tom Bombadil for help against the Barrow-wight | Third Age | First Age |
| Frodo calls Elbereth for help against Shelob | Third Age | Second Age |

Replayings of past events / Anticipations of future events
| Action | Past event | Future event |
|---|---|---|
| Frodo calls Tom Bombadil for help | ——— | Frodo calls Elbereth for help |
| Frodo cuts off the Barrow-wight's hand | Isildur cuts off Sauron's finger, bearing the Ring | Merry strikes the Nazgûl with his magical sword from the Barrow-wight's hoard |
| Frodo and Gollum drop the Ring into Mount Doom, destroying Barad-Dûr, and causing "the windy dissolution of Sauron" | Bombadil scatters the treasure, destroys the barrow, banishes the Barrow-wight | Wormtongue kills Saruman, whose body disappears and whose spirit is blown away in the wind |

=== Escape from time ===
In her book A Question of Time, Flieger quotes Tolkien's comment that "The human-stories of the elves are doubtless full of the Escape from Deathlessness". (Note: Tolkien 1983, "On Fairy-stories", p. 153) In her view, this explains the exploration of time in his mythology, death and deathlessness being the "concomitants" of time and timelessness. Tolkien wrote in a 1956 letter that:

The real theme [of The Lord of the Rings] for me is ... Death and Immortality: the mystery of the love of the world in the hearts of a race [Men] 'doomed' to leave and seemingly lose it; the anguish in the hearts of a race [Elves] 'doomed' not to leave it, until its whole evil-aroused story is complete. But if you have now read Vol. III and the story of Aragorn [and Arwen], you will have perceived that. (Note: Carpenter 2023, letter #186 to Joanna de Bortadano, April 1956) (Note: Tolkien 2008, p. 119)

A land of light

Frodo looked and saw, still at some distance, a hill of many mighty trees, or a city of green towers: which it was he could not tell. Out of it, it seemed to him that the power and light came that held all the land in sway. He longed suddenly to fly like a bird to rest in the green city. Then he looked eastward and saw all the land of Lórien running down to the pale gleam of Anduin, the Great River. He lifted his eyes across the river and all the light went out, and he was back again in the world he knew.
— The Fellowship of the Ring, book 2, ch. 6, "Lothlórien"

Flieger argues that timelessness cannot really be pictured, for if it was, the story would be frozen in midstep, the narrative stopped dead. The nearest Tolkien can get is to depict the Elves living in Lothlórien: they neither grow old nor die; their strength and beauty do not fade. In this state of preservation, she writes, they illustrate a Christian message: "the danger to faith in a fallen world of clinging to the present, which inevitably becomes living in the past". She contrasts this, a mistaken attempted escape from change and death, with the actions of mortal Men and Hobbits who boldly face the loss of all they hold dear, "the absolute necessity of letting go, of trusting in the unknown future, of having faith in God". Frodo is enchanted by his vision of Lothlórien as a place of perfect beauty which he must soon leave, just as he is horrified, she writes, by his matching vision of the Shire, shattered, despoiled, industrialised, polluted, to which he will return. When he does return home after completing his quest, he meets the fallen wizard Saruman. Frodo has grown very much, the wizard says bitterly. Flieger explains that Frodo has outgrown his little world of the Shire; he is obliged to move, but also able to change. This causes him pain, but is his salvation.
