= Lothlórien =

Realm of the Elves in Tolkien's legendarium

- J. R. R. Tolkien's legendarium location
- "The Forest of Lothlórien in Spring" by J.R.R. Tolkien, c. 1940, when he was writing about Lothlórien. The Fellowship however visited Lothlórien in winter.

In-universe information
- Other names: Lórien; Lórinand; Laurelindórenan the Golden Wood the Hidden Land; Dwimordene
- Type: realm of the Elves
- Ruled by: Amdír, Amroth (Second Age), Celeborn and Galadriel (Second and Third Ages)
- Locations: Caras Galadhon, Cerin Amroth, Naith or Angle, the river Nimrodel, the river Silverlode
- Geography: western Wilderland
- Lifespan: Founded in Second Age; (Note: Tolkien 1980, Part 2, ch. 4 "History of Galadriel and Celeborn") abandoned in Fourth Age. (Note: Tolkien 1955, Appendix A.I.v, "The Tale of Aragorn and Arwen")
- Capital: Caras Galadhon

In J. R. R. Tolkien's legendarium, Lothlórien or Lórien is the fairest realm of the Elves remaining in Middle-earth during the Third Age. It is ruled by Galadriel and Celeborn from their city of tree houses at Caras Galadhon. The wood-elves of the realm are called Galadhrim.

The realm, a broad woodland between the Misty Mountains and the River Anduin, is the Elven centre of resistance against the Dark Lord Sauron in The Lord of the Rings. Galadriel had one of the Three Elf-Rings, and used it to keep Sauron from seeing into Lothlórien. The Company of the Ring spent some time in Lothlórien after passing through Moria. Galadriel prepared them for their quest with individual gifts.

Scholars have noted that Lothlórien represents variously an Earthly Paradise; an Elfland where time is different, reflecting the traditions of European folklore; and a land of light striving biblically with the darkness of evil.

== Fictional description ==
=== Names ===
Tolkien gave the forest many different names, reflecting its fictional history and the way it is perceived by the different peoples of Middle-earth.

Name	Meaning	Origin
Lindórinand	Valley of the Land of the Singers	Older Nandorin name of the area
Lórinand	Valley of Gold	Nandorin name after introduction of mallorn trees (Note: The form Lórinand was rendered in Quenya as Laurenandë and in Sindarin as Glornan or Nan Laur, all of the same meaning.)
Laurelindórenan	Valley of Singing Gold	Sindarin name after the introduction of mallorn trees
Lothlórien	The Dreamflower	Sindarin name in the Third Age
Lórien	Dream Land	Shortened form of Lothlórien matching the name of the Gardens of Lórien in Aman
Dwimordene	Valley of illusions	Used in Rohan, (Note: Tolkien 1954, Book 3, ch. 6 "The King of the Golden Hall") from Old English dwimor "illusion", denu, "valley"
The Golden Wood	—	The Common Speech (Note: Tolkien 1954, Book 3, ch. 2 "The Riders of Rohan")

=== History ===
Early in the First Age, some of the Eldar left the Great March to Valinor and settled in the lands east of the Misty Mountains. These elves became known as the Nandor, and later as the Silvan Elves. Galadriel made contact with an existing Nandorin realm, Lindórinand, in what became Lothlórien, and planted there the golden mallorn trees which Gil-galad had received as a gift from Tar-Aldarion. (Note: Tolkien 1980, Part 2, ch. 1 "A Description of Númenor")

The culture and knowledge of the Silvan elves was enriched by the arrival of Sindarin Elves from west of the Misty Mountains, and the Silvan language was gradually replaced by Sindarin. Amongst these arrivals was Amdír, who became their first lord, as well as Galadriel and Celeborn, who fled the destruction of Eregion during the War of the Elves and Sauron. In the Third Age, Amroth, the former Lord of Lothlórien, went to the south of Middle-earth with his beloved Nimrodel, but drowned in the Bay of Belfalas after she went missing in the Ered Nimrais and never returned. Control of Lothlórien passed to Galadriel and Celeborn. Galadriel's Ring of Power preserved the land from death and decay, and warded off Sauron's gaze. (Note: Tolkien 1980, Part 2, ch. 4 "The History of Galadriel and Celeborn") (Note: Tolkien 1955, Appendix B, "The Tale of Years (Chronology of the Westlands)")

As the War of the Ring loomed, the Company of the Ring, emerging from the dark tunnels of Moria and seeing their leader Gandalf perish, was brought through Lothlórien to Caras Galadhon, and there met the Lord and Lady of the Galadhrim. The Fellowship spent roughly a month in Lothlórien, though it seemed to them only a few days. Before they left, Galadriel allowed Samwise and Frodo to look in the Mirror of Galadriel, giving them a glimpse of events in the future or at other times; she also tested the loyalty of Fellowship members, and gave each of them a gift for their quest. (Note: Tolkien 1954a, Book 2, ch. 6 "Lothlórien", and ch. 7 "The Mirror of Galadriel")

After the fall of Sauron, Galadriel and Celeborn rid Dol Guldur of Sauron's influence. (Note: Tolkien 1955, Appendix B, "The Great Years") Galadriel left for Valinor at the beginning of the Fourth Age, and Celeborn later followed her. The city slowly became depopulated and Lothlórien faded. By the time of the death of Queen Arwen, Celeborn and Galadriel's granddaughter, Lothlórien itself was deserted. (Note: Tolkien 1955, Appendix A 1.v, "The Tale of Aragorn and Arwen")

=== Geography ===
Lothlórien lay in the west of Wilderland. To its west stood the Misty Mountains, with the Dwarf-realm of Moria, and on its east ran the great river Anduin. Across the Anduin lay the forest of Mirkwood and the fortress of Dol Guldur, which could be glimpsed from high points in Lothlórien. The river Silverlode or Celebrant flowed through Lothlórien and joined the Anduin; it had a tributary from the west, the river Nimrodel. The realm lay primarily to the north of the Silverlode, with a small strip of forested land to the south. The main part of the realm was the triangular region between the converging rivers Silverlode and Anduin, called the Naith (Sindarin for "spearhead") (Note: Tolkien 1987, Etymologies, SNAS) by the Elves or the Gore or Angle in the Common Speech. The tip of the Naith was called the Egladil (Sindarin for "elven-point").

Caras Galadhon (from galadh ("tree")) was the city of Lothlórien and the main settlement of the Galadhrim in Middle-earth. (Note: Tolkien 1954a, Book 2, ch. 8 "Farewell to Lórien") Founded by Amroth in the Third Age, deep in the forest, the city's dwellings were atop tall mallorn trees; the mallorn had been brought to that land by Galadriel. The city was "some ten miles" from the point where the rivers Silverlode (Sindarin: Celebrant) and Anduin met, close to the eastern border of the realm. In the trees there were many tree-platforms, which could be elaborate dwellings or simple guard-posts. (Note: Talan in Sindarin, flet in Westron.) Stairways of ladders were built around the main trees, and at night the city was lit by "many lamps" – "green and gold and silver". (Note: Tolkien 1954a, Book 2, ch. 6 "Lothlórien") The city's entrance was on the southern side. (Note: Tolkien 1954a, Book 2, ch. 7 "The Mirror of Galadriel")

== Analysis ==
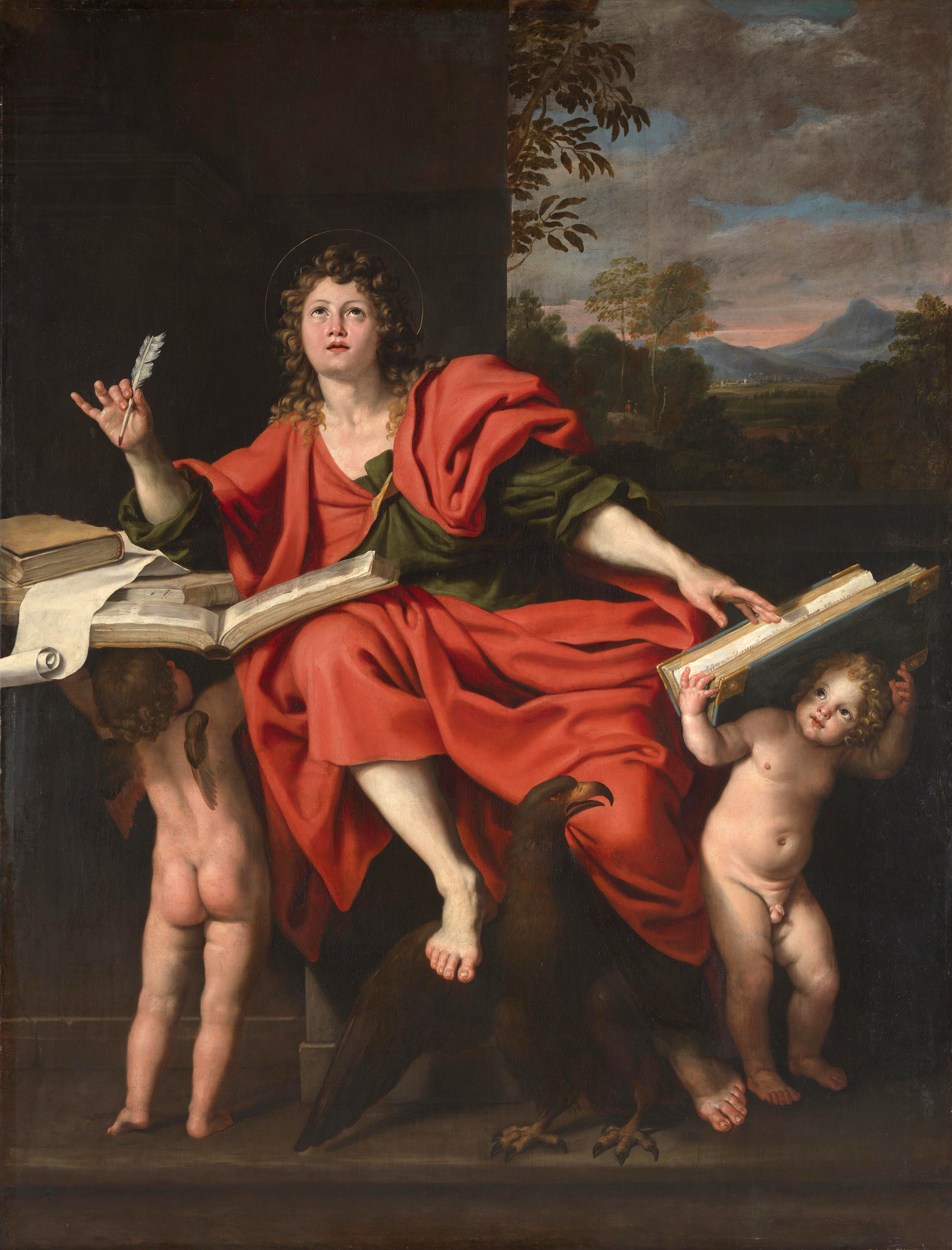
Light against darkness: Haldir's description of how Lothlórien opposes Mordor echoes John's Gospel. St John the Evangelist by Domenichino, c. 1626

=== Land of light ===
The Tolkien scholar Paul H. Kocher writes that Galadriel perceives Sauron with Lothlórien's light, "but cannot be pierced by it in return". The good intelligence has the "imaginative sympathy" to penetrate the evil intelligence, but not vice versa. The Christian author Elizabeth Danna writes that the Elf Haldir's explanation of this [from a flet or tree-platform high above Cerin Amroth], "In this high place you may see the two powers that are opposed to one another, and ever they strive now in thought; but whereas the light perceives the very heart of the darkness, its own secret has not yet been discovered" echoes a biblical description: "The light shineth in darkness; and the darkness comprehended it not." The scholar of humanities Susan Robbins notes that Tolkien, a devout Roman Catholic, associated light as the Bible does with "holiness, goodness, knowledge, wisdom, grace, hope, and God's revelation", and that Galadriel was one of the bearers of that light.

=== Earthly paradise ===
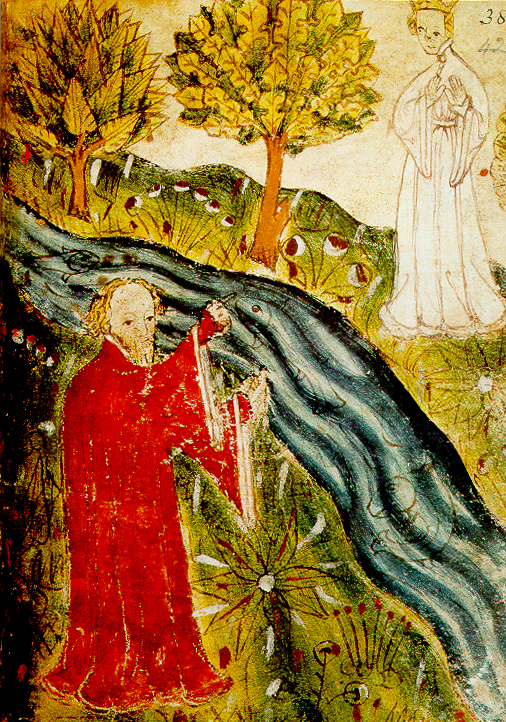
Earthly Paradise: Lothlórien has been compared to the place dreamed of in the Middle English poem Pearl. Miniature from Cotton Nero A.x shows the Dreamer on the other side of the stream from the Pearl-maiden.

Lothlórien is a locus amoenus, an idyllic land that Tolkien describes as having "no stain". The Tolkien scholar Tom Shippey notes that to get there, the Fellowship first wash off the stains of ordinary life by wading the River Nimrodel. He compares this perfect place to the Earthly Paradise that the dreamer speaks of in the Middle English poem Pearl. But then, Shippey writes, the Fellowship have to cross a rope-bridge over a second river, the Silverlode, which they must not drink from, and which the evil Gollum cannot cross. What place can they have come to then, he wonders: could they be "as if dead"?

Shippey notes however that it might be old England, the "'mountains green' of 'ancient time'" in William Blake's Jerusalem. As evidence, Shippey explains that when they come to the deepest part of Lothlórien, the Elf Haldir welcomes them, calling the area the Naith or "Gore", both unfamiliar words for the land between two converging rivers, the Celebrant (or Silverlode), and the Anduin, and then giving a third word with a special resonance: the "Angle". Shippey states that the name "England" comes from the Angle between the Flensburg Fjord and the River Schlei, in the north of Germany next to Denmark, the origin of the Angles among the Anglo-Saxons who founded England. (Note: England was founded in around the 5th and 6th centuries. The connection between the foundation of England and the mythology of Lord of the Rings is discussed further in the article on The Shire.) He suggests that Frodo's feeling that he has "stepped over a bridge of time into a corner of the Elder Days, and was now walking in a world that was no more" may be exactly correct.

Around late 1940, Tolkien attempted to illustrate Lothlórien in his pencil and coloured pencil painting "The Forest of Lothlorien in Spring". Wayne G. Hammond and Christina Scull question whether any artist could possibly capture "the sublime Elvish beauty of the mallorn-trees of Lothlórien". They write that this was when he was starting to write about the Elvish land, and that the painting "closely illustrates" Legolas's description of Lothlórien. They comment that it does not illustrate any of the scenes in The Lord of the Rings, since the Fellowship saw Lothlórien in winter, not spring. In their view, the painting demonstrates "Tolkien's mature coloured pencil technique" and is "very delicately drawn", but for the most part "without life".

=== Elfland where time is different ===
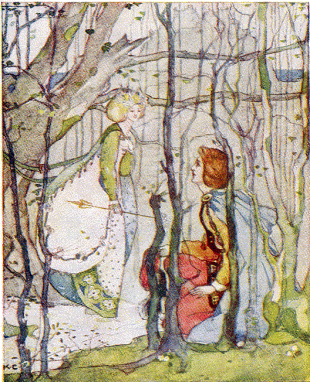
Time in Lothlórien was distorted, as it was in Elfland for Thomas the Rhymer. Illustration by Katherine Cameron, 1908

Shippey writes that in Lothlórien, Tolkien reconciles otherwise conflicting ideas regarding time-distortion in Elfland from European folklore, such as is exemplified in the medieval Thomas the Rhymer, who was carried off by the Queen of Elfland, and the Danish ballad Elvehøj (Elf Hill).

The Tolkien scholar Verlyn Flieger writes that the Fellowship debated how much time had passed while they were there, Sam Gamgee recalling that the moon was waning just before they arrived, and was new when they left, though they all felt they had only been there for a few days. She notes that Sam actually exclaims "Anyone would think that time did not count in there!", while Frodo sees Galadriel as "present and yet remote, a living vision of that which has already been left far behind by the flowing streams of Time" and Legolas, an Elf who ought to know how things work in Elven lands, says that time does not stop there, "but change and growth is not in all things and places alike. For Elves the world moves, and it moves both very swift and very slow. Swift, because they themselves change little, and all else fleets by. Slow, because they do not count the running years".

Shippey considers Legolas's explanation to resolve the apparent contradiction between the mortal and Elvish points of view about Elvish time. Flieger however writes that there is a definite contradiction between Frodo's position, that there is an actual difference in time between Lothlórien and everywhere else, and Legolas's, that it is a matter of perception. She considers Aragorn's view to reconcile these two positions, agreeing that time has passed as Legolas said, but that the Fellowship felt time as the Elves did while they were in Lothlórien. That is not, writes Flieger, the end of the matter, as she feels that Aragorn reintroduces the dilemma when he says that the moon carried on changing "in the world outside": this suggests once again that Lothlórien had its own laws of nature, as in a fairy tale.

Verlyn Flieger's analysis of the paradoxes of Elvish time in Lothlórien
Source	Story	Time
Thomas the Rhymer	Mortal enters Elfland. Spends a few nights there. Returns to find all friends dead, dim memory of a man lost visiting Elfland.	flows much more slowly in Elfland.
Elvehøj (Elf Hill)	Elf-maiden sings: "the swift stream then stood still"	flows much faster in Elfland; everything outside stops.
Frodo's view	Lothlórien "in a time that has elsewhere long gone by".	different epoch, long ago.
Legolas's view	Both fast and slow: Elves change little, "all else fleets by".	different perception of time's speed.
Aragorn's 1st view	Mortals feel time as Elves do while in Lothlórien.	different perception of time's speed.
Aragorn's 2nd view	But Moon went on changing "in the world outside".	different actual flow of time (as Thomas the Rhymer)

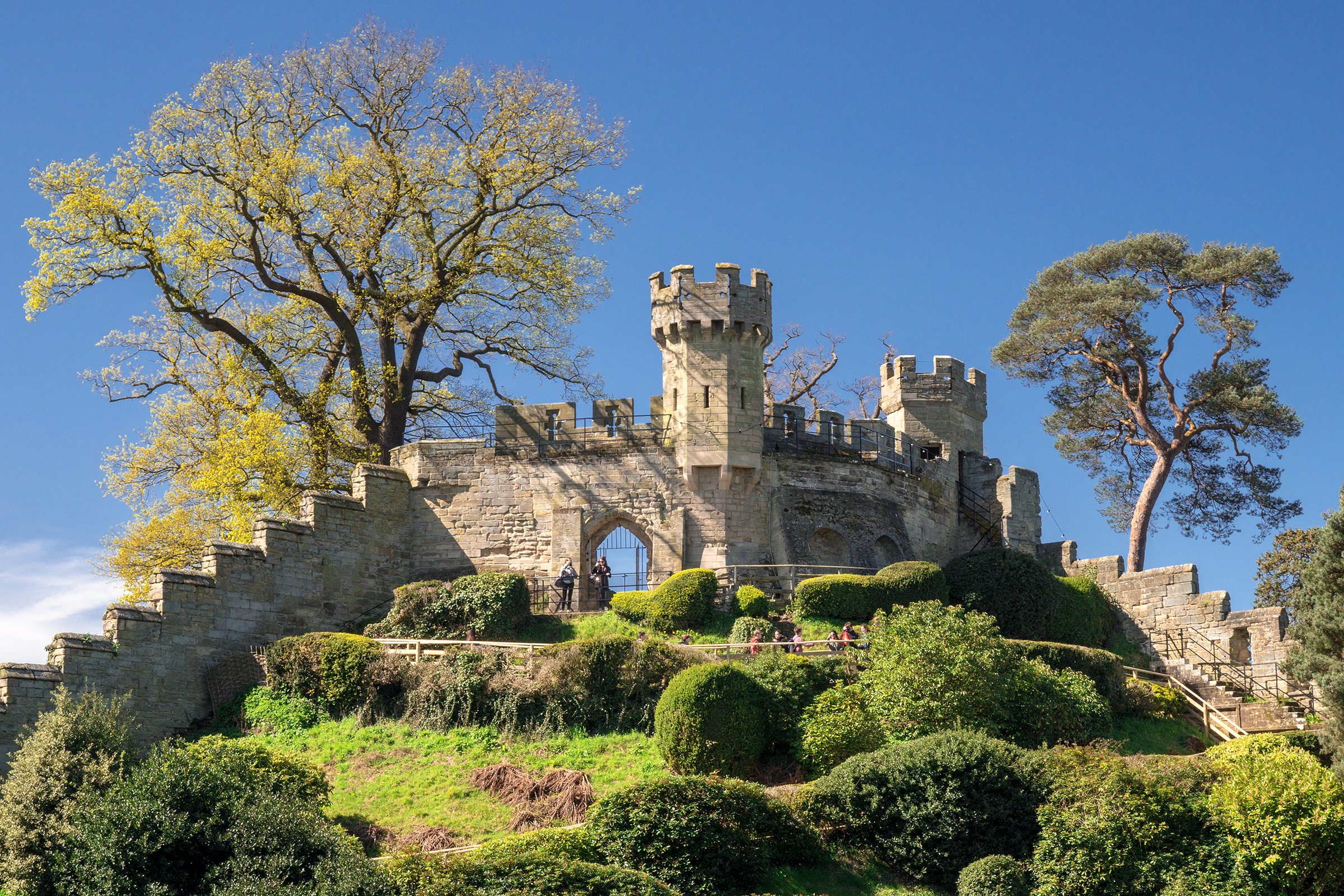
Cerin Amroth, a grassy mound surrounded by two circles of trees, has been compared to the Motte of Warwick Castle, Ethelfleda's Mound (pictured), where a young Tolkien went with his future wife Edith Bratt.

Flieger writes that while time is treated both naturally and supernaturally throughout The Lord of the Rings, his "most mystical and philosophical deployment of time" concerns Elves. It is therefore "no accident", she writes, that Frodo has multiple experiences of altered time in Lothlórien, from feeling he has crossed "a bridge of Time" on entering that land, to seeing Aragorn on Cerin Amroth as he was as a young man, dressed in white. Flieger notes that in The Monsters and the Critics Tolkien writes "The human-stories of the elves are doubtless full of the Escape from Deathlessness". (Note: Tolkien 1983, "On Fairy-stories", p. 153) In her view, this explains the exploration of time in his mythology, death and deathlessness being the "concomitants" of time and timelessness. (Note: Tolkien's themes of death and deathlessness are discussed further in the article The Tale of Aragorn and Arwen.)

=== A remembered Warwickshire ===
The author John Garth writes of a possible Warwickshire connection for Lothlórien. The young Tolkien and his fiancée Edith Bratt visited Warwick; in 1915 he wrote a celebration of Warwickshire, Kortirion Among the Trees. Garth suggests that the central green hill of Cerin Amroth in Lothlórien recalls the grassy Motte of Warwick Castle, known as Ethelfleda's Mound and the happy time he spent there in his youth.

== Adaptations ==
Lothlórien's appearance in The Lord of the Rings film trilogy was based on Alan Lee's artwork.

Lothlórien's appearance in Peter Jackson's The Lord of the Rings film trilogy was based on the artwork of the conceptual designer Alan Lee. Some of the Lothlórien scenes were shot on locations in Paradise Valley near Glenorchy, New Zealand.

In The Lord of the Rings Online: Mines of Moria, Lorien was a region introduced to the game in March 2009, which allows players to visit Caras Galadhon and other places, and complete quests from the elves.

Enya's song "Lothlórien" on her album Shepherd Moons is an instrumental composition named for the Elvish realm.

The Dutch composer Johan de Meij wrote music inspired by the Lothlórien woods, as the second movement, "Lothlórien (The Elvenwood)", of his Symphony No. 1 The Lord of the Rings.

== Sources ==
- Flieger, Verlyn (2006). "Time". In Drout, Michael D. C. (ed.). J. R. R. Tolkien Encyclopedia: Scholarship and Critical Assessment. Routledge. pp. 647–650. ISBN 0-415-96942-5.
- Foster, Robert (2003). The Complete Guide to Middle-earth. HarperCollins. ISBN 978-0-00-716942-9.
- Hammond, Wayne G.; Scull, Christina (1995). J.R.R. Tolkien: Artist and Illustrator. London: HarperCollins Publishers. ISBN 978-0-261-10322-1.
- Hammond, Wayne G.; Scull, Christina (2005). The Lord of the Rings: A Reader's Companion. London: HarperCollins. ISBN 0-00-720907-X.
- Kocher, Paul (1974) [1972]. Master of Middle-earth: The Achievement of J.R.R. Tolkien. Penguin Books. ISBN 0140038779.
- Shippey, Tom (2001). J. R. R. Tolkien: Author of the Century. HarperCollins. ISBN 978-0261-10401-3.
- Stanton, Michael N. (2006). "Lothlórien". In Drout, Michael D. C. (ed.). The J. R. R. Tolkien Encyclopedia: Scholarship and Critical Assessment. Routledge. pp. 394–395. ISBN 0-415-96942-5.
- Tolkien, J. R. R. (1980). Christopher Tolkien (ed.). Unfinished Tales. Boston: Houghton Mifflin. ISBN 978-0-395-29917-3.
- Tolkien, J. R. R. (1954a). The Fellowship of the Ring. The Lord of the Rings. Boston: Houghton Mifflin. OCLC 9552942.
- Tolkien, J. R. R. (1954). The Two Towers. The Lord of the Rings. Boston: Houghton Mifflin. OCLC 1042159111.
- Tolkien, J. R. R. (1983). The Monsters and the Critics, and Other Essays. London: Allen & Unwin. OCLC 417591085.
- Tolkien, J. R. R. (1955). The Return of the King. The Lord of the Rings. Boston: Houghton Mifflin. OCLC 519647821.
- Tolkien, J. R. R. (1987). Christopher Tolkien (ed.). The Lost Road and Other Writings. Boston: Houghton Mifflin. ISBN 0-395-45519-7.
