= The Lost Road and Other Writings =

Fifth of the 12 volumes of 'The History of Middle-earth'

- Editor: Christopher Tolkien
- Author: J. R. R. Tolkien
- Language: English
- Series: The History of Middle-earth
- Release number: 5
- Subject: Tolkien's legendarium conlanging
- Genre: High fantasy Literary analysis
- Publisher: Unwin Hyman (UK)
- Publication date: 1987
- Publication place: United Kingdom
- Media type: Print (hardback and paperback)
- Pages: 464 (paperback)
- ISBN: 978-0261102255
- Preceded by: The Shaping of Middle-earth
- Followed by: The History of The Lord of the Rings (4 vols)

The Lost Road and Other Writings – Language and Legend before 'The Lord of the Rings' is the fifth volume, published in 1987, of The History of Middle-earth, a series of compilations of drafts and essays written by J. R. R. Tolkien in around 1936–1937. It was edited and published posthumously by his son Christopher.

== Book ==
=== Contents ===
The Lost Road and Other Writings contains the following pieces:

1. The Early History of the Legend — an introduction to the following two pieces, detailing how Tolkien's correspondence with C. S. Lewis led to the writing of The Lost Road.
2. The Fall of Númenor — an early draft of what would become the Akallabêth.
3. The Lost Road — an unfinished time-travel story written in late 1936 that connects Tolkien's other tales to the 20th century.
4. The later Annals of Beleriand.
5. The later Annals of Valinor.
6. The Ainulindalë — an early version of the Ainulindalë (the Music of the Ainur).
7. The Lhammas ("Account of Tongues") — an overview of the various languages of Middle-earth.
8. Quenta Silmarillion — a draft of the Quenta Silmarillion.
9. The Etymologies — an etymological dictionary of the Elvish tongues, contemporary with writings up to that time.
10. Appendix
  1. The Genealogies
  2. The List of Names
  3. The Second Silmarillion Map

=== Inscription ===
The title page of each volume of The History of Middle-earth has an inscription in Tengwar, written by Christopher Tolkien and describing the contents of the book. The inscription in Volume V reads "Herein are collected the oldest Tale of the Downfall of Númenor, the story of the Lost Road into the West, the Annals of Valinor and the Annals of Beleriand in a later form, the Ainulindalë, or Music of the Ainur, the Lhammas, or Account of Tongues, the Quenta Silmarillion or History of the Silmarils, and the history of many words and names."

== Approach ==
Navigable diagram of Tolkien's legendarium. The two unfinished time travel novels served as a source of ideas for The Lord of the Rings.

The Lost Road itself was the result of a joint decision by Tolkien and C. S. Lewis to make attempts at writing science fiction. Lewis ended up writing a story about space travel, which eventually became The Space Trilogy, and Tolkien tried to write something about time travel, but never completed it. The Lost Road is a fragmentary beginning of a tale, with a rough outline and several pieces of narrative, including four chapters dealing with modern England and Númenor, from which the entire story may be glimpsed. The scheme was for time travel by means of "vision" or being mentally inserted into what had been so as to experience that which had happened. In this way the tale links the 20th century first to the Saxon England of Alfred the Great, then to the Lombard king Alboin of St Benedict's time, the Baltic Sea during the Viking Age, Ireland at the time of the Tuatha Dé Danann's coming (600 years after Noah's Flood), the prehistoric North in the Ice Age, a "Galdor story" of Middle-earth in the Third Age, and finally the Fall of Gil-galad, before recounting the prime legend of the Downfall of Númenor and the Bending of the World.

The story starts with Alboin, a child in 20th century Britain who has strange visions referencing the First and Second Ages of Middle-earth after talking to his father Oswin about his 6th century namesake, where he sees the clouds coming westwards over the Atlantic as resembling the great eagles of Manwë traveling to Númenor. Many years later as an adult, the dreams return to him as he starts to realize that they are actual memories from his ancestors, which he wishes he could see for himself. Fulfilling this wish, Elendil appears to him in another one of his dreams, offering to take him and his son Audoin to some time from the 3260s to the 3310s of the Second Age, which he accepts. The view of the distant past begins a conversation on the shores of Númenor about the state of the kingdom. Elendil tells his son Herendil that he is a member of the faithful who still support the Valar, trying to convince him of Sauron's corruption and negative influence over the king Tarkalion (Ar-Pharazôn). Herendil argues that Sauron has enlightened the Númenorians after his imprisonment and ascension to being the king's advisor, portraying the Valar as villains for keeping immortality from the species of men.

Elendil tells him the true history of Arda up until that point where mortality was a gift rather than a curse, and discusses how militaristic Númenor is becoming, despite not having any enemies, to foreshadow the attempted invasion of Aman. Herendil agrees to join the rebellion against Sauron in the safety of their house. The story breaks off at the end of the fourth chapter. The novel explores the theme of the "Straight Road" into the West, now open only in memory because the world has become round.

Tolkien reworked and expanded some of the time travel ideas from The Lost Road in The Notion Club Papers, which was also left unfinished.

== Reception ==
The Tolkien scholar Wayne G. Hammond, writing in Mallorn in 1995, comments that reactions to Christopher Tolkien's works are split "between those who find the series a tribute to his father's imagination, and those who merely ask Why?" He quotes Valerie Housden's 1988 review of The Lost Road and Other Writings from Vector as "typical": "A must for Tolkien freaks and those preparing doctorates, my cat and I agreed this book was a good excuse for a snooze on a rainy afternoon." Hammond replies that the "fan response" to The History of the Lord of the Rings implies a wider market than that.

Taum Santoski, in Mythlore, writes that the volume, with such items as The Etymologies, demonstrates Tolkien's "deep interest ... in revising his languages". He notes Christopher Tolkien's comment that his father "was perhaps more interested in the processes of [linguistic] change than he was in displaying the structure and use of the languages at any given time." Noting that people who wanted definitive forms of Quenya and Sindarin "will be disappointed", Santoski observes that the alternative forms of words, such as nume and numen ("West") are both "real". He comments that it is precisely "this incompleteness that makes all of the work of Tolkien so attractive". Santoski remarks, too, that in 1937, when The Hobbit had been published, "the currents of Tolkien's imagination" were evidently moving towards "a fusion": the Quenta Silmarillion was approaching completion; the languages had progressed; and his readers wanted a "new Hobbit". Santoski remarks that "Fortunately Mr. Baggins ... had a nephew."

== Sources ==
- Carpenter, Humphrey, ed. (2023) [1981]. The Letters of J. R. R. Tolkien: Revised and Expanded Edition. New York: HarperCollins. ISBN 978-0-35-865298-4.
- Flieger, Verlyn (1983). Splintered Light: Logos and Language in Tolkien's World. Grand Rapids, Michigan: William B. Eerdmans Publishing Company. ISBN 978-0-8028-1955-0.
