= Verlyn Flieger =

American author and editor

- Born: 1933 (age 92–93)
- Education: Catholic University of America (PhD)
- Notable work: Splintered Light; A Question of Time; Interrupted Music

Verlyn Flieger (born 1933) is an author, editor, and Professor Emerita in the Department of English at the University of Maryland at College Park, where she taught courses in comparative mythology, medieval literature, and the works of J. R. R. Tolkien. She is well known as a Tolkien scholar, especially for her books Splintered Light, A Question of Time, and Interrupted Music. She has won the Mythopoeic Scholarship Award four times for her work on Tolkien's Middle-earth writings.

== Biography ==
Flieger holds a master's degree (1972) and doctorate (1977) from The Catholic University of America, and has been associated with the University of Maryland since 1976. In 2012, retiring from teaching at Maryland, Flieger began teaching Arthurian studies online at Signum University.

Her best-known books are Splintered Light: Logos and Language in Tolkien's World (1983; revised edition, 2002), which argues that light is a central theme of Tolkien's Middle-earth mythology; A Question of Time: J. R. R. Tolkien's Road to Faërie, which won the 1998 Mythopoeic Award for Inklings studies; and Interrupted Music: The Making of Tolkien's Mythology (2005).

Flieger won the Mythopoeic Scholarship Award for Inklings Studies a second time in 2002 for Tolkien's Legendarium: Essays on The History of Middle-earth, which she co-edited with Carl Hostetter; In 2013, she won the Mythopoeic Award again for Green Suns and Faërie: Essays on J. R. R. Tolkien, and in 2019, for a fourth time, for There Would Always Be a Fairy Tale: More Essays on Tolkien.

Flieger has written two young adult fantasies, Pig Tale and The Inn at Corbies' Caww, a collection of Arthurian stories, Arthurian Voices, and some short stories. With David Bratman and Michael D. C. Drout, she is co-editor of Tolkien Studies: An Annual Scholarly Review.

== Reception ==
Bradford Eden describes Splintered Light as "the most important and influential book on both language and music in Tolkien's works", discussing how the two are interwoven as "central themes" throughout The Silmarillion.

J. S. Ryan, reviewing Tolkien's Legendarium for VII, called it a "luminous companion" to the 12 volumes of The History of Middle-earth, and "clearly indispensable". Ryan stated that it "pays a much merited tribute" to Christopher Tolkien's six decades or more of work on his father's writings, indeed from his childhood as one of the original audience for The Hobbit. Ryan describes the 14 essays as "carefully argued", noting among other things Bratman's description of the 4 styles Tolkien used in the Legendarium as "Annalistic, Antique, Appendical, and Philosophical".

Gergely Nagy, in Tolkien Studies, writes of Interrupted Music that it "opens ways" for other scholars working on The Silmarillion, and that as a good book should, it raises many research questions. He notes that Flieger takes the "interrupted music" of the Ainulindalë as a metaphor, "although probably accidental", for Tolkien's unfinished legendarium. Nagy finds the book's argument and writing "exemplarily clear and comprehensible".

== Books ==
=== Scholarly ===
written

- 1983 Splintered Light: Logos and Language in Tolkien's World (Wm. B. Eerdmans, 2002 edition ISBN 978-0873387446)
- 2001 A Question of Time: J.R.R. Tolkien's Road to Faërie, Wm. B. Eerdmans, ISBN 0-87338-699-X
- 2005 Interrupted Music: The Making Of Tolkien's Mythology, Kent State University Press, ISBN 0-87338-824-0
- 2012 Green Suns and Faerie: Essays on J.R.R. Tolkien, Kent State University Press, ISBN 978-1-60635-094-2
- 2019 There Would Always be a Fairytale: More Essays on Tolkien, Kent State University Press, ISBN 978-1-60635-308-0

edited

- 2000 Tolkien's Legendarium: Essays on The History of Middle-earth (with Carl Hostetter), ISBN 0-313-30530-7
- 2005 Smith of Wootton Major by J.R.R. Tolkien, extended critical edition, ISBN 0-00-720247-4
- 2008 Tolkien on Fairy-stories by J.R.R. Tolkien (with Douglas A. Anderson), ISBN 0-00-724466-5
- 2015 The Story of Kullervo by J.R.R. Tolkien, ISBN 978-0008131364
- 2016 The Lay of Aotrou and Itroun by J.R.R. Tolkien, ISBN 978-0008202132

=== Fiction ===
- 2000 "Avilion" in The Doom of Camelot, ed. James Lowder, ISBN 978-1928999096
- 2002 Pig Tale, ISBN 978-0-7868-0792-5
- 2005 "Green Hill Country" in Seekers of Dreams, ed. Douglas A. Anderson, ISBN 978-1593600488
- 2011 The Inn at Corbies' Caww, Kitsune Books, ISBN 978-0982740941
- 2020 Arthurian Voices, The Gabbro Head Press, ISBN 978-1732579934
