= Middle-earth peoples =

The fictional races and peoples that appear in J. R. R. Tolkien's fantasy world of Middle-earth include the seven listed in Appendix F of The Lord of the Rings: Elves, Men, Dwarves, Hobbits, Ents, Orcs and Trolls, as well as spirits such as the Valar and Maiar. Other beings of Middle-earth are of unclear nature such as Tom Bombadil and his wife Goldberry.

== Ainur ==
The Ainur are angelic spirits created by Eru Ilúvatar at the Beginning. The Ainur who subsequently enter the physical world of Middle-earth are the Valar ("powers"), though that term primarily means the mightiest among them. (Note: Tolkien 1977, "Ainulindale") Lesser spirits are called the Maiar. Most of the Valar and Maiar withdraw from Middle-earth to the Undying Lands of Valinor, though some of the Maiar assume mortal forms to help or hinder the peoples of Middle-earth, such as the Istari (Wizards), Melian, Balrogs, and the Dark Lord Sauron. (Note: Tolkien 1977, "Valaquenta", "Of the Maiar" and "Of the Enemies")

=== Wizards ===
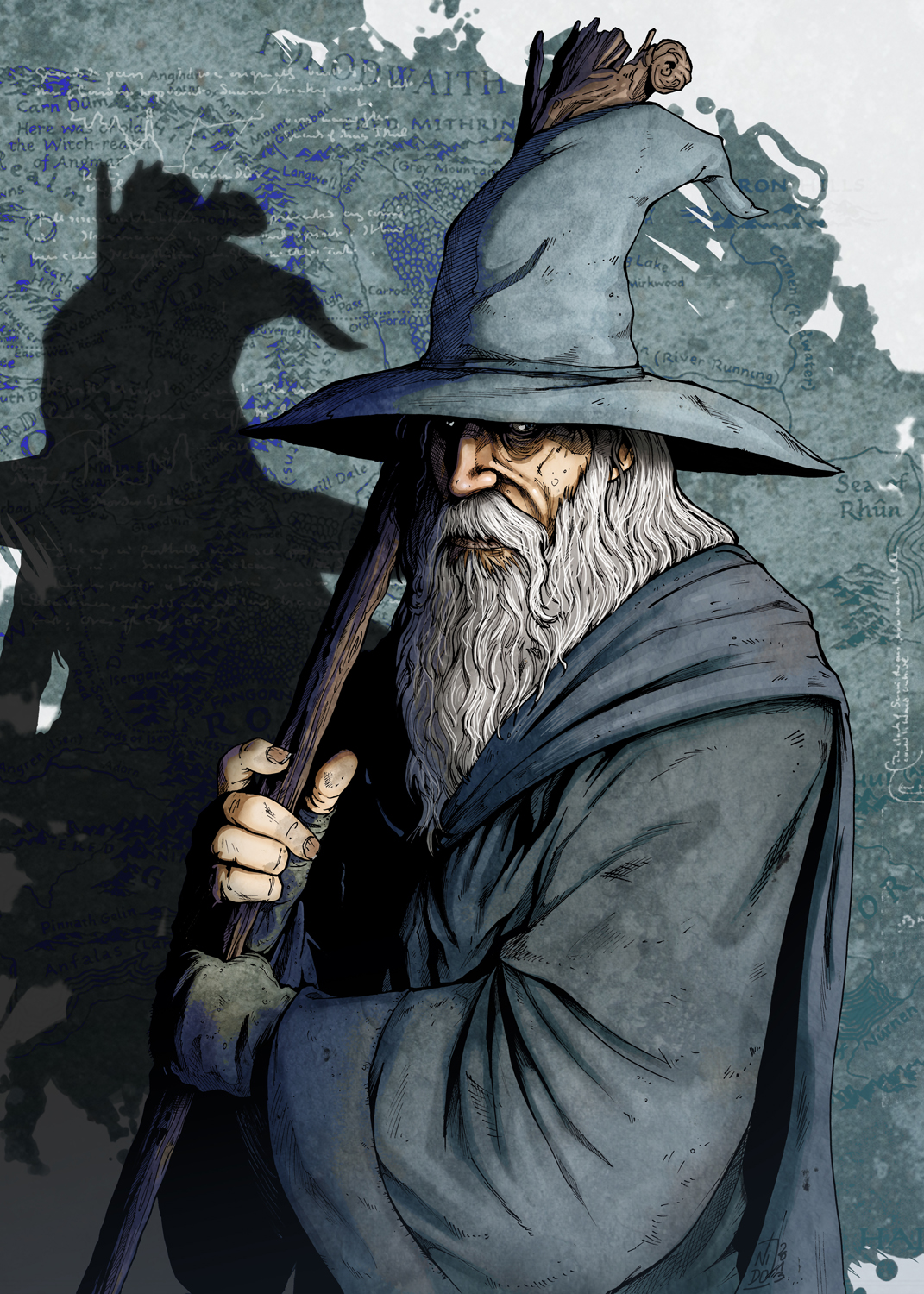
Wizards like Gandalf are Maiar but took the form of Men.

The wizards of Middle-earth are Maiar: spirits of the same order as the Valar, but lesser in power. (Note: Tolkien 1980 "The Istari") Outwardly resembling Men but possessing much greater physical and mental power, they are called Istari (Quenya for "Wise Ones") by the Elves. They are sent by the Valar to assist the people of Middle-earth to contest Sauron. The first three of these five wizards are known in the Mannish tongues of the Lord of the Rings series as Saruman "man of skill" (Rohirric), Gandalf "elf of the staff" (northern Men), and Radagast "tender of beasts" (possibly Westron). Tolkien never provided non-Elvish names for the other two; one tradition gives their names in Valinor as Alatar and Pallando, and another as Morinehtar and Rómestámo in Middle-earth. (Note: Tolkien 1996, p. 384–385.) Each wizard in the series has robes of a characteristic colour: white for Saruman (the chief and the most powerful of the five), grey for Gandalf, brown for Radagast, and sea-blue for the remaining two, known consequently as the Blue Wizards.

Gandalf and Saruman play important roles in The Lord of the Rings, while Radagast appears only briefly, innocently helping Saruman to deceive Gandalf, who believes Radagast since he is honest, and fortuitously alerting Gwaihir to rescue Gandalf again. The Blue Wizards do not feature in the story; they are said to have journeyed far into the east after their arrival in Middle-earth.

As the Istari are Maiar, each one serves a Vala in some way. Saruman was the servant and helper of Aulë, and so learned much in the art of craftsmanship, mechanics, and metal-working, as was seen in the later Third Age. Gandalf was the servant of Manwë or Varda, but was a lover of the Gardens of Lórien, and so knew much of the hopes and dreams of Men and Elves. Radagast, servant of Yavanna, loved the things of nature, both animals and plants. As each of these Istari learned from their Vala, so they acted in Middle-earth.

=== Balrogs ===
Demonic creatures of fire and shadow, Balrogs are fallen Maiar, loyal to the first Dark Lord, Morgoth. They participated in the wars of the First Age of Middle-earth but are mostly destroyed during the War of Wrath which ended the Age. (Note: Tolkien 1977 "Valaquenta") (Note: Tolkien 1977 ch. 3 "Of the Coming of the Elves and the Captivity of Melkor") By the Third Age, the only remaining Balrog was "Durin's Bane," the Balrog of Moria, killed by Gandalf. (Note: Tolkien 1954a, book 2, ch. 5 "The Bridge of Khazad-dûm")

== Free peoples ==
The Free Peoples of Middle-earth are the four races that never fell under the sway of the evil spirits Morgoth or Sauron: Elves, Men, Dwarves and Ents. Strictly speaking, among Men it was only the Men of the West who are Free People, particularly the descendants of the Dúnedain of the Isle of Númenor, as most Men of the East and South of Middle-earth become servants of Morgoth and Sauron over the ages. The Ent Treebeard quotes lines from a traditional lay listing them: (Note: Tolkien 1954, Book 3, Chapter 4 "Treebeard")

First name the four, the free peoples
Eldest of all, the elf-children
Dwarf the delver, dark are his houses
Ent the earthborn, old as mountains
Man the mortal, master of horses

After encountering the hobbits Merry and Pippin, he consents that hobbits are a fifth free people, adding a fifth line, "Half-grown hobbits, the hole-dwellers".

=== Dwarves ===
The race of Dwarves prefers to live in mountains and caves, settling in places such as Erebor (the Lonely Mountain), the Iron Hills, the Blue Mountains, and Moria (Khazad-dûm) in the Misty Mountains. Aulë the Smith creates Dwarves; he invents the Dwarven language, known as Khuzdul. Dwarves mine and work precious metals throughout the mountains of Middle-earth. The seven different groups of Dwarf-folk originate in the locations where the Seven Fathers of the Dwarves first awoke before the First Age.

=== Elves ===
The Elves, or Firstborn, are the first of Eru's Children to awaken. Born under the stars before the ascension of the Moon and the Sun, they retain a love for light and an inner spirit endowed with unique gifts. They call themselves the Quendi, or "Speakers", for they are the first to utter words; and, even now, no race understands language and song like the Firstborn. They can see as well under moon or starlight as a man at the height of day. (Note: Tolkien 1977, "Of the Coming of the Elves and the Captivity of Melkor") They cannot become sick or scarred. If an Elf should die, from violence or losing the will to live from grief, their spirit goes to the halls of Mandos, as they are bound to Arda and cannot leave until the world is broken and remade. Elvens are agile: for instance they can walk atop freshly fallen snow without leaving a trace of their passing. On a clear day they can see ten miles with clarity and detail up to 100 miles. Despite this, they are strongly bound to Fate (see Mandos) and hated by Morgoth.

The Quendi are sundered after the awakening and many sub-groups appear. The First Sundering occurs when some left Middle-earth to live in the blessed realm of Valinor, while others stayed behind. This produces the Eldar, who accept the call to come to Valinor, and the Avari, who refuse the great journey. Elves who stay in Middle-earth and never see the light of the trees become known as the Moriquendi or "Dark-elves". This does not imply that the Dark-elves are evil.

On the journey to Valinor, some of the Teleri ("Those who tarried") abandon the main group, and those of them who did not mingle with the Moriquendi become the Laiquendi (Green-elves), the Sindar (Grey-elves) and the Nandor. These elves of the great journey who remain in Middle-earth are then called the Úmanyar (The Unwilling). The Eldar who reach Valinor are eventually divided into three distinct groups: Vanyar, Noldor and Teleri. These three groups become known as the Calaquendi or "Light-elves" because they saw the light of the Two Trees of Valinor. (Note: Tolkien 1977 Tables: "The Sundering of the Elves") Later some of the Noldor go back to Middle-earth in their quest for the Silmarils, while the Vanyar remain in Valinor.

In Tolkien's earliest writings, elves are variously named sprites, fays, brownies, pixies, or leprawns. By 1915, when Tolkien was writing his first elven poems, the words elf, fairy and gnome had many divergent and contradictory associations. Tolkien was gently warned against the term 'fairy', probably for its growing association with homosexuality. Tolkien eventually chose the term elf over fairy. In his 1939 essay On Fairy-Stories, Tolkien wrote that "English words such as elf have long been influenced by French (from which fay and faërie, fairy are derived); but in later times, through their use in translation, fairy and elf have acquired much of the atmosphere of German, Scandinavian, and Celtic tales, and many characteristics of the huldu-fólk, the daoine-sithe, and the tylwyth-teg."

=== Men ===
During the time of The Lord of the Rings, Men live in many places in Middle-earth, with the largest group of free men in the countries of Gondor and Rohan. When the island of Númenor falls, only the Faithful escape and found the twin kingdoms of Gondor and Arnor. The Faithful are known in Middle-earth as the Dúnedain, and as leaders of these kingdoms, they are able to lead the resistance to Sauron, and preserve the Men of the West as Free People.

There are also free men at the village of Bree, at Esgaroth, in Drúadan Forest (home to "wild men" known as Drúedain or Woses), and in the icy regions of Forochel. Those who serve evil powers, such as the men of Dunland, Rhûn, Harad, and Umbar, are not considered free men. Men bear the so-called Gift of Men, mortality. The descendants of the Dúnedain include the Rangers of the North and the Rangers of Ithilien.

==== Drúedain ====
The Drúedain, one of the earliest varieties of men, live in small numbers, often in tribes. They are little folk, shorter than dwarves, yet taller than hobbits. They are known for their voodoo-like magic, their black eyes, which glow red when they are angry, and their ability to sit for hours and days on end without moving or blinking. They grow little hair, except that on their heads and sometimes small tufts on their chins. They are short and stout, and other men tend to dislike them due to their harsh, rough voices. Their laughter is full of mirth. (Note: Tolkien 1955, Book 5, ch. 5, "The Ride of the Rohirrim".) It is said that their skill of stonework rivals the Dwarves'. The Drughu are not evil. They are mortal enemies of orcs, defending the homes of their human neighbours with their own lives and with the aid of their magical Watch-Stones. The Elves of Beleriand develop a special fondness for them and value their skill at fighting orcs.

=== Ents ===
Ents are an ancient race of tree-like creatures, having become like the trees that they shepherd. They are created by Yavanna and given life by Ilúvatar. By the Third Age, they are a dwindling race, having long ago lost their mates, the Entwives. (Note: Tolkien 1954, book 3, ch. 4: "Treebeard".) (Note: Tolkien 1955, book 6, ch. 6 "Many Partings")

==== Huorns ====
Close kin of the Ents, Huorns are animated trees that possess sentience. They are said to have voices but can only be understood by the Ents. Tolkien allowed it to remain ambiguous as to whether Huorns are simply trees that become aware, or Ents that become more "treeish" over time. Huorns are found in Fangorn Forest and possibly the Old Forest near Buckland. Legolas mentions that the Elves helped to wake up the trees. The Huorns decide the Battle of Helm's Deep, destroying Saruman's army of Orcs when they flee towards them. (Note: Tolkien 1954, book 3, ch. 7 "Helm's Deep")

=== Hobbits ===
Hobbits are a race of Middle-earth, also known as 'halflings' on account of their short stature. They are characterized by curly hair on their heads and leathery feet with furry insteps; they do not wear shoes. Many hobbits live in the Shire as well as Bree, and they once lived in the vales of the Anduin. They are fond of an unadventurous life of farming, eating, and socializing. There are three types of Hobbits. The Harfoots are the most numerous, while the Stoors have an affinity for water, boats and swimming, and the Fallohides are the most adventurous. The origin of hobbits is unclear, but of all the races they have the closest affinity to men. In the Prologue to The Lord of the Rings, Tolkien calls them relatives of men. (Note: Tolkien 1954a, Prologue.)

== Enslaved peoples ==
Enslaved peoples are those races that have fallen under the sway of the evil spirits Morgoth and Sauron, also known by the Free Peoples as 'Servants of the Enemy'. They included Orcs, Trolls and Men. The origin of Orcs and Trolls is unclear, but they are races that are taken by Morgoth and corrupted through sorcery into their final evil nature and appearance. Men are rarely corrupted by Morgoth or Sauron in the same way. Rather, their hearts and minds are corrupted by power and evil impulses, while they retain the physical appearance of men. Prolonged service to Sauron however, is capable of turning the bearers of the Rings of Power from Men into the wraith-like Nazgûl. Those men who are the servants of Morgoth or Sauron are mostly from the east and south of Middle-earth.

=== Evil Men ===
Not all Men are on the side of good; the Men who lived in the east and south are under Sauron's dominion. They included the Haradrim or Southrons, the Black Númenóreans who pledged their allegiance to Mordor (and later the Corsairs of Umbar), along with many different Easterling peoples, such as the Balchoth, the Wainriders, and the Men of Khand, who attacked Gondor and Rohan on numerous occasions. The Wild Men of Dunland served as agents to the traitorous wizard Saruman. In the First Age, some Easterlings are under Morgoth's dominion.

==== Ringwraiths ====
The Ringwraiths, also known as Nazgûl or Black Riders, were once great Men who are given Rings of Power by Sauron. These gradually corrupt them until they became slaves to the Dark Lord's will. Clad in dark hooded cloaks and riding demonic steeds or flying "fell beasts", the Ringwraiths forever hunt for the One Ring to bring it back to their master. (Note: Tolkien 1977 "Of the Rings of Power and the Third Age") (Note: Tolkien 1977 "The Akallabêth") (Note: Tolkien 1980 4. "The Hunt for the Ring" i. "Of the Journey of the Black Riders")

=== Orcs ===
Orcs are a race first bred by Morgoth, mostly living in mountain caves and disliking sunlight. Many of them live in the Misty Mountains, while others live in Mordor. They are also known as goblins. The Orcs are not created, since "evil cannot create, only corrupt" in Tolkien's philosophical perspective. Tolkien struggled to provide an account of their origins that he could accept. One version postulates that they are Elves who are corrupted and whose appearance has changed over time, but Tolkien wrote other accounts, in an attempt to resolve the dilemma of how they could be sentient and wholly evil.

Sauron and Saruman the wizard breeds an unusually large and powerful type of orc, the Uruk-hai. Although most orcs do not like the sun and could not bear to be in it, the Uruk-hai can stand daylight. (Note: Tolkien 1954, "The Riders of Rohan") Deformed half-orcs exist, crossbred from Men and Orcs. (Note: Tolkien 1954, book 3, ch. 9 "Flotsam and Jetsam") Tolkien uses the term "Goblin" mainly interchangeably with Orc. (Note: Tolkien 1954a Foreword)

=== Trolls ===
Trolls are said to have been created by Morgoth "in mockery of" the Ents. They dislike the sun, and some types, like the three Trolls from The Hobbit, turn to stone if exposed to sunlight. Trolls dwell in the Misty Mountains as well as in Mordor. Sauron breeds the Olog-hai: large, clever, and resistant to the sun. (Note: Tolkien 1955 Appendix F "Of Other Races") (Note: Tolkien 1954a, book 2, ch. 5 "The Bridge of Khazad-dûm") (Note: Tolkien 1955, book 5, ch. 4 "The Siege of Gondor") (Note: Tolkien 1955, book 5, ch. 10, "The Black Gate Opens")

=== Barrow-wights ===
Barrow-wights, from Middle English wight, a man, are dark spirits sent by the Witch-king of Angmar to possess and animate the bodies and bones of the former kings of the Dúnedain. These undead monsters haunt the Barrow-downs near Bree. (Note: Tolkien 1954a, book 1, ch. 8 "Fog on the Barrow-downs")

== Other beings ==
=== Tom Bombadil ===
Tom Bombadil does not belong to any of the peoples of Middle-earth; Tolkien calls him the spirit of the countryside. (Note: Carpenter 2023, #19 to Stanley Unwin, 16 December 1937) Unlike the other races, he is seemingly unaffected by the One Ring and appears to have existed before the Children of Ilúvatar (Elves and Men). As to the nature of Bombadil, Tolkien himself said that some things should remain mysterious in any mythology, "especially if an explanation actually exists." (Note: Carpenter 2023, #144 to Naomi Mitchison, 25 April 1954) (Note: Tolkien 1954a book 1, ch. 6, "The Old Forest") (Note: Tolkien 1954a book 1, ch. 7, "In the House of Tom Bombadil")

=== River-spirits ===
Spirits of nature tied to rivers and waterways. Only two are mentioned by Tolkien: Goldberry, the wife of Tom Bombadil, and her mother the River-woman. It is unknown whether these beings are unique, part of a larger race, or a form of Maiar.

=== Giants ===
Giants (or Ettens) other than Ents are mentioned only a few times by Tolkien. In The Hobbit, stone giants of the Misty Mountains are briefly mentioned, being said to lob stones at Thorin and Company. (Note: Tolkien 1937, "Over Hill and Under Hill")

=== Dragons ===
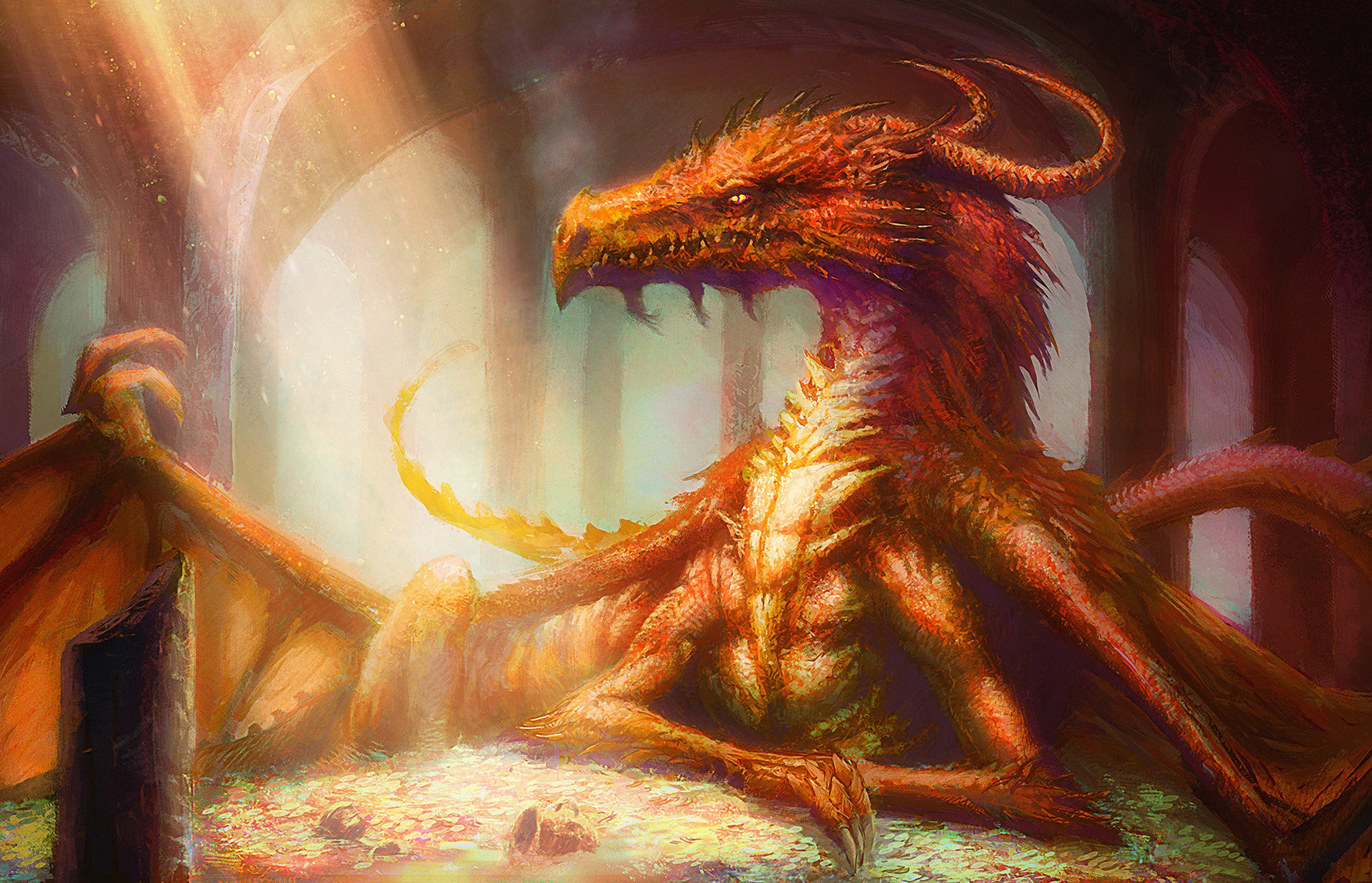
Smaug in fan art

Dragons are already present in The Book of Lost Tales. Tolkien had been fascinated with dragons since childhood, (Note: Tolkien 1964 "On Fairy-Stories") and he named four dragons in his Middle-earth writings. Like the Old Norse dragon Fafnir, they are able to speak, and can be subtle of speech.

Glaurung, in The Silmarillion, is the Father of Dragons in Tolkien's legendarium, the first of the Fire-drakes of Angband. Tolkien wrote that Glaurung had four legs and no wings and could not fly, and sired the brood of Urulóki, wingless fire-breathing dragons. (Note: Tolkien 1977, ch. 20 "Of the Fifth Battle". "Glaurung and his brood...") He was bred by Morgoth from some unknown stock and was the first dragon to appear outside of Angband. Glaurung is the main antagonist of The Children of Húrin, and his deceptive actions led to the suicides of its main characters Túrin Turambar and Niënor Níniel. (Note: Tolkien 1977, ch. 18 "Of the Ruin of Beleriand and the Fall of Fingolfin")

Ancalagon the Black (Sindarin: rushing jaws from anc 'jaw', alag 'impetuous' (Note: Tolkien 1987 "The Etymologies")) was the first of the winged Fire-drakes and the greatest of all dragons, bred by Morgoth during the First Age, as told in The Silmarillion. Ancalagon is so large that his body crushed "the towers of Thangorodrim" when he fell on them after being killed by Eärendil. (Note: Tolkien 1977 ch. 24 "Of the Voyage of Eärendil and the War of Wrath")

Scatha was a mighty "long-worm" of the Grey Mountains. He was killed by Fram in the early days of the Éothéod. After slaying Scatha, Fram's ownership of his recovered hoard was disputed by the Dwarves of that region. Fram rebuked this claim, sending them instead Scatha's teeth, with the words, "Jewels such as these you will not match in your treasuries, for they are hard to come by." This led to his death in a feud with the Dwarves. The Éothéod retained at least some of the hoard, and brought it south with them when they settled in Rohan. The silver horn that Éowyn gave to Merry Brandybuck after the War of the Ring, crucial in "The Scouring of the Shire", came from this hoard.

Smaug of Erebor, the Lonely Mountain, was killed by Bard the Bowman in Dale, as told in The Hobbit. Smaug serves as a main antagonist of Thorin and Company, as they seek to reclaim the Dwarven kingdom of Erebor that Smaug had taken. (Note: Tolkien 1937 chs. 1 "An Unexpected Party", 14 "Fire and Water")
