= Valarin =

Language of the Valar in Tolkien's Lengendarium

- Created by: J. R. R. Tolkien
- Setting and usage: Middle-earth
- Ethnicity: Valar
- Purpose: Constructed: Artistic; Fictional; Languages of Arda; Valarin

Language codes
- ISO 639-3: None (mis)
- Glottolog: None

Valarin is a fictional language in the fantasy works of J. R. R. Tolkien. One of the languages of Arda in Tolkien's Middle-earth legendarium, Valarin is the language spoken by the Valar. As immortal spiritual beings, Tolkien described the Valar as having the ability to communicate through thought, with no need for a spoken language. He implied that it was adopted as part of their assumption of physical, humanlike forms.

== External history ==
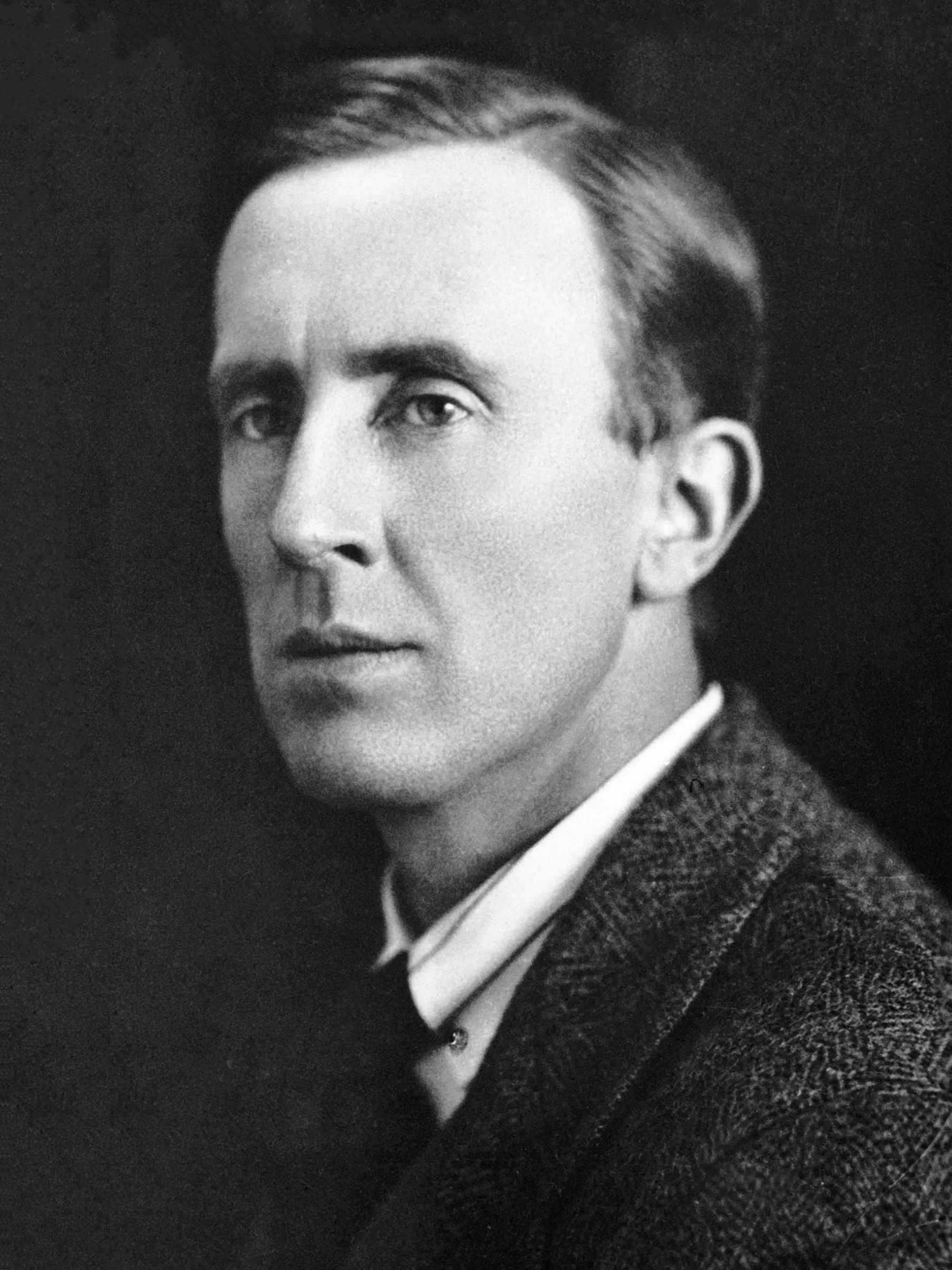
J. R. R. Tolkien enjoyed inventing languages such as Valarin.

Tolkien at first decided that Valarin, the tongue of the Valar as it is called in the Elvish language Quenya, would be the proto-language of the Elves, the language Oromë taught to the speechless Elves. He then developed the Valarin tongue and a grammar for it in the early 1930s. (Note: Tolkien 1987, ch. 7 The Lhammas) In the 1940s, he decided to drop that idea, and the tongue he had developed became Primitive Quendian instead. (Note: Tolkien 2009, p. 72 "Tengwesta Qenderinwa") He then conceived an entirely new tongue for the Valar, still called Valarin in Quenya. (Note: Tolkien 1994, pp. 397–407)

== Internal story ==
The Valar, as spiritual immortal beings, have the ability to communicate through thought and have no need for a spoken language, but it appears that Valarin develops because of their assumption of physical, humanlike (or elf-like) forms. Valarin is unrelated to the other languages constructed by J. R. R. Tolkien. Only a few words (mainly proper names) of Valarin are recorded by the Elves.

=== Early conception ===
According to the earlier conception set forth in Tolkien's sociolinguistic text, the Lhammas, the Valarin language family is subdivided into Oromëan, the Dwarves' Khuzdul (Aulëan), and Melkor's Black Speech. In this work, all Elvish languages are descended from the tongue of Oromë, while the Dwarves speak the tongue devised by Aulë, and the Black Speech of the Orcs is invented for them by Melkor. (Note: Tolkien 1987 ch. 7 "The Lhammas") Tolkien placed Valarin at the root of each version of his "Tree of Tongues", indicating that in his conception at the time of the Lhammas, it was the original language from which developed all the languages of Middle-earth. Tolkien attributed his "Descent of Tongues" to the Elvish linguist Rúmil, in one of his frame stories. His biographer John Garth comments that while Rúmil's lack of omniscience might seem convenient, saving Tolkien from having to work on Valarin in any detail, "the unknown is essential to the legendarium, part of the illusion of depth so vital to its aura of authenticity." (Note: Tolkien 2009, p. 23 "Lambion Ontale: Descent of Tongues", "Tengwesta Qenderinwa")

The structure of the root of the first "Tree of Tongues" in the Lhammas is:

- Valarin
  - Language of the Valarindi (some of these junior Valar became Maiar in Tolkien's later conception)
  - [Vala] Oromë: Languages of the Quendi (Tolkien gives much detail of the branches of the tree here)
  - [Vala] Aulë: Khuzdul (language of the Dwarves)
  - [former Vala]: Melko: Orcish languages

=== Later conception ===
Tolkien described Valarin as being strange to the ears of the Elves, sometimes to the point of genuine displeasure. (Note: Tolkien 1994 p. 398) He wrote that few of them ever learn the language, only adopting some Valarin words into their own language, Quenya. The Valar know Quenya and use it to converse with the Elves, or with each other if Elves are present. Valarin contains sounds that the Elves find difficult to produce, and the words are mostly long; for example, the Valarin word for Telperion, one of the Two Trees of Valinor, Ibrîniðilpathânezel, has eight syllables. The Vanyar adopt more words into their Vanyarin Tarquesta dialect from Valarin than the Noldor, as they lived closer to the Valar. Some of the Elven names of the Valar, such as Manwë, Ulmo, and Oromë, are adapted loanwords of their Valarin names.

== Grammar ==
Almost nothing is known of the grammar of Valarin. A plural is formed with -um- as an infix; so, Mâchanâz becomes in the plural Mâchanumâz, meaning "Authorities, Aratar".

Verb endings are not explained. Tolkien gives akašân as "he says" (present tense); dušamanûðân is "marred" (passive participle) and amanaišal as "unmarred" (hence Aman, the unmarred continent of the Valar), but he does not supply the roots of the associated verbs. The linguist Helge Fauskanger notes that the exact structure of the endings for these verb forms cannot be determined from this limited evidence.

One other possibility relates to the word ayanûz, meaning Ainu, one of the Valar or Maiar; Fauskanger notes that Tolkien states that ayanu- means "the name of the Spirits of Eru's first creation", perhaps suggesting that from that root, ayanûz might be the nominative singular form.
