= Lambengolmor =

Lambengolmor may refer to:

- Elven 'philologists', in the fictional language Quenya, an Elvish language of Middle-earth
- an Internet forum for languages constructed by Tolkien
