= Lhammas =

Linguistic work by J. R. R. Tolkien

The Lhammas (/ˈɬɑ.mɑs/; Noldorin for 'Account of Tongues') is a work of fictional sociolinguistics, written by J. R. R. Tolkien in 1937, and published in the 1987 The Lost Road and Other Writings, volume five of The History of Middle-earth series.

Tolkien, a philologist, became fascinated by constructed languages, and invented stories to provide his languages with a suitable world, Middle-earth. This resulted in The Lord of the Rings and The Silmarillion. He peopled Middle-earth with Elves and other races, and in the Lhammas presented the theory that all Middle-earth's languages had a shared origin. In the document, he diagrammed the resulting "Tree of Tongues" and described the fictional history of the evolution of some 30 Elvish languages.

Scholars have noted the realism of Tolkien's family of Elvish languages, analogous to the Indo-European family, as well as his changing views of their linguistic history, which he shifted radically soon after creating the Lhammas. The result was that the Noldorin language described in the document and in the contemporaneous The Etymologies, soon became the Sindarin found in The Lord of the Rings, while the new Noldorin became just a dialect of Quenya; Tolkien redrew his "Tree of Tongues" accordingly.

== Context ==
=== Tolkien's philology ===
From his schooldays, J. R. R. Tolkien was in his biographer John Garth's words "effusive about philology"; his schoolfriend Rob Gilson called him "quite a great authority on etymology". Tolkien was a professional philologist, a scholar of comparative and historical linguistics. He was especially familiar with Old English and related languages. He remarked to the poet and The New York Times book reviewer Harvey Breit that "I am a philologist and all my work is philological"; he explained to his American publisher Houghton Mifflin that this was meant to imply that his work was:

all of a piece, and fundamentally linguistic in inspiration. ... The invention of languages is the foundation. The 'stories' were made rather to provide a world for the languages than the reverse. To me a name comes first and the story follows.

The Tolkien scholar Verlyn Flieger writes that

it is important to remember that all of Tolkien's studies, the focus of his profession, was a concentration on the importance of the word. His profession as philologist and his vocation as writer of fantasy/theology overlapped and mutually supported one another".

In other words, Flieger writes, Tolkien "did not keep his knowledge in compartments; his scholarly expertise informs his creative work." This expertise was founded, in her view, on the belief that one knows a text only by "properly understanding [its] words, their literal meaning and their historical development."

=== Middle-earth ===
Tolkien is best known as the author of the high fantasy works The Hobbit and The Lord of the Rings, both set in Middle-earth. He created a family of invented languages for Elves, carefully designing the differences between them to reflect their distance from their imaginary common origin. He stated that his languages led him to create the invented mythology of The Silmarillion, to provide a world in which his languages could have existed. In that world, the splintering of the Elvish peoples mirrored the fragmentation of their languages.

== Text ==
The Lhammas was written in 1937. It exists in three versions. The two long versions, A and B, are closely similar, so Christopher Tolkien published B in The Lost Road and Other Writings, annotating it with A's minor variations on the text. The third, latest, and much the shortest version is the Lammasethen.

=== Theory of Middle-earth languages ===
The Lhammas as published presents the theory that all the languages of Middle-earth descend from Valarin, the language of the angelic beings or Valar, and were divided into three branches:

- Oromëan, named after Oromë, who taught the first Elves to speak. All languages of Elves and most languages of Men are Oromëan.
- Aulëan, named after Aulë, maker of the Dwarves, is the origin of the Khuzdul language. It has had some influences on the Mannish languages.
- Melkian, named after the rebellious Melkor or Morgoth, is the origin in the First Age of the many tongues used by the Orcs and other evil beings. This tongue is unrelated to the Black Speech that Sauron created.

A detail of Tolkien's "Tree of Tongues" in the Lhammas. The tree summarises the development of the Elvish language family over thousands of years. Shown here is the process by which Noldorin becomes the language of the Elvish city of Gondolin in Beleriand; it would have had to evolve extremely rapidly to do so. Soon after the image was made, Tolkien radically reconstructed the history of the languages and of the Noldor Elves to make the language evolution fit the timeline better.

The Elves developed the language they were taught into the language of the Laiquendi ('Green Elves') and Eldarin, the shared language of the Eldar. This in turn gave rise to the languages of the three divisions of the Eldar, Lindarin, Noldorin, and Telerin. What Tolkien called "Elf-Latin", Qenya, the classical and ancient language of the Eldar, derived from Lindarin with influence from Noldorin.

=== Ósanwe-kenta ===
The Ósanwe-kenta, or Enquiry into the Communication of Thought, was written as a typescript of eight pages, probably in 1960, and was first published in Vinyar Tengwar (vol. 39) in 1998. Within its fictional context, a frame story, the text is presented as a summary by an unnamed editor of the last chapter of the Lhammas. The subject-matter is "direct thought-transmission" (telepathy), or sanwe-latya ("thought-opening") in Quenya. The frame story character Pengolodh included it as last chapter to the Lhammas because of the implications of spoken language on thought-transmission, and since the Incarnates (Elves and Men) use a spoken language, telepathy can become more difficult with time.

== Analysis ==
=== Frame story ===
Tolkien later revised the internal history of the Elvish languages, stating that the Elves were capable of constructing their own languages, but did not update the Lhammas to be coherent with this. The document as it stands in The Lost Road and Other Writings can be thus seen as an interpolated manuscript, badly translated by Men in the Fourth Age or even later: "For many thousands of years have passed since the fall of Gondolin." In Tolkien's frame story, no autograph manuscripts of the Lhammas of Pengolodh remained; the three surviving manuscripts came from the original manuscript through an unknown number of intermediate copies. A tradition of philological study of Elvish languages exists within the fiction; Tolkien mentions that "The older stages of Quenya were, and doubtless still are, known to the loremasters of the Eldar. It appears from these notices that besides certain ancient songs and compilations of lore that were orally preserved, there existed also some books and many ancient inscriptions."

Timeline of the supposed survival of the Lhammas
Time	Events
First Age	Elves in Beleriand; Fall of Gondolin; Beleriand destroyed The Elf Pengolodh writes the Lhammas in Sindarin
Second Age	(Númenor drowned)
Third Age	(The War of the Ring)
Fourth Age	Men find and translate the manuscript, badly, into Westron
Fifth Age	———
Sixth/Seventh Age	Tolkien "translates" the 4th Age manuscript into English

=== Realistic language family ===
Middle-earth Elvish and part of Indo-European language trees as understood in Tolkien's time compared. Tolkien, a philologist, was intensely interested in the evolution of language families, and modelled his fictional languages and their evolution on real ones. The language names and evolution shown for Middle-earth are as used in the Lhammas.

The Lhammas and related writings like "The Etymologies" illustrate Tolkien's conception of the languages of Middle-earth as a language family analogous to Indo-European, with diverging branches and sub-branches – though for the immortal Elves the proto-language is remembered rather than reconstructed. This "concept of increasing separation" was also employed for the Sundering of the Elves in Tolkien's legendarium. The Lhammas indicates on Tolkien's diagrams of the "Tree of Tongues" that there were at various times some thirty Elvish languages and dialects.

=== Changing views of Elvish linguistic history ===
After he had written the contemporaneous Lhammas and The Etymologies (also published in The Lost Road and Other Writings), Tolkien decided to make Sindarin the major language of the Elves in exile in Beleriand. As such, it largely replaced Noldorin; eventually Tolkien settled on the explanation that after the Noldor returned to Beleriand from Valinor, they adopted the language used by the Sindar ('Grey Elves') already settled there. The Lhammas thus represents a stage in Tolkien's development of his Elvish languages (and of the Silmarillion legendarium), documented also in The Etymologies and an essay, "The Feanorian Alphabet".

Elvish language evolution as described in the Lhammas and assumed in The Etymologies, 1937

Elvish language evolution once Tolkien had The Lord of the Rings under development, 1938 onwards. Sindarin has replaced Noldorin. The 'new' Noldorin is just the Noldor's not very distinct dialect of Quenya.

Bill Welden, writing in Arda Philology, comments that "the High-elven tongue of the Noldor", mentioned by the Tolkien figure Faramir in a draft of The Lord of the Rings, sounds, and looks from the "Tree of Tongues" in the Lhammas, as if it must be Quenya "as we would expect". But, Welden writes, it's actually "almost exactly" Sindarin, which Tolkien derived from Welsh. Further, the version of The Lord of the Rings that he submitted to his publisher relied on "pretty much" the same conception of the Elvish language family, with Noldorin instead of Sindarin as the language of Gondor. Tolkien tried several schemes to make the change to Sindarin work in terms of rates of linguistic change. Because the Noldor's use of Sindarin was rather sudden, he settled on a radically new scheme: when the Noldor arrived back in Middle-earth from Valinor, they adopted the native language of Beleriand where they settled. The Elves of Beleriand were Sindar, Silvan Elves who had never gone to Valinor. The Noldor had been speaking Noldorin, a dialect of the ancient language of Quenya, and it had changed little, unlike Sindarin. The Lhammas and The Etymologies had been describing Sindarin (but calling it Noldorin). Tolkien hastened to redraw the "Tree of Tongues", in a version recorded in Parma Eldalamberon 18, to accommodate this restructuring.

== Sources ==
- Carpenter, Humphrey (1977). J. R. R. Tolkien: A Biography. New York: Ballantine Books. ISBN 978-0-04-928037-3.
- Carpenter, Humphrey, ed. (2023) [1981]. The Letters of J. R. R. Tolkien: Revised and Expanded Edition. New York: HarperCollins. ISBN 978-0-35-865298-4.
- Fimi, Dimitra (2009). Tolkien, Race and Cultural History: From Fairies to Hobbits. Palgrave Macmillan. ISBN 978-0-2302-1951-9.
- Flieger, Verlyn (1983). Splintered Light: Logos and Language in Tolkien's World. Wm B. Eerdmans Publishing. ISBN 978-0-8028-1955-0.
- Flieger, Verlyn (2002). Splintered Light: Logos and Language in Tolkien's World (revised ed.). Kent State University Press. ISBN 978-0-8733-8744-6.
- Garth, John (2003). Tolkien and the Great War: The Threshold of Middle-earth. HarperCollins. ISBN 978-0-00711-953-0.
- Goering, Nelson (2017). "The Feanorian Alphabet, Part 1; Quenya Verb Structure by J.R.R. Tolkien". Tolkien Studies. 14 (1): 191–201. doi:10.1353/tks.2017.0015. ISSN 1547-3163.
- Shippey, Tom (2001). J. R. R. Tolkien: Author of the Century. HarperCollins. pp. 228–231. ISBN 978-0261-10401-3.
- Smith, Arden R. (2020) [2014]. "Invented Languages and Writing Systems". In Lee, Stuart D. (ed.). A Companion to J. R. R. Tolkien. Wiley Blackwell. pp. 202–214. ISBN 978-1119656029. OCLC 1183854105.
- Tolkien, J. R. R. (1987). Christopher Tolkien (ed.). The Lost Road and Other Writings. Boston: Houghton Mifflin. ISBN 0-395-45519-7.
- Tolkien, J. R. R. (1990). Christopher Tolkien (ed.). The War of the Ring. Boston: Houghton Mifflin. ISBN 0-395-56008-X.
- Welden, Bill (2023). "How We Got Sindarin". In Beregond, Anders Stenström (ed.). Arda Philology 7: Proceedings of the Seventh International Conference on JRR Tolkien's Invented Languages, Omentielva Otsea, Hayward, 10-13 August 2017. Arda. pp. 12–29. ISBN 9789197350075.
