= Helge Fauskanger =

Norwegian philologist

- Born: August 17, 1971 (age 54)
- Occupations: Author, philologist
- Known for: Tolkien studies
- Website: www.helgefauskanger.com

Helge Kåre Fauskanger (born 17 August 1971) is a Norwegian author and philologist. In Norway he is known as a crime novelist; elsewhere, he is best known as a Tolkien scholar with an interest in Tolkien's constructed languages.

== Education ==
Fauskanger has studied both philology and religious studies, and has taken courses in classical Hebrew, Greek and Coptic. His main thesis The Bible in Norwegian (1998) compares selected texts from three widespread Norwegian Bible translations. He describes himself as an agnostic and skeptic.

== Career ==
Fauskanger's satirical debut novel Fullmåne over Uroba ("Full Moon over Uroba" 2009) describes an alternative reality where a nation resembling the USA is located in Europe instead.

Fauskanger's debut as a crime writer was the crime novel Skrinet in 2012, published by Baskerville. This is a Sherlock Holmes pastiche where Holmes comes to Norway in 1895, and tracks down the lost reliquary of St. Sunniva. The novel Skarlagenssalen (Gyldendal 2013) is a sequel to Skrinet with the same first-person narrator, who in this story meets the ten-year-old Vidkun Quisling in 1897. Vidkun is with his father Jon Lauritz Qvisling on a paranormal investigation at a dark manor in Østfold. The story is a crime thriller with inspiration from John Dickson Carr. Both Skrinet and Skarlagenssalen were awarded a "die throw" of 5 by Norway's Verdens Gang newspaper.

In 2015 he published a commentary edition of The New Testament newly translated from Greek into Norwegian, observing to the annoyance of the Norwegian Bible Society that their 2011 version was more polished than the original. The translation tried to preserve illogicalities and bad language in the original Bible text. The Society commented that it was almost impossible to give the "real" text as it had mainly been presented orally and then written by people for whom Greek was not their first language; in their view Fauskanger's "polemic oozes with contempt". Fauskanger denied that he held the Bible in contempt.

=== Tolkien linguistics ===
The first few lines of a poem in Tolkien's Elvish language, Quenya
Silmesse

Sinome háran i marya silmesse;
Ilmello sílar tinwi lómesse;
Cénanten, i telpeva hendi,
ve cennente i cuivie Quendi.

"In starlight"

Here I am sitting in the pale moonlight;
from Ilmen sparks are shining in [the] night;
They see me, the silvery eyes,
as they saw the wakening Elves.

Fauskanger is known for his linguistic work on J.R.R. Tolkien's fictional world of Middle-earth. Since the early nineties, he has been a regular contributor to Angerthas, the member magazine of Norway's Tolkien Society. He started and runs the website Ardalambion, devoted to the study of Tolkien's constructed languages. The site has been called "one of the principal websites for the study of Tolkien's languages". The website has been translated from English into a number of other languages. In connection with his work with Tolkien's languages, Fauskanger has appeared in the programs Typisk Norsk ("Typically Norwegian") and Norges herligste ("Norway's Finest"). A poem he wrote in Tolkien's invented language Quenya (Silmessë, "In starlight") was set to music by Carvin Knowles and had a music video made for it. Among the topics he has published papers on are Sindarin and Black Speech. He has created a 20-lesson course on Quenya, which he states "presuppose[s] a deep and serious interest on the part of the student".

== Reception ==
The Norwegian national newspaper Aftenposten describes Fauskanger as having "an aura of 1905 about him", the year in which his book Skamtegnet is set. It calls the book at once a historical crime novel, a murder mystery, and a streak of supernatural horror. The paper's reviewer Pål Gerhard Olsen calls the book "an excellent read" with an "exquisitely elegant" plot and a masterfully constructed ending. The paper states that with his knowledge of multiple ancient languages "one can safely say that [Fauskanger] is almost unbearably scholarly".

Reviewing Fauskanger's book Skrinet, the Norwegian daily newspaper Dagsavisen writes that the novel begins from a sentence by Arthur Conan Doyle, which mentions that Sherlock Holmes visited Norway in 1895, and the last line of The Adventure of Black Peter where Holmes says that his address will be "somewhere in Norway". Asked if this was just "literary grave robbing", Fauskanger replied that the book has fun with Holmes, St Sunniva, and Jewish Kabbalah mysticism, three things that might not seem to be connected until one reads the book.

In Arda Philology, Karolina Kazimierczak writes that Fauskanger's description of Quenya in his Quenya Course could easily be read as historical musicology. She comments that his interpretation seems "[close] to Tolkien's own vision of language, music, and their interrelations."

== Works ==
- 2009 Fullmåne over Uroba (Full Moon over Uroba) – novel
- 2012 Skrinet (The Casket) – crime novel
- 2013 Skarlagenssalen (The Scarlet Hall) – crime novel
- 2015 Det nye testamente (The New Testament) – bible translation and commentary
- 2015 Skamtegnet (The Sign of Shame) – crime novel
- 2021 Skorpionbrosjen (The Scorpion Brooch) – crime novel
