= Khuzdul =

Fictional language of dwarves in J. R. R. Tolkien's Middle-earth

- Created by: J. R. R. Tolkien
- Date: c. 1935
- Setting and usage: Middle-earth, the setting of the novel The Lord of the Rings, the secret and private language of the Dwarves.
- Purpose: constructed languages: artistic languages; Khuzdul
- Writing system: Cirth
- Sources: Influenced primarily by Hebrew in phonology and morphology and other Semitic languages

Language codes
- ISO 639-3: None (mis)
- Glottolog: None

Khuzdul (pronounced [kʰuzˈdul]) is a fictional language created by J. R. R. Tolkien, one of the languages of Middle-earth, specifically the secret and private language of the Dwarves. He based its structure and phonology on Semitic languages, primarily Hebrew, with triconsonantal roots of words. Very little of its grammar is defined.

== External history ==
Tolkien began developing Khuzdul before the 1937 publication of The Hobbit, with some names appearing in early versions of The Silmarillion. Tolkien based Khuzdul on Semitic languages, primarily Hebrew, with triconsonantal roots and similarities to Hebrew's phonology and morphology. Tolkien noted some similarities between Dwarves and Jews: both were "at once natives and aliens in their habitations, speaking the languages of the country, but with an accent due to their own private tongue…". (Note: Carpenter 2023, #176) Tolkien commented of the Dwarves that "their words are Semitic obviously, constructed to be Semitic."

Although a very limited vocabulary is known, Tolkien mentioned he had developed the language to a certain extent. A small amount of material on Khuzdul phonology and root modifications has survived; it is yet to be published.

== Internal history ==
=== Secret language ===
In the fictional setting of Middle-earth, little is known of Khuzdul (once written Khuzdûl): the Dwarves kept it secret, except for place names and a few phrases such as their battle-cry and Balin's tomb inscription in Moria. These read, respectively:

The very small corpus of Khuzdul phrases
Baruk Khazâd! Khazâd ai-mênu!	"Axes of the Dwarves! The Dwarves are upon you!"
Balin Fundinul uzbad Khazad-dûmu	"Balin son of Fundin, lord of Moria"

According to the Lhammas, Khuzdul is a language isolate, the sole member of the Aulëan language family, not related to the Oromëan languages spoken by Elves (all of which are akin to Quenya). Aulëan was named from the Dwarvish tradition that it had been devised by Aulë the Smith, the Vala who created the Dwarves. Later, Tolkien dropped the origins of Elvish being taught by Oromë, but kept the origins of Khuzdul the same. It is said in The Silmarillion that Aulë created the dwarves, and taught them "the language he had devised for them", making Khuzdul, both in fiction and reality, a constructed language.

Dwarves were unwilling to teach outsiders Khuzdul, even to their non-dwarf friends. Dwarves spoke the languages of the region "but with an accent due to their own private tongue...". (Note: Carpenter 2023, #176) Dwarves were however willing to reveal the names of places in Khuzdul, such as the names of the landmarks of Moria: "I know them and their names, for under them lies Khazad-dûm, the Dwarrowdelf... Yonder stands Barazinbar, the Redhorn...and beyond him are Silvertine and Cloudyhead:...that we call Zirakzigil and Bundushathûr." (Note: Tolkien 1954a, book 2, ch. 5 "The Bridge of Khazad-dûm")

=== Iglishmêk ===
Besides their aglâb, spoken tongue, the Dwarves used a sign language, or iglishmêk, (Note: Tolkien 1994, part 4, appendix D) which was just as secret as Khuzdul. According to The War of the Jewels, Dwarves learnt it simultaneously with the aglâb from childhood. The Dwarvish sign language was much more varied between communities than Khuzdul, which remained "astonishingly uniform and unchanged both in time and in locality". Tolkien described its structure and use: "The component sign-elements of any such code were often so slight and so swift that they could hardly be detected, still less interpreted by uninitiated onlookers. As the Eldar eventually discovered in their dealings with the Naugrim, they could speak with their voices but at the same time by ‘gesture’ convey to their own folk modifications of what was being said. Or they could stand silent considering some proposition, and yet confer among themselves meanwhile."

Tolkien only gave a few examples of the Iglishmêk sign language in his unpublished notes. The command to "Listen!" involved a slight raising of both forefingers simultaneously. The acknowledgment "I am listening" involved a slight raising of the right-hand forefinger, followed by a similar raising of the left-hand forefinger.

== Phonology ==
The following phonemes are attested in Tolkien's Khuzdul vocabulary.

	Labial	Alveolar	Postalveolar	Palatal	Velar	Uvular	Glottal
Plosive	b	t d			k ɡ		ʔ^{1}
Aspirated plosive		tʰ			kʰ (ɡʰ)^{2}		
Fricative	f	s z	ʃ		(ɣ)^{2}		h
Nasal	m	n					
Trill		(r) ^{3}				ʀ ^{3}	
Approximant		l		j			

	Front	Central	Back
Close	i iː		u uː
Close-mid	e eː	ə^{4}	o oː
Open-mid			ʌ^{4}
Open		a aː	

Only one diphthong is attested in Khuzdul: ai [ai], as seen in ai-mênu.

^{1} Often at the start of words that begin with a vowel, often not written in the Latin alphabet, but has its own rune in Angerthas Moria.
^{2} Supposedly in Azaghâl, 'gh' [ɣ] is used to represent this sound in Black Speech and Orcish, but was not said of Khuzdul. Could also be [ɡh] or [ɡʰ].
^{3} Alveolar trill [r] a later variant in pronunciation, the uvular trill [ʀ] being the original Khuzdul pronunciation.
^{4} No examples, but Tolkien explicitly states that these were frequent in Khuzdul, and had their own Cirth runes. Possibly in between incompatible consonant formations or current vowels in known corpus.

Khuzdul features a CV(C(C)) syllable structure. Words that begin with a vowel or diphthong have a glottal stop at the beginning to fill the place of an initial consonant. Words can not start with a consonant cluster, but these are found in medial or final positions in a word. The language was said to be "cumbrous and unlovely" to the elves; (Note: Tolkien 1977, ch. 10 "Of the Sindar") Tolkien described it as having a cacophonous quality.

== Writing ==
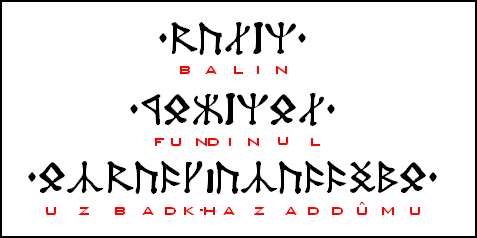
Khuzdul written in Cirth runes in Angerthas Moria style on Balin's tomb, reading Balin Fundinul Uzbad Khazaddûmu, "Balin son of Fundin Lord of Moria"

Tolkien mostly wrote Khuzdul in the Latin alphabet, and in Cirth within Middle-earth. The dwarves had adopted the Cirth from the elves by the end of the first age, and made changes to their liking to represent the sounds of Khuzdul. There were two methods known of writing Khuzdul, Angerthas Moria when the dwarves still lived in Khazad-dûm before its fall, and Angerthas Erebor once they fled and further developed the Cirth when they settled at Erebor, The Lonely Mountain. (Note: Tolkien 1955, Appendix E)

== Grammar ==
Too little is known of Khuzdul grammar even to construct a sentence. Tolkien states that Khuzdul was complicated and unlike the other languages of Middle-earth at the time in its phonology and grammar. It has been said that its grammar influenced the basic grammar of Adûnaic, but little material is given to show these influences other than the mention of where Adûnaic's grammar differs from Quenya.

=== Nouns and adjectives ===
Nouns and adjectives had singular and plural forms and, like the Semitic languages, can be in the absolute or construct state. The construct state indicates a connection with the following noun, being a quality, belonging or part of that noun. The construct comes before the absolute noun e.g.: Baruk Khazâd! 'Axes + Dwarves' "Axes of the Dwarves" the axes belong to the dwarves, Khazad-dûm 'Dwarves + Delving' "Dwarrowdelf", a Dwarvish delving. Khuzdul appears to have case endings with nominative and accusative/genitive cases, and perhaps an adjectival suffix.

Title
Nominative	Accusative/genitive	Nisba
-ø	-u	-ul
Khuzd	Khuzdu	Khuzdul
Khazad-dûm	Khazad-dûmu	Khuzdul

Nouns and adjectives may have had different declensions for formation and number. Tolkien stated plural formations were similar to Arabic's broken plurals, which would make for many irregular plurals; two examples are known: baruk, the plural of bark "axe", and Khazâd, the plural of Khuzdul.

1st declension
Template		Sg.	Pl.	
Template		Abs. & Const.	Abs.	Const.
Root	Meaning	CuCC	CaCâC	CaCaC
√KhZD	Dwarf	Khuzd	Khazâd	Khazad
√RKhS	Orc	Rukhs	Rakhâs	Rakhas

Other noun declension types likely existed, but little detail is provided to show any full declensions or identify any broken plurals. The only hints that point to their existence is in compounded attested words and single words:

Known noun and adjective forms
Absolute				Construct / composition			
Singular
Root		Pattern	Word	Root		Pattern	Word
√BRK	Axe	CaCC	Bark	√NRG	Black	CaCC	Narg-
√NLʔ	River-course	CâCaC	Nâla’	√ThRK	Staff	CaCC	Thark-
√ZRM	Pool, lake	CâCaC	Zâram	√BRZ	Red	CaCaC	Baraz
√NRG	Black	CaCâC	Narâg	√NRG	Black	CaCaC	Narag
√GThL	Fortress	CaCoC	Gathol	√ZHR	Hollow	CaCaC	Zahar
√FLK	Hewer	CeCaC	Felak	√GBL	Great in size	CaCiC	Gabil
√ZRK	Spike, tine, peak	CiCaC	Zirak	√KhLD	Glass, mirror	CeCeC	Kheled
√NBR	Horn	‘iCCaC	‘inbar	√KBL	Silver (metal)	CiCiC	Kibil
√KhZD	Dwarf	CuCC	Khuzd	√DBN	Valley	CuCaC	Duban
√TM(M) / √DM(M)	Hall	CûC	Tûm / dûm	√ZBD	Lord, ruler	‘uCCaC	‘uzbad
Plural
Root		Pattern	Word	Root		Pattern	Word
√RKhS	Orc, goblin	CaCâC	Rakhâs	√ʔZN	Shadow / dim	CaCaC	‘azan
√BRK	Axe	CaCuC	Baruk	√KhZD	Dwarf	CaCaC	Khazad
√ShThR	Cloud	CaCûC	Shathûr	√BRK	Axe	CaCuC	Baruk
√ShMK	Gesture	‘iCCêC	‘ishmêk	√SGN	Long	CiCiC	Sigin

The word baruk is both the absolute and construct plural form of bark, likely the result of being a broken plural.

Collective nouns
	Root template		Root: √BZ(Z)		Hall: √TM(M)	
Number	Collective	Singulative	Collective	Singulative	Collective	Singulative
Absolute	CûC	CuCûn	Bûz*	Buzûn*	Tûm*	Tumûn*
Construct	CuC	CuCun	Buz*	Buzun	Tum*	Tumun

In compound words, the adjective usually precedes the noun, as in sigin-tarâg, "longbeards".

Compounded nouns
Adj. + noun	Barazinbar; Redhorn	Baraz; Red	Inbar; Horn
Adj. + noun	Kibil-nâla; Silverlode	Kibil; Silver (metal)	Nâla; River-course
Adj. + noun	Kheled-zâram; Mirrormere	Kheled; Mirror	Zâram; Lake
Adj. + noun	Sigin-tarâg; Longbeards	Sigin; Long	Tarâg; Beards
Noun + adj.	Zirakzigil; Silvertine	Zirak; Spike, tine	Zigil; Silver (colour)
Noun-prep./acc. + adj.	Bundushathûr; Cloudyhead	Bund-u; Head (in/of/acc.)	Shathûr; Clouds
Verbal noun	Felak-gundu; Cave-hewer	Felak; Hewer	Gund-u; Cave (acc.)

=== Verbs ===
Only four verb words are known. The exact tense or use of these verbs is unknown:

Felak : to use a tool like a broad-bladed chisel, or small axe-head without haft.
Felek: to hew rock.
Gunud : to delve underground, excavate, tunnel.
√S-L-N, Sulûn, Salôn : to fall or descend swiftly.

== Lexicon ==
=== Placenames and names ===
Khuzdul proper names analysed by Helge Fauskanger
Khuzdul names	Translation	Khuzdul names	Translation
Azaghâl	A lord of the Belegost Dwarves in The Silmarillion, ch. 20	Mahal	Aulë, known to the dwarves as the Maker.
Azanulbizar	'Dimrill Dale' lit: "Shadows of streams/rills" or "Dark stream dale".	Mîm	A Petty-Dwarf, possibly an 'inner name'.
Barazinbar	'Redhorn' (Caradhras), also shortened to Baraz 'Red'.	Narag-zâram	'Black-lake', early name, Mirrormere?
Bundushathûr	'Cloudyhead', also shortened to Shathûr 'Clouds'.	Nargûn	Mordor, and Sauron, lit: "Black one/place".
Buzundush	'Blackroot', earlier name of the Silverlode.	Nar(u)kuthûn	Nargothrond, possible later name.
Felakgundu	Cave-hewer; epessë of Finrod. Origin of Felagund.	Nulukkhizdîn	Nargothrond, the Petty-Dwarvish name
Gabilân	'Great River'. a portion of the river Gelion	Sigin-tarâg	The Longbeards, the house of Durin.
Gabilgathol	'Great Fortress' (Belegost).	Sharbhund	Amon Rûdh, possibly meaning 'Bald Hill' as is in Sindarin.
Gamil Zirak	'Old Spike', Nickname of a Firebeard smith.	Tharkûn	Gandalf, said to mean 'Staff-man'.
Gundabad	Mount Gundabad.	Tumunzahar	'Hollowbold' (Nogrod).
Ibun	A Petty-Dwarf, possibly an 'inner name'.	Udushinbar	Earlier name of Bundushathûr.
Kibil-nâla	The name of the Silverlode.	Uruktharbun	Earlier name of Khazad-dûm or Azanulbizar, meaning unknown.
Khazad-dûm	Dwarf-mansion, Dwarrowdelf' (later known as Moria).	Zigil-nâd	earlier name of the Silverlode.
Kheled-zâram	'glass-lake', i.e. Mirrormere.	Zirakinbar	'Silverhorn', earlier name of Zirakzigil.
Khîm	A Petty-Dwarf, possibly an 'inner name'.	Zirakzigil	'Silvertine' (Celebdil), also shortened to Zirak 'Spike'.

=== Words ===
Khuzdul words analysed by Helge Fauskanger
Khuzdul	Meaning	Khuzdul	Meaning
-âb / -b	abstract collective?	kheled	glass, mirror
‘aglâb	spoken language	Khuzd / Khazâd	Dwarf / Dwarves
‘aya, ‘ai-	upon	Khuzdul	Dwarvish language, lit. "Dwarf-of(gen.)"
‘azan	dark, dim	kibil	silver, the metal
‘iglishmêk	sign-language of the Dwarves	ma-	passive participle?
‘inbar	horn	mazarb	written documents, records
‘ûl	streams	mazarbul	records (the Chamber of Mazarbul, Book of Mazarbul)
‘uzbad	lord	mên* / mênu	2nd person plural, "you" - Nom.* / Acc.
‘uzn	dimness, shadow	-n / -ân / -în / -ûn	one, person or place.
baraz	red	nâla’	path, course, river-course or bed
bark / baruk	axe / axes	narâg	black
bizar / bizâr?	dale or valley	Rukhs / Rakhâs	Orc / Orcs
bund	head	sigin	long
buz / bûz	root?	sulûn / salôn	fall, descend swiftly
duban	valley	sharb	bald?
dûm / tûm^{1}	delving, subterranean mansion, hall	shathûr	clouds
dush / dûsh?	black, dark?	tum / tûm	hall / delving^{1}
felak	tool for cutting stone	thark / tharuk*	staff / staffs*
felek	hew rock	turg* / tarâg	beard / beards
gabil	great	-u	of / accusative marker
gamil	old?	-ul	of, patronymic genitive ending
gathol	fortress	zahar	hollow?
gund	underground hall	zâram	pool, lake
gunud	delve underground, excavate, tunnel	zigil	silver, the colour
hund	hill?	zirak	spike

^{1} Seen in Tumunzahar in 'Hollowbold', with 'bold' as an obsolete term for dwelling. Assimilates to 'D' when precedes one, e.g. d-t = d-d : Khazad-dûm

=== Consonantal roots ===
Khuzdul's word stems are as in the Semitic languages not full words but groups of consonants, most often in threes.

Biconsonant roots
Khuzdul root	Translation	Khuzdul root	Translation
√ʔL	streams	√HL	??? - Azaghâl
√DM	excavation, hall, mansion	√ND	see √NLʔ - Zigil-nâd
√DSh	dark, darkness	√TM	excavation, hall, mansion

Triconsonant roots
√ʔBD	??? - Gundabad	√MHL	Create, Maker?
√ʔGL	speech, language, dialect	√NBR	horn
√ʔRK	??? - Uruktharbun	√NDD	see √NLʔ - Zigil-nâd
√ʔZG	??? - Azaghâl	√NLʔ	path, course, river-course or bed
√ʔZN	dimness, shadow	√NRG	black
√BND	head	√RKhS	Orc, Goblin
√BRK	axe	√SGN	long
√BRZ	red	√SLN	fall, descend swiftly
√BZR	dale, valley	√ShMK	gesture, hand, sign?
√BZZ	root (of a plant)	√ShRB	bald?
√DBN	valley	√ShThR	cloud
√DMM	excavation, hall, mansion	√TMM	excavation, hall, mansion
√FLK	hew, hewer	√TRG	beard
√GBL	great in size	√ThRB	??? - Uruktharbun
√GML	old, great in age?	√ThRK	staff (rod)
√GND	cave, tunnel	√ZBD	lord
√GThL	fortress	√ZGL	silver (colour)
√HND	hill?	√ZHR	hollow?
√KBL	silver (metal)	√ZRB	write, inscribe
√KhLD	glass, mirror	√ZRK	spike
√KhZD	Dwarf	√ZRM	pool, lake
