= Languages constructed by Tolkien =

Constructed languages

The English philologist and author J. R. R. Tolkien created several constructed languages, mostly related to his fictional world of Middle-earth. Inventing languages, something that he called glossopoeia (paralleling his idea of mythopoeia or myth-making), was a lifelong occupation for Tolkien, starting in his teens.

Tolkien's glossopoeia has two temporal dimensions: the internal (fictional) timeline of events in Middle-earth described in The Silmarillion and other writings, and the external timeline of Tolkien's own life during which he often revised and refined his languages and their fictional history. Tolkien scholars have published a substantial volume of Tolkien's linguistic material in the History of Middle-earth books, and the Vinyar Tengwar and Parma Eldalamberon journals. Scholars such as Carl F. Hostetter, David Salo and Elizabeth Solopova have published grammars and studies of the languages.

He created a large family of Elvish languages, the best-known and most developed being Quenya and Sindarin. In addition, he sketched in the Mannish languages of Adûnaic and Rohirric; the Dwarvish language of Khuzdul; the Entish language; and the Black Speech, in the fiction a constructed language enforced on the Orcs by the Dark Lord Sauron. Tolkien supplemented his languages with several scripts.

== Context ==
=== Tolkien's hobby: glossopoeia ===
Tolkien was a professional philologist of ancient Germanic languages, specialising in Old English. Glossopoeia, the construction of languages, was Tolkien's hobby for most of his life.

One of the first constructed languages Tolkien encountered was "Animalic", invented by his cousins Mary and Marjorie Incledon. The language mainly used animal names, for example "Dog nightingale woodpecker forty" translated to "You are an ass". Tolkien's name in Animalic was "Otter". He learned a bit of it, but was not fluent in Animalic. Together with Mary, Tolkien invented Nevbosh, a sound substitution cypher known, (Note: Tolkien 1983, p. 200) 'new nonsense', based on English with French and Latin borrowings, which grew to include some elements of actual invented language. Tolkien stated that this was not his first effort in invented languages. (Note: Tolkien 1983, p. 203) Shortly thereafter, he developed a true invented language called Naffarin, (Note: Tolkien 1983, p. 209) which used Latin and Spanish elements. One of his early projects was the reconstruction of an unrecorded early Germanic language which might have been spoken by the people of Beowulf in the Germanic Heroic Age.

Tolkien was well aware of Esperanto, from c. 1907-1911, when he used it in one of his notebooks. In 1931, he gave a lecture about his passion for constructed languages, titled A Secret Vice. Here he contrasts his project of artistic languages constructed for aesthetic pleasure with the pragmatism of international auxiliary languages. In Secret Vice, he noted that he "particularly like Esperanto, not least because it is the creation ultimately of one man, not a philologist, and is therefore something like a 'human language bereft of the inconveniences due to too many successive cooks' - which is as good a description of the ideal artificial language (in a particular sense) as I can give." The lecture also discusses Tolkien's views on phonaesthetics, citing Greek, Finnish, and Welsh as examples of "languages which have a very characteristic and in their different ways beautiful word-form". (Note: Tolkien 1983, "A Secret Vice") Part of the lecture was published in The Monsters and the Critics, and Other Essays; in the part that was not, Tolkien gave the example of "Fonwegian", a language with "no connection whatever with any other known language". (Note: All the same, Fonwegian contained words like agroul for "field", cf. Greek ᾰ̓γρός (agrós), and nausi for "sailor", cf. Greek ναύτης (naútēs), which do "suggest derivative origin".)

In 1932, Tolkien became a member of the Board of Honorary Advisers to the Education Committee of the British Esperanto Association, even though he was not an active Esperantist and admitted himself that he did not speak or read Esperanto, but only learned its grammar 25 years ago. Nevertheless, Tolkien wrote an article for the British Esperantist, titled "A Philologist on Esperanto". There, while writing positively about Esperanto, he criticized another constructed language, Novial, describing it as "hideous", a "factory product ... made of spare parts".

The latest mention of Esperanto by Tolkien was in a 1956 letter; he became much more critical of universal constructed languages, writing that:

Volapuk, Esperanto, Ido, Novial, &c. &c. are dead, far deader than ancient unused languages, because their authors never invented any Esperanto legends.

Being a skilled calligrapher, Tolkien invented scripts for his languages. The scripts included Sarati, Cirth, and Tengwar.

=== Tolkien's theory of invented languages ===
Tolkien was of the opinion that the invention of an artistic language in order to be convincing and pleasing must include not only the language's historical development, but also the history of its speakers, and especially the mythology associated with both the language and the speakers. It was this idea that an "Elvish language" must be associated with a complex history and mythology of the Elves that was at the core of the development of Tolkien's legendarium.

Tolkien wrote in one of his letters:

what I think is a primary 'fact' about my work, that it is all of a piece, and fundamentally linguistic in inspiration. ... It is not a 'hobby', in the sense of something quite different from one's work, taken up as a relief-outlet. The invention of languages is the foundation. The 'stories' were made rather to provide a world for the languages than the reverse. To me a name comes first and the story follows. I should have preferred to write in 'Elvish'. But, of course, such a work as The Lord of the Rings has been edited and only as much 'language' has been left in as I thought would be stomached by readers. (I now find that many would have liked more.) ... It is to me, anyway, largely an essay in 'linguistic aesthetic', as I sometimes say to people who ask me 'what is it all about'. (Note: Carpenter 2023, #165 to the Houghton Mifflin Co., 30 June 1955)

The Tolkien scholar and folklorist Dimitra Fimi questions this claim. In particular, his September 1914 The Voyage of Earendel the Evening Star, based on the Old English poem Crist 1, shows that he was starting to think about a mythology before he started to sketch his first invented Middle-earth language, Qenya, in March 1915. Further, the steps that led to his first attempt at the mythology, (Note: Fimi notes that this process was analysed by John Garth in his 2003 biography Tolkien and the Great War.) the 1917 draft of The Book of Lost Tales, involving the character of Earendel in its first story, did not involve his invented languages. Tolkien was, rather, in Fimi's view, emphasizing that language and myth "began to flow together when I was an undergraduate [at Oxford, 1911–1915]" (as Tolkien wrote in 1954), (Note: Carpenter 2023, #144 to Naomi Mitchison, 25 April 1954) and stayed that way for the rest of his life.

=== Lhammas ===
In 1937, Tolkien wrote the Lhammas, a linguistic treatise addressing the relationships of the languages spoken in Middle-earth during the First Age, principally the Elvish languages. The text purports to be a translation of an Elvish work, written by one Pengolodh, whose historical works are presented as being the main source of the narratives in The Silmarillion concerning the First Age.

The Lhammas exists in three versions, the shortest one being called the Lammasathen. (Note: These are published, as edited by Christopher Tolkien, in The Lost Road and Other Writings.) The main linguistic thesis in this text is that the languages of Middle-earth are all descended from the language of the Valar (the "gods"), Valarin, and divided into three branches:

- Oromëan, named after Oromë, who taught the first Elves to speak. All languages of Elves and most languages of Men are Oromëan.
- Aulëan, named after Aulë, maker of the Dwarves, is the origin of the Khuzdul language. It has had some influences on the tongues of Men.
- Melkian, named after the rebellious Melkor or Morgoth, is the origin in the First Age of the many tongues used by the Orcs and other evil beings.

== Middle-earth languages ==
=== Elvish ===
==== Internal and external histories ====
The internal history of Elvish Languages mapped to kindreds and migrations in the Sundering of the Elves. Quenya was the ancient language; Sindarin was initially spoken in Beleriand, and continued to be spoken in Middle-earth in the Third Age. Beneath the name of each language is the word for "Elves" in that language.

Internally, in the fiction, the Elvish language family is a group of languages related by descent from a common ancestor, called the proto-language.

Externally, in Tolkien's life, he constructed the family from around 1910, working on it up to his death in 1973. He constructed the grammar and vocabulary of at least fifteen languages and dialects in roughly three periods:

1. Early, 1910 – c. 1930: most of the proto-language Primitive Quendian, Common Eldarin, Quenya, and Goldogrin
2. Mid: c. 1935–1955: Goldogrin changed into Noldorin, joined by Telerin, Ilkorin, Doriathrin and Avarin
3. Late: Ilkorin and Doriathrin disappeared; Noldorin matured into Sindarin.

Tolkien worked out much of the etymological background of his Elvish languages during the 1930s, resulting in The Etymologies. (Note: Tolkien 1987, pp. 378–379)

Etymology of 'Glamdring' in Tolkien's Elvish languages, as described in The Etymologies under "Lam-", "Khoth-", "Glam-", and "Dring-" (Note: Tolkien 1987, pp. 385–448 "The Etymologies") What was Noldorin at that time later became Sindarin.

==== Quenya ====
Tolkien based Quenya pronunciation more on Latin than on Finnish, though it has elements derived from both languages. Thus, Quenya lacks the vowel harmony and consonant gradation present in Finnish, and accent is not always on the first syllable of a word. Typical Finnish elements like the front vowels ö, ä and y are lacking in Quenya, but phonological similarities include the absence of aspirated unvoiced stops or the development of the syllables ti > si in both languages. The combination of a Latin basis with Finnish phonological rules resulted in a product that resembles Italian in many respects, which was Tolkien's favourite modern Romance language. (Note: Carpenter 2023, #223: "I remain in love with Italian, and feel quite lorn without a chance of trying to speak it.")

Quenya grammar is agglutinative and mostly suffixing, i.e. different word particles are joined by appending them. It has basic word classes of verbs, nouns and pronouns/determiners, adjectives and prepositions. Nouns are inflected for case and number. Verbs are inflected for tense and aspect, and for agreement with subject and object. In early Quenya, adjectives agree with the noun they modify in case and number; in later Quenya, this agreement disappears. The basic word order is subject–verb–object.

==== Sindarin ====
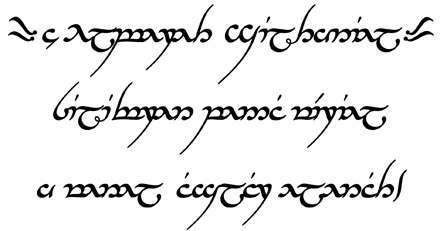

A Elbereth Gilthoniel
silivren penna míriel
o menel aglar elenath!

Start of the Sindarin poem
"A Elbereth Gilthoniel"

Tolkien wrote that he gave Sindarin "a linguistic character very like (though not identical with) British-Welsh ... because it seems to fit the rather 'Celtic' type of legends and stories told of its speakers". (Note: Carpenter 2023, #144 to Naomi Mitchison, April 1954)

Unlike Quenya, Sindarin is mainly a fusional language with some analytic tendencies. It can be distinguished from Quenya by the rarity of vowel endings, and the use of voiced plosives b d g, which are rare in Quenya and found only after nasals and liquids. Early Sindarin formed plurals by the addition of -ī, which vanished but affected the preceding vowels (as in Welsh and Old English): S. Adan, pl. Edain, S. Orch, pl. Yrch. Sindarin forms plurals in multiple ways.

=== Mannish ===
==== Adûnaic and Westron ====
Tolkien devised Adûnaic (or Númenórean), the language spoken in Númenor, shortly after World War II, and thus at about the time he completed The Lord of the Rings, but before he wrote the linguistic background of the Appendices. Adûnaic is intended as the language from which Westron (also called Adûni) is derived; Westron became the lingua franca for all the peoples of Middle-earth: This added a depth of historical development to the Mannish languages. Adûnaic was intended to have a "faintly Semitic flavour". Its development began with The Notion Club Papers (written in 1945). It is there that the most extensive sample of the language is found, revealed to one of the (modern-day) protagonists, Lowdham, of that story in a visionary dream of Atlantis. Its grammar is sketched in the unfinished "Lowdham's Report on the Adunaic Language". (Note: Tolkien 1992, Part Two: "The Notion Club Papers")

Tolkien remained undecided whether the language of the Men of Númenor should be derived from the original Mannish language (as in Adûnaic), or if it should be derived from "the Elvish Noldorin" (i.e. Quenya) instead. In The Lost Road and Other Writings, it is implied that the Númenóreans spoke Quenya, and that Sauron, hating all things Elvish, taught the Númenóreans the old Mannish tongue they themselves had forgotten. (Note: Tolkien 1987, p. 68 and note p. 75.)

==== Rohirric ====
Tolkien called the language of Rohan "Rohanese". He only gave a few actual Rohirric words:

- Kûd-dûkan, an old word meaning "hole-dweller", which evolved to kuduk, the name the Hobbits had for themselves
- Lô- / loh- corresponding to Old English éoh, "war-horse", and the derived names Lôgrad for "Horse-Mark", and Lohtûr for Éothéod, "horse-people". This word is an exact homonym of the Hungarian word for "horse", ló. The Rohirric word for "horse" has been identified as a cognate for Tolkien's Elvish words for "horse": rocco (Quenya) and roch (Sindarin). All names beginning with Éo- supposedly represent Rohirric names beginning with Lô- or Loh-, but the Rohirric forms of names such as Éomer and Éowyn are not given.

Horses for the Riders of Rohan
Language	Word	Comments
Rohirric	lô-	e.g. Lôgrad, "Horse-mark"
Hungarian	ló	Homonym of the Rohirric
Old English	éoh	"war-horse", hence Éothéod, "Horse-people"
Quenya	rocco	"horse"
Sindarin	roch	hence, Rohirrim, "Horse-people"

Only one proper name is given, Tûrac, an old word for King, the Rohirric for Théoden. That in turn is the Old English word þéoden, meaning "leader of a people", "king" or "prince". (Note: Bosworth, þéoden; (also spelt ðeoden), cognate to the Old Norse word þjóðann.) As with other descriptive names in his legendarium, Tolkien uses this name to create the impression that the text is "'historical', 'real' or 'archaic'".

=== Dwarvish ===
==== Khuzdul ====
Some samples of Khuzdul, the language of the Dwarves, are given in The Lord of the Rings. The explanation here is a little different from the "Mannish" languages: as Khuzdul was supposedly kept secret by the Dwarves and never used in the presence of outsiders (not even Dwarvish given names), it was not "translated" by any real-life historical language, and such limited examples as there are in the text are given in the "original". Khuzdul was designed to resemble a Semitic language, with a system of triconsonantal roots and other parallels especially to Hebrew, just as some resemblances between the Dwarves and the Jews are intentional. (Note: Carpenter 2023, #176 to Naomi Mitchison, 8 December 1955)

=== Entish ===
The language of the Ents is briefly described in The Lord of the Rings. As the Ents were first taught to speak by Elves, Entish appears related to the Elvish languages. However, the Ents continued to develop their language. It is described as long and sonorous, a tonal language somewhat like a woodwind instrument. Only the Ents spoke Entish as no others could master it. Even the Elves, master linguists, could not learn Entish, nor did they attempt to record it because of its complex sound structure: (Note: Tolkien 1955, Appendix F)

... slow, sonorous, agglomerated, repetitive, indeed long-winded; formed of a multiplicity of vowel-shades and distinctions of tone and quantity which even the loremasters of the Eldar had not attempted to represent in writing

To illustrate these properties, Tolkien provides the word a-lalla-lalla-rumba-kamanda-lindor-burúme, meaning hill. He described it as a "probably very inaccurate" sampling of the language.

=== Black Speech ===
Tolkien devised little of the Black Speech beyond the Rhyme of the Rings. He intentionally made it sound harsh but with a proper grammar. He stated that it was an agglutinative language; it has been likened to the extinct Hurrian language of northern Mesopotamia.

In the fiction, the Black Speech was created by the Dark Lord Sauron to be the official language of all the lands and peoples under his control: it was thus both in reality and in the fiction a constructed language. The Orcs are said never to have accepted it willingly; the language mutated into many mutually unintelligible Orkish dialects, so that Orcs communicated with each other mainly in a debased Westron.

== Analysis ==
=== Origins ===
Tolkien developed a particular love for the Finnish language. He described the finding of a Finnish grammar book as "like discovering a complete wine-cellar filled with bottles of an amazing wine of a kind and flavour never tasted before". (Note: Carpenter 2023, #163 to W. H. Auden, 7 June 1953.) Finnish morphology, particularly its rich system of inflection, in part gave rise to Quenya. Another of Tolkien's favourites was Welsh, and features of Welsh phonology found their way into Sindarin.

=== Linguistic mapping ===
According to Tom Shippey, Tolkien invented parts of Middle-earth to resolve the linguistic puzzle he had accidentally created by using three different pseudo-translated European languages for those of peoples in his legendarium.

When writing The Lord of the Rings (1954–55), a sequel to The Hobbit (1937), Tolkien came up with the literary device of using real languages to "translate" fictional languages. He pretended to have translated the original language Westron (named Adûni in Westron) or Common Speech (Sôval Phârë, in Westron) into English. This device of rendering an imaginary language with a real one was carried further by rendering:

- Rohirric, the language of Rohan (related to Westron) by the Mercian dialect of Old English
- names in the tongue of Dale by Old Norse forms
- names of the Kingdom of Rhovanion by Gothic forms, thus mapping the genetic relation of his fictional languages on to the existing historical relations of the Germanic languages.

Furthermore, to parallel the Celtic substratum in England, he used Old Welsh names to render the Dunlendish names of Buckland Hobbits (e.g., Meriadoc for Kalimac). The whole device of linguistic mapping was essentially a fix for the problems Tolkien had created for himself by using real Norse names for the Dwarves in The Hobbit, rather than inventing new names in Khuzdul. This seemed a clever solution, as it allowed him to explain the book's use of Modern English as representing Westron. Because of this, Tolkien did not need to work out the details of Westron grammar or vocabulary in any detail. He does give some examples of Westron words in Appendix F to The Lord of the Rings, where he summarizes Westron's origin and role as lingua franca in Middle-earth:

The language represented in this history by English was the Westron or 'Common Speech' of the West-lands of Middle-earth in the Third Age. In the course of that age it had become the native language of nearly all the speaking-peoples (save the Elves) who dwelt within the bounds of the old kingdoms of Arnor and Gondor ... At the time of the War of the Ring at the end of the age these were still its bounds as a native tongue. (Appendix F)

Rohirric is represented in The Lord of the Rings by Old English because Tolkien chose to make the relationship between Rohirric and the Common Speech similar to that of Old English and Modern English.

The mapping of Old English to Modern English is like the mapping of Rohirric to Westron, and Tolkien uses the two Germanic languages to represent the two Middle-earth languages. Further, Tolkien uses Gothic names for the early leaders of the Northmen of Rhovanion, ancestors of Rohan. (Note: Tolkien 1980, p. 311)

Tolkien stated in The Two Towers that the name Orthanc had "by design or chance" two meanings. In Sindarin it meant "Mount Fang", while in the language of Rohan he said it meant "Cunning Mind". The author Robert Foster notes that orþanc genuinely does mean "cunning" in Old English, so that the homonym Tolkien had in mind was between Sindarin and Old English, that is, translated or represented Rohirric. Foster comments that since it would be unlikely for a homonym also to exist between these two languages and actual Rohirric, and for the Old English and the Rohirric to be synonyms as well, Tolkien had made an error.

== Study ==
The first published monograph dedicated to the Elvish languages was An Introduction to Elvish (1978) edited by Jim Allan (published by Bran's Head Books). It is composed of articles written before the publication of The Silmarillion. Ruth Noel wrote a book on Middle-earth's languages in 1980.

With the publication of much linguistic material during the 1990s, especially in the History of Middle-earth series, and the Vinyar Tengwar and Parma Eldalamberon material published during the early 2000s from among the 3000 pages of linguistic material held by the team of editors including Carl F. Hostetter, Tolkien's constructed languages have become much more accessible.

David Salo's 2007 A Gateway to Sindarin presents Sindarin's grammar concisely. Elizabeth Solopova's 2009 Languages, Myth and History gives an overview of the linguistic traits of the various languages invented by Tolkien and the history of their creation.

A few fanzines were dedicated to the subject, like Tyalië Tyelelliéva published by Lisa Star, and Quettar, the Bulletin of the Linguistic Fellowship of The Tolkien Society, published by Julian C. Bradfield. Tengwestië is an online publication of the Elvish Linguistic Fellowship. Internet mailing lists and forums that have been dedicated to Tolkien's constructed languages include Tolklang, Elfling and Lambengolmor. Since 2005, there has been an International Conference on J.R.R. Tolkien's Invented Languages.

== See also ==
- Translating The Lord of the Rings
