= Morgoth =

Fictional character in Tolkien's legendarium

- Tolkien character
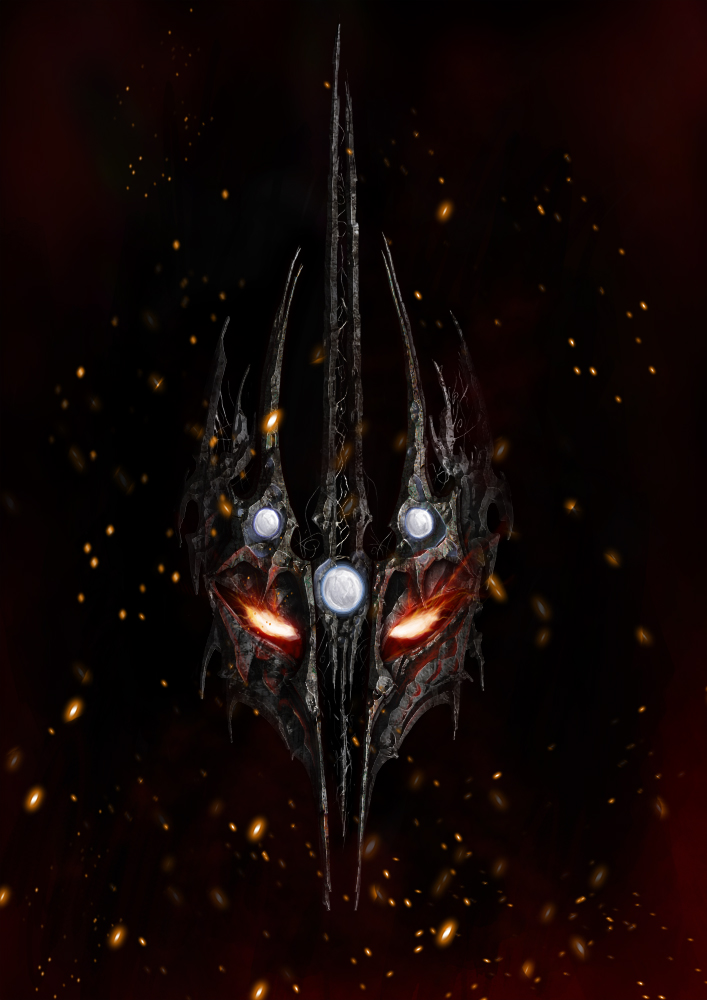
- Depiction of Morgoth wearing his Iron Crown, set with the three Silmarils stolen from Fëanor.

In-universe information
- Aliases: Melkor (originally); Arun (in the old tales of the Númenóreans); Moringotto; Bauglir
- Race: Valar
- Gender: Male
- Titles: Lord of the Dark; Dark Power of the North; Black Hand; Great Enemy
- Weapon: Grond (a mace)
- Book(s): The Lord of the Rings; The Silmarillion; The Children of Húrin; Beren and Lúthien; The Fall of Gondolin; Morgoth's Ring

Morgoth Bauglir ([ˈmɔrɡɔθ ˈbau̯ɡlir]; originally Melkor [ˈmɛlkor]) is the primary antagonist of Tolkien's legendarium, the mythic epic by the English author J. R. R. Tolkien and published in parts as The Silmarillion, The Children of Húrin, Beren and Lúthien, and The Fall of Gondolin. He is briefly mentioned in The Lord of the Rings.

Melkor is the most powerful of the godlike Valar, but he turns to darkness and is renamed Morgoth, meaning 'Black foe', by the elf Fëanor. Until the end of the First Age, he remained the primary antagonist of Arda. All evil in the world of Middle-earth stems from him, ultimately a result of the discord he introduced into the music of creation, the Ainulindalë. One of the Maiar, previously an assistant of the Vala Aulë, was corrupted by Melkor, becoming his highest-ranking lieutenant and eventually his successor, Sauron.

Melkor has often been interpreted as analogous to Satan, once the greatest of all God's angels, Lucifer, but fallen through pride and rebelling against his creator. Morgoth has likewise been likened to John Milton's characterization of Satan as a fallen angel in Paradise Lost. Tom Shippey has written that The Silmarillion maps the Book of Genesis with its creation and its fall, even Melkor having begun with good intentions. Marjorie Burns has commented that Tolkien used the Norse god Odin to create aspects of several characters, the wizard Gandalf getting some of his good characteristics, while Morgoth gets his destructiveness, malevolence, and deceit. Verlyn Flieger writes that the central temptation is the desire to possess, something that ironically afflicts two of the greatest figures in the legendarium, Melkor and Fëanor.

== Name ==
The name Morgoth is Sindarin (one of Tolkien's invented languages) and means "Dark Enemy" or "Black Foe". (Note: Tolkien 1993, pp. 194, 294) Bauglir is also Sindarin, meaning "Tyrant" or "Oppressor". (Note: Tolkien 1987, "The Etymologies") "Morgoth Bauglir" is thus an epithet. His name in the Ainulindalë (the creation myth of Middle-earth and first section of The Silmarillion) is Melkor, which means "He Who Arises in Might" in Quenya, another of Tolkien's fictional languages. (Note: Tolkien 1977, Index entry for "Melkor") This too is an epithet, since he, like all the Valar, had another true name in Valarin (in the legendarium, the language of the Valar before the beginning of Time), but this name is not recorded. The Sindarin equivalent of Melkor is Belegûr, but it is never used; instead, a deliberately similar name, Belegurth, meaning "Great Death", is employed. (Note: Tolkien 1996 p. 358) Another form of his name is Melko, simply meaning "Mighty One".

Like Sauron, he has a host of other titles: Lord of the Dark, the Dark Power of the North, the Black Hand, and Great Enemy. The Edain, the Men of Númenor, call him the Dark King and the Dark Power; the Númenóreans corrupted by Sauron call him the Lord of All and the Giver of Freedom. He is called "Master of Lies" by one of the Edain, Amlach. (Note: Tolkien 1977, ch. 17 "Of the Coming of Men into the West")

Melkor is renamed "Morgoth" when he destroys the Two Trees of Valinor, murders Finwë, the High King of the Noldor Elves, and steals the Silmarils in the First Age. (Note: Tolkien 1977, "Quenta Silmarillion", ch. 6 "Of Fëanor and the Unchaining of Melkor") (Note: Tolkien 1977, "Quenta Silmarillion", ch. 9 "Of the Flight of the Noldor")

== Fictional history ==
=== Ainulindalë and Valaquenta ===
Before the creation of Eä and Arda (the Universe and the World), Melkor is the most powerful of the Ainur, the "angelic beings" created by Eru Ilúvatar. Melkor, dissatisfied that Eru had abandoned the Void, seeks to emulate his creator and fill the Void with sentient beings. This, however, requires the Flame Imperishable, the Secret Fire, which belongs to Eru alone; Melkor cannot find it. He contends with Eru in the Music of the Ainur, introducing themes of his own. (Note: Tolkien 1977, "Ainulindalë") He draws many weaker-willed Ainur to him. Ironically, these attempts do not truly subvert the Music, but elaborate Eru's original intentions: the Music of Eru takes on depth and beauty through the strife and sadness Melkor's disharmonies introduce. Unlike Aulë, Melkor is too proud to admit that his creations are made possible entirely by Eru. Instead, Melkor aspires to rival Eru.

In an early draft, Tolkien has the elf Finrod state that "there is nothing more powerful that is conceivable than Melkor, save Eru only". (Note: Tolkien 1993, p. 322) In The Silmarillion, Eru Ilúvatar similarly states that "Mighty are the Ainur, and mightiest among them is Melkor".

In a 1955 essay, Tolkien emphasizes Morgoth's immense power at the beginning of Arda, beyond all other Valar combined and the most powerful under Eru Ilúvatar: (Note: Tolkien 1993, p. 339)

Melkor must be made far more powerful in original nature. The greatest power under Eru. Later, he must not be able to be controlled or 'chained' by all the Valar combined. Note that in the early age of Arda he was alone able to drive the Valar out of Middle-earth into retreat.

Since the Great Music stands as the template for all of material creation, the chaos introduced by Melkor's disharmonies is responsible for all evil. Everything in Middle-earth is tainted by his influence. In Morgoth's Ring, Tolkien draws an analogy between the One Ring, into which Sauron commits much of his power, and all of Arda – "Morgoth's Ring" – which contains and is corrupted by Melkor's power until the Remaking of the World. (Note: Tolkien 1993, pp. 398–401) The Valaquenta tells how Melkor seduced many of the minor Ainur, the Maiar, into his service. (Note: Tolkien 1977, "Valaquenta")

Tolkien's comparison of "Morgoth's Ring" with Sauron's One Ring
	Sauron	Morgoth
Action	Put much of his power into the One Ring	"Melkor 'incarnated' himself (as Morgoth) permanently"; Transmuted "the greater part of his original 'angelic' powers, of mind and spirit"
Purpose	Gain power over the other Great Rings, and over the physical world	Gain "a terrible grip upon the physical world", the ability "to control the hroa, the 'flesh' or physical matter, of Arda."
Effect	Power "concentrated" in the One Ring	Power "disseminated" through "the whole of Middle-earth"
Outcome	Utterly eradicated when the One Ring is destroyed	Eradication not possible; probable "irretrievable ruin of Arda" by fighting Morgoth

=== Quenta Silmarillion ===
After the Creation, many Ainur enter into Eä. The most powerful of them are the Valar, the Powers of the World; the lesser, the Maiar, act as their followers and assistants. They set about the ordering of the universe and Arda within it, as they understand the themes of Eru. Melkor and his followers enter Eä as well, but he is frustrated that his colleagues do not recognize him as leader of the new realm, despite his great knowledge. In anger and shame, Melkor sets about ruining and undoing whatever the others do. (Note: Tolkien 1977, ch. 1, "Of the Beginning of Days")

Each of the Valar is attracted to a particular aspect of the world. Melkor is drawn to extremes and violence—bitter cold, scorching heat, earthquakes, darkness, burning light. His power is so great that at first the Valar cannot restrain him; he contends with their collective might. Arda is unstable until the Vala Tulkas enters Eä and tips the balance.

The Spring of Arda was lit by two great lamps, Illuin and Ormal, until Melkor attacked and destroyed them. Based on Karen Wynn Fonstad's Atlas of Middle-earth

Driven out by Tulkas, Melkor broods in darkness, until Tulkas is distracted. Melkor destroys the Two Lamps and the Valar's land of Almaren. Arda is plunged into darkness and fire, and Melkor withdraws to Middle-earth. In later versions, Melkor also disperses agents throughout Arda, digging deep into the earth and constructing great pits and fortresses, as Arda is marred by darkness and rivers of fire.

The Valar withdraw into Aman in the far West. The country where they settle is called Valinor, which they heavily fortify. Melkor holds dominion over Middle-earth from his fortress of Utumno in the North. His first reign ends after the Elves, the eldest of the Children of Ilúvatar, awake at the shores of Cuiviénen, and the Valar resolve to rescue them from his malice. Melkor captures some Elves before the Valar attack. He tortures and corrupts them, breeding the first Orcs. (Note: Tolkien 1977, ch. 3 "Of the Coming of the Elves and the Captivity of Melkor") Other versions describe Orcs as corruptions of Men, or as soulless beings animated solely by the will of their evil lord. His fortress Utumno disperses deathly cold and brings on an endless winter in the North; for the sake of the Elves, the Valar wage a seven-year war with Melkor, defeating him after laying siege to Utumno. These battles further mar Arda. Tulkas defeats Melkor, binds him with a specially forged chain, Angainor, and brings him to Valinor. He is imprisoned in the Halls of Mandos for three ages. (Note: Tolkien 1993, pp. 416-421)

Upon his release, Melkor is paroled to Valinor, though a few of the Valar continue to mistrust him. He pretends humility and virtue, but secretly plots harm toward the Elves, whose awakening he blames for his defeat. The Noldor, most skilled of the three kindreds of Elves that had come to Valinor, are most vulnerable to his plots, since they are eager for his knowledge. While instructing them, he awakens unrest and discontent among them. When the Valar become aware of this, they send Tulkas to arrest him, but Melkor has already fled. With the aid of Ungoliant, a dark spirit in the form of a monstrous spider, he destroys the Two Trees of Valinor, kills Finwë, the King of the Noldor, and steals the three Silmarils, jewels made by Finwë's son Fëanor, filled with the light of the Trees. Fëanor thereupon names him Morgoth, "Black Foe", and the Elves know him by this name alone afterwards.

Morgoth resumes his rule in the North of Middle-earth, this time in the half-ruined fortress of Angband. He rebuilds it, and raises above it the volcanic triple peak of Thangorodrim. The Silmarils he sets into a crown of iron, which he wears at all times. Fëanor and most of the Noldor pursue him, along the way slaying their kin the Teleri and incurring the Doom of Mandos. On arriving in Beleriand, the Noldor establish kingdoms and make war on Morgoth. Soon, the Sun and the Moon rise for the first time, (Note: Tolkien 1977, ch. 11, "Of the Sun and Moon") and Men awake. (Note: Tolkien 1977, ch. 12, "Of Men") The major battles include the Dagor-nuin-Giliath (Battle Under the Stars, fought before the first rising of the Moon), Dagor Aglareb (Glorious Battle), (Note: Tolkien 1977, ch. 13, "Of the Return of the Noldor") Dagor Bragollach (Battle of Sudden Flame) at which the Siege of Angband is broken, (Note: Tolkien 1977, ch. 18, "Of the Ruin of Beleriand") and the battle of Nírnaeth Arnoediad (Unnumbered Tears) when the armies of the Noldor and the Men allied with them are routed and the men of the East join Morgoth. (Note: Tolkien 1977, ch. 20, "Of the Fifth Battle: Nirnaeth Arnoediad") Over the next several decades, Morgoth destroys the remaining Elven kingdoms, reducing their domain to an island of refugees in the Bay of Balar, and a small settlement at the Mouths of Sirion under the protection of Ulmo. (Note: Tolkien 1977, ch. 22, "Of the Ruin of Doriath") (Note: Tolkien 1977, ch. 23, "Of the Fall of Gondolin")

Before the Nírnaeth Arnoediad, the Man Beren and the Elf Lúthien enter Angband and recover a Silmaril from Morgoth's crown after Luthien's singing sends him to sleep. It is inherited by their granddaughter Elwing, who joins those dwelling at the Mouths of Sirion. Her husband Eärendil, wearing the Silmaril on his brow, sails across the sea to Valinor, where he pleads with the Valar to liberate Middle-earth from Morgoth. (Note: Tolkien 1977, ch. 19 "Of Beren and Lúthien")

During the ensuing War of Wrath, Beleriand is destroyed. Morgoth summons many Men to his side during the fifty-year conflict, the longest and bloodiest in Arda's history. Morgoth is utterly defeated. Thangorodrim is shattered when Eärendil kills the greatest of dragons, Ancalagon the Black, who crashes upon it as he falls. The few remaining dragons are scattered, and the few surviving Balrogs hide themselves deep within the earth. Morgoth flees into the deepest pit and begs for pardon, but his feet are cut from under him, his crown is made into a collar, and he is chained once again with Angainor. The Valar exile him permanently from the world, thrusting him through the Door of Night into the void until the prophesied Dagor Dagorath, when he will meet his final destruction. But his evil remains, and his will influences all living creatures. (Note: Tolkien 1977, ch. 24, "Of the Voyage of Eärendil and the War of Wrath")

=== Children of Húrin ===
In this more complete version of a story summarized in the Quenta Silmarillion, Húrin and his younger brother Huor are leaders of the House of Hador, one of the three kindred of elf-friends. At the Nírnaeth Arnoediad they cover the escape of Turgon to Gondolin by sacrificing their army and themselves. Huor is slain, but Húrin is brought before Morgoth alive. As revenge for his aid to Turgon and his defiance, Morgoth curses Húrin and his children, binding Húrin to a seat upon Thangorodrim and forcing him to witness all that happens (using Morgoth's long sight) to his children in the succeeding years. The encounter with Húrin is set out in more detail than in The Silmarillion, and in a more connected narrative than in Unfinished Tales. It gives the first allusion to the corruption of Men by Morgoth soon after their awakening, and the assertion by Morgoth of his power over the entire Earth through "the shadow of my purpose". (Note: Tolkien 2007, ch. 3, "The Words of Húrin and Morgoth")

=== The Lord of the Rings ===
Melkor is mentioned briefly in the chapter "A Knife in the Dark" in The Lord of the Rings, where Aragorn sings the story of Tinúviel and briefly recounts the role of Morgoth ("the Great Enemy") in the wider history of the Silmarils. (Note: Tolkien 1954a, book 1, ch. 11 "A Knife in the Dark")

== Development ==
In the early versions of Tolkien's stories, Melkor/Morgoth is not seen as the most powerful of the Valar. He is described as being equal in power to Manwë, chief of the Valar in Arda. (Note: Tolkien 1977, "Valaquenta", "Of the Enemies") But his power increases in later revisions of the story until he becomes the most powerful among them, (Note: Tolkien 1977, Ainulindalë) and in a late essay more powerful than all of the other Valar combined. He develops from a standout among equals into a being so powerful that the other created beings could not utterly defeat him. (Note: Tolkien 1993, pp. 390-393)

Over time, Tolkien altered both the conception of this character and his name. The name given by Fëanor, Morgoth, was present from the first stories; he was for a long time also called Melko. Tolkien vacillated over the Sindarin equivalent of this, which appeared as Belcha, Melegor, and Moeleg. The meaning of the name also varied, related in different times to milka ("greedy") or velka ("flame"). (Note: Tolkien 1984, p. 260) Similarly the Old English translations devised by Tolkien differ in sense: Melko is rendered as Orgel ("Pride") and Morgoth as Sweart-ós ("Black God"). (Note: Tolkien 1986, pp. 281-283) Morgoth is once given a particular sphere of interest: in the early Tale of Turambar, Tinwelint (precursor of Thingol) names him "the Vala of Iron". (Note: Tolkien 1984b, "Turambar and the Foalókë", p. 73)

== Analysis ==
=== Satanic figure ===
The Silmarillion's Melkor/Morgoth parallels the Book of Genesis's Lucifer/Satan.

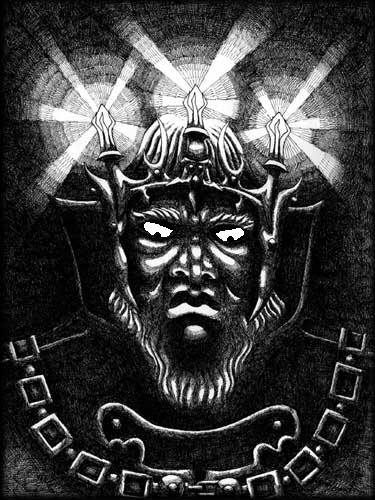
"Morgoth – the first Dark Lord". Middle-earth artwork by Outcast, 2008

Melkor has been interpreted as analogous to Satan, once the greatest of all God's angels, Lucifer, but fallen through pride; he rebels against his creator. Tolkien wrote that of all the deeds of the Ainur, by far the worst was "the absolute Satanic rebellion and evil of Morgoth and his satellite Sauron". (Note: Carpenter 2023, #156 to Robert Murray, S.J., 4 November 1954) John R. Holmes, writing in The J. R. R. Tolkien Encyclopedia, suggests that Melkor's nature resonates with John Milton's fallen angel (Satan) in Paradise Lost. Melkor creates an "iron hell" for his elven slave labourers. His greed for ever more power makes him a symbol for the despotism of modern machinery. The Tolkien scholar Brian Rosebury comments that there is a clear mapping to the Christian myth, with Eru as God, the Ainur as angels, and Melkor as Satan; but that the differences are equally striking, as creation is in part mediated by the Ainur. His rebellion against Eru is creative, as Melkor is impatient for the void of the world to be filled with things. But his creativity becomes destructive, as it is tainted with pride. "His desire to create other beings for his glory" turns into a desire for servants and slaves to follow his own will. This "temptation of creativity" is echoed in Tolkien's work by Melkor's opponent Fëanor, who is prepared to fight a hopeless war to try to regain his prized creations, the Silmarils. The Tolkien scholar Tom Shippey writes that The Silmarillion is most obviously a calque on the Book of Genesis (whereas Tolkien's Shire is a calque upon England). Shippey quotes Tolkien's friend C. S. Lewis, who stated that even Satan was created good; Tolkien has the character Elrond in The Lord of the Rings say "For nothing is evil in the beginning. Even [the Dark Lord] Sauron was not so." (Note: Tolkien 1954a, "The Council of Elrond") Shippey concludes that the reader is free to assume "that the exploit of Morgoth of which the Eldar [Elves] never learnt was the traditional seduction of Adam and Eve by the [Satanic] serpent", while the Men in the story are Adam's descendants "flying from Eden and subject to the curse of Babel".

=== Odinic figure ===
The Tolkien scholar Marjorie Burns writes in Tolkien's Legendarium: Essays on The History of Middle-earth that Morgoth, like all Tolkien's Middle-earth characters, is based on a complex "literary soup". One element of his construction, she states, is the Norse god Odin. Tolkien used aspects of Odin's character and appearance for the wandering wizard Gandalf, with hat, beard, and staff, and a supernaturally fast horse, recalling Odin's steed Sleipnir; for the Dark Lord Sauron, with his single eye; for the corrupted white wizard Saruman, cloaked and hatted like Gandalf, but with far-flying birds like Odin's eagles and ravens. In The Silmarillion, too, the farseeing Vala Manwë, who lives on the tallest of the mountains, and loves "all swift birds, strong of wing", is Odinesque. And just as Sauron and Saruman oppose Gandalf in The Lord of the Rings, so the enemy Morgoth gets Odin's negative characteristics: "his ruthlessness, his destructiveness, his malevolence, his all-pervading deceit". Burns compares this allocation to the way that Norse myth allots some of Odin's characteristics to the troublemaker god Loki. Odin has many names, among them "Shifty-eyed" and "Swift in Deceit", and he is equally a god of the Norse underworld, "Father of the Slain". She notes that Morgoth, too, is named "Master of Lies" and "Demon of Dark", and functions as a fierce god of battle.

=== Embodiment of possessiveness ===
The Tolkien scholar Verlyn Flieger, discussing the splintering of the original created light of Middle-earth, likens Melkor/Morgoth's response to the Silmarils to that of Fëanor, who had created those jewels. She states that the central temptation is the desire to possess, and that possessiveness itself is the "great transgression" in Tolkien's created world. She observes that the commandment "Love not too well the work of thy hands and the devices of thy heart" is stated explicitly in The Silmarillion. Flieger compares Tolkien's descriptions of the two characters: "the heart of Fëanor was fast bound to these things that he himself had made", followed at once by "Melkor lusted for the Silmarils, and the very memory of their radiance was a gnawing fire in his heart". She writes that it is appropriately ironic that Melkor and Fëanor, one the greatest of the Ainur, the other the most subtle and skilful of the creative Noldor among the Elves – should "usher in the darkness".

== See also ==
- Maedhros
