= Elvish languages of Middle-earth =

Group of fictional languages in the fantasy works of J. R. R. Tolkien

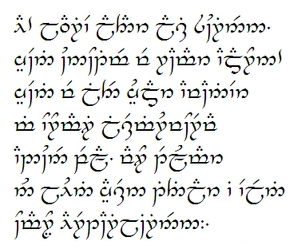
The first stanza of Tolkien's Quenya poem "Namárië", written in his Tengwar script.

The Elvish languages of Middle-earth, constructed by J. R. R. Tolkien, include Quenya and Sindarin. These were the various languages spoken by the Elves of Middle-earth as they developed as a society throughout the Ages. In his pursuit of realism and in his love of language, Tolkien was especially fascinated with the development and evolution of language through time. Tolkien created two almost fully developed languages and a dozen more in various beginning stages as he studied and reproduced the way that language adapts and morphs. A philologist by profession, he spent much time on his constructed languages. In the collection of letters he had written, posthumously published by his son, Christopher Tolkien, he stated that he began stories set within this secondary world, the realm of Middle-earth, not with the characters or narrative as one would assume, but with a created set of languages. The stories and characters serve as conduits to make those languages come to life. Inventing language was always a crucial piece of Tolkien's mythology and world building. As Tolkien stated:

The invention of languages is the foundation. The 'stories' were made rather to provide a world for the languages than the reverse. To me a name comes first and the story follows. (Note: Carpenter 2023, #165 to Houghton Mifflin, June 1955)

Tolkien created scripts for his Elvish languages, of which the best known are Sarati, Tengwar, and Cirth.

== External history ==
=== Language construction ===
J. R. R. Tolkien began to construct his first Elvin tongue c. 1910–1911 while he was at the King Edward's School, Birmingham and which he later named Quenya (c. 1915). At that time, Tolkien was already familiar with Latin, Greek, Italian, Spanish, and three ancient Germanic languages: Gothic, Old Norse, and Old English. He had invented several cryptographic codes such as Animalic, and two or three constructed languages including Naffarin. He then discovered Finnish, which he described many years later as "like discovering a complete wine-cellar filled with bottles of an amazing wine of a kind and flavour never tasted before. It quite intoxicated me." (Note: Carpenter 2023, #214 to A. C. Nunn, late 1958)

The ingredients in Quenya are various, but worked out into a self-consistent character not precisely like any language that I know. Finnish, which I came across when I first begun to construct a 'mythology' was a dominant influence, but that has been much reduced [now in late Quenya]. It survives in some features: such as the absence of any consonant combinations initially, the absence of the voiced stops b, d, g (except in mb, nd, ng, ld, rd, which are favoured) and the fondness for the ending -inen, -ainen, -oinen, also in some points of grammar, such as the inflexional endings -sse (rest at or in), -nna (movement to, towards), and -llo (movement from); the personal possessives are also expressed by suffixes; there is no gender. (Note: From a letter to W. R. Matthews, dated 13–15 June 1964, published in Parma Eldalamberon 17, p. 135.)

Tolkien with his Quenya pursued a double aesthetic goal: "classical and inflected". (Note: Parma Eldalamberon 17, p. 135) This urge was the motivation for his creation of a 'mythology'. While the language developed, he needed speakers, history for the speakers and all real dynamics, like war and migration: "It was primarily linguistic in inspiration and was begun in order to provide the necessary background of 'history' for Elvish tongues". (Note: Tolkien, J. R. R. The Lord of the Rings, "Foreword to the Second Edition".)

The Elvish languages underwent countless revisions in grammar, mostly in conjugation and the pronominal system. The Elven vocabulary was not subject to sudden or extreme change; except during the first conceptual stage c. 1910–c. 1920. Tolkien sometimes changed the "meaning" of an Elvish word, but he almost never disregarded it once invented, and he kept on refining its meaning, and forged countless new synonyms. Moreover, Elven etymology was in constant flux. Tolkien delighted in inventing new etymons for his Elvish vocabulary.

From the outset, Tolkien used comparative philology and the tree model as his major tools in his constructed languages. He usually started with the phonological system of the proto-language and then proceeded to invent the many mechanisms of sound change needed for each daughter language.

I find the construction and the interrelation of the languages an aesthetic pleasure in itself, quite apart from The Lord of the Rings, of which it was/is in fact independent. (Note: Letter from Tolkien to a reader, published in Parma Eldalamberon 17, p. 61)

Tolkien stated that he intentionally designed Sindarin to be in relation to Quenya as medieval Welsh is to Latin. Nelson Goering analysed this claim, finding it broadly reasonable, if the relationships are allowed to be of different kinds.

Nelson Goering's analysis of Tolkien's claim that Sindarin is to Quenya as Welsh is to Latin
Elvish language	Features	Resemblances	European language
Quenya "snake", a name leuka, Makalaure	High language, "Elven-Latin"; 1) "Used for ceremony, and for high matters of lore and song" 2) Spelling system is Latin-like	Cultural parallels of Quenya and Latin: ancient language, now in learned use	Latin "fountain", "state" fontana, civitat
Sindarin changed more than Quenya from ancient Eldarin lŷg, Maglor	Colloquial language 1) Initial consonant mutations 2) General phonological structure 3) i-mutation (i-umlaut) to form noun plurals	Linguistic parallels of Sindarin and Welsh: Sindarin was designed "to resemble Welsh phonologically"	Welsh borrowed and adapted words from Latin ffynnon, ciwdod

In the early 30s Tolkien decided that the proto-language of the Elves was Valarin, the tongue of the gods or Valar: "The language of the Elves derived in the beginning from the Valar, but they change it even in the learning, and moreover modified and enriched it constantly at all times by their own invention." (Note: J.R.R. Tolkien, "Lambion Ontale: Descent of Tongues", "Tengwesta Qenderinwa" 1, Parma Eldalamberon 18, p. 23.) In his Comparative Tables, Tolkien describes the mechanisms of sound change in the following daughter languages: Qenya, Lindarin (a dialect of Qenya), Telerin, Old Noldorin (or Fëanorian), Noldorin (or Gondolinian), Ilkorin (esp. of Doriath), Danian of Ossiriand, East Danian, Taliska, West Lemberin, North Lemberin, and East Lemberin. (Note: Parma Eldalamberon, 19, pp. 18–28)

In his lifetime J.R.R. Tolkien never ceased to experiment with his constructed languages, and they were subjected to many revisions. They had many grammars with substantial differences between different stages of development. After the publication of The Lord of the Rings (1954–1955), the grammar rules of his major Elvish languages Quenya, Telerin and Sindarin went through very few changes (this is late Elvish 1954–1973).

=== Publication of Tolkien's linguistic papers ===
The linguistic papers published in Vinyar Tengwar and Parma Eldalamberon are listed in the Bibliography of this article.

Two magazines (Vinyar Tengwar, from its issue 39 in July 1998, and Parma Eldalamberon, from its issue 11 in 1995) are exclusively devoted to the editing and publishing of J.R.R. Tolkien's gigantic mass of previously unpublished linguistic papers, including those omitted by Christopher Tolkien from "The History of Middle-earth".

== Internal history ==
=== At the time of the Lhammas and The Etymologies, 1937 ===
The Elvish languages are a family of several related languages and dialects. In 1937, Tolkien drafted the Lhammas and The Etymologies, both edited and published in the 1987 The Lost Road and Other Writings. They depict a tree of languages analogous to that of the Indo-European languages that Tolkien knew as a philologist.

Elvish and Indo-European language trees compared. Tolkien, a philologist, was intensely interested in the evolution of language families, and modelled his fictional languages and their evolution on real ones. The language names and evolution shown for Middle-earth are as used in the 1937 Lhammas.

This was internally consistent, but for one thing, the history of the Noldor, central to the story. Their language, Noldorin, evolved very slowly in the changeless atmosphere of Valinor. Tolkien had developed its linguistics in some detail. With their return to Beleriand, the language was evidently sharply distinct from Qenya, implying rapid change. As Tolkien worked on The Lord of the Rings, starting soon after The Hobbit was published in 1937, the matter troubled him. He came up with a radical solution: the Noldor adopted the local language, Sindarin, as spoken by the Sindar or Grey-Elves, when they settled in Beleriand. That allowed Noldorin to be, more plausibly, a scarcely-altered dialect of Quenya; and it freed up his linguistically-developed material to be rebadged as Sindarin, which would have had a long time to evolve in Middle-earth. This was to some extent an awkward solution, as Sindarin had quite different origins, and could have developed rather differently. Tolkien reshaped his "Tree of Tongues" accordingly.

Elvish language evolution as described in the Lhammas and assumed in The Etymologies, 1937

Elvish language evolution once Tolkien had The Lord of the Rings under development, 1938 onwards. Sindarin has replaced Noldorin. The 'new' Noldorin is just the Noldor's not very distinct dialect of Quenya.

The Etymologies is Tolkien's etymological dictionary of the Elvish languages, contemporaneous with the Lhammas. It is a list of roots of the Proto-Elvish language, from which he built his many Elvish languages, especially Quenya, Noldorin and Ilkorin. The Etymologies, never meant to be published, does not form a unified whole, but incorporates layer upon layer of changes. In his introduction to The Etymologies, Christopher Tolkien wrote that his father was "more interested in the processes of change than he was in displaying the structure and use of the languages at any given time." (Note: Tolkien 1987, pp. 378–379)

Etymology of 'Glamdring' in Tolkien's Elvish languages, as described in the 1937 Etymologies. (Note: Tolkien 1987, pp. 385–448 The Etymologies) Noldorin is in the place soon to be occupied by Sindarin.

=== With The Lord of the Rings ===
The story of the Elvish languages as conceived by Tolkien from when he began working on The Lord of the Rings is that they all originated from Primitive Quendian or Quenderin, the proto-language of all the Elves who awoke together in the far east of Middle-earth, Cuiviénen, and began "naturally" to make a language. With the sundering of the Elves, all the Elvish languages are presumed to be descendants of this common ancestor, including the two languages that Tolkien developed most fully, Quenya and Sindarin, as shown in the tree diagram. (Note: J.R.R. Tolkien, "Tengwesta Qenderinwa", Parma Eldalamberon 18, p. 72)

- Primitive Quendian
  - **Quenya**
    - Common Telerin
      - Telerin (Silvan)
      - Nandorin
      - **Sindarin**
    - Noldorin Quenya (later, Exilic Quenya)
    - Vanyarin Quenya
  - Avarin (6+ languages)

In detail, Tolkien invented two subfamilies (subgroups) of the Elvish languages. "The language of the Quendelie (Elves) was thus very early sundered into the branches Eldarin and Avarin". These further subdivided as follows:

- Avarin is the language of various Elves of the Second and Third Clans, who refused to come to Valinor. It developed into at least six Avarin languages.
- Common Eldarin is the language of the three clans of the Eldar during the Great March to Valinor. It developed into:
  - **Quenya**, the language of the Elves in Valinor (Eldamar) beyond the Sea; it divided into:
    - Vanyarin Quenya or Quendya, colloquial speech of the Vanyar, the Elves of the First Clan;
    - Noldorin Quenya (and later Exilic Quenya, when the Noldor moved from Valinor to Beleriand), colloquial speech of the Noldor, the Elves of the Second Clan.
  - Common Telerin, the early language of all the Teleri
    - Telerin, the language of the Teleri, Elves of the Third Clan, living in Tol Eressëa and Alqualondë in Valinor.
    - Nandorin, the language of the Nandor, a branch of the Third Clan. It developed into various Nandorin and Silvan languages.
    - **Sindarin** is the language of the Sindar, a branch of the Third Clan, who dwelt in Beleriand. Its dialects include Doriathrin, in Doriath; Falathrin, in the Falas of Beleriand; North Sindarin, in Dorthonion and Hithlum; Noldorin Sindarin, spoken by the Exiled Noldor.

Elvish Languages mapped to the Sundering of the Elves: Languages (such as Quenya) are shown in Boldface Blue; examples are the words for "Elves" in those languages (such as "Quendi"), shown in Italic Black. These are overlaid on a map of Arda, with Aman on the left, Middle-earth on the right, the arrows and Green labels showing the migrations of the Elvish kindreds. The lowest Elves, the Avari, fragmented into many kindreds with different languages. (Note: Tolkien 1994, "Quendi and Eldar") Locations are diagrammatic.

=== Fictional philology ===
A tradition of philological study of Elvish languages exists within the fiction of Tolkien's frame stories: (Note: J.R.R. Tolkien, "Outline of Phonology", Parma Eldalamberon 19, p. 68.)

The older stages of Quenya were, and doubtless still are, known to the loremasters of the Eldar. It appears from these notices that besides certain ancient songs and compilations of lore that were orally preserved, there existed also some books and many ancient inscriptions.

Elven philologists are called the Lambengolmor; in Quenya, lambe means "spoken language" or "verbal communication." Known members of the Lambengolmor were Rúmil, who invented the first Elvish script (the Sarati), Fëanor who later enhanced and further developed this script into his Tengwar, which later was spread to Middle-earth by the Exiled Noldor and remained in use ever after, and Pengolodh, who is credited with many works, including the Osanwe-kenta and the Lhammas or "The 'Account of Tongues' which Pengolodh of Gondolin wrote in later days in Tol-eressëa". (Note: Tolkien 1987, "The Lhammas")

== Elvish scripts ==
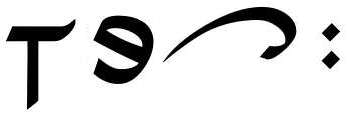
"Sarati" in Tolkien's first Elvish script, Sarati

Tolkien wrote out most samples of Elvish languages with the Latin alphabet, but within the fiction he imagined many writing systems for his Elves. The best-known are the "Tengwar of Fëanor", but the first system he created, c. 1919, is the "Tengwar of Rúmil", also called the sarati. In chronological order, Tolkien's scripts are:

1. Tengwar of Rúmil or Sarati
2. Gondolinic runes (Runes used in the city of Gondolin)
3. Valmaric script
4. Andyoqenya
5. Qenyatic
6. Tengwar of Fëanor
7. The Cirth of Daeron

== See also ==
- Languages constructed by J. R. R. Tolkien
- A Elbereth Gilthoniel

== Sources ==
- Carpenter, Humphrey, ed. (2023) [1981]. The Letters of J. R. R. Tolkien: Revised and Expanded Edition. New York: HarperCollins. ISBN 978-0-35-865298-4.
- Tolkien, J. R. R. (1994). Christopher Tolkien (ed.). The War of the Jewels. Boston: Houghton Mifflin. ISBN 0-395-71041-3.
- Tolkien, J. R. R. (1987). Christopher Tolkien (ed.). The Lost Road and Other Writings. Boston: Houghton Mifflin. ISBN 0-395-45519-7.

== Bibliography ==
This section lists the many sources by Tolkien documenting Elvish texts.

=== Books ===
A small fraction of Tolkien's accounts of Elvish languages was published in his novels and scholarly works during his lifetime.

- 1937 The Hobbit a few elvish names (Elrond, Glamdring, Orcrist); no texts or sentences
- 1954–1955 The Lord of the Rings
- 1962 The Adventures of Tom Bombadil
- 1967 The Road Goes Ever On.

Posthumously:

- 1977 The Silmarillion
- 1980 Unfinished Tales: the "Oath of Cirion"
- 1983 The Monsters and the Critics: "A Secret Vice", with Oilima Markirya, Nieninqe, and Earendel.
- 1987 The Lost Road and Other Writings:
  - "Alboin Errol's Fragments", p. 51
  - "Fíriel's Song", p. 69
  - Lhammas, explaining the relationships between the languages, pp. 182–217
  - The Etymologies, adding some 600 words and many links between languages, pp. 377–448
- 2024 The Collected Poems of J. R. R. Tolkien:
  - "Loä yukainen avar Anduinë sí valútier", pp. 1296–1298

=== Posthumous articles ===
Many of Tolkien's writings on his invented languages have been annotated and published by Carl F. Hostetter in the journals Vinyar Tengwar and Parma Eldalamberon, as follows:

- 1989 "The Plotz Quenya Declensions", first published in part in the fanzine Beyond Bree, and later in full in Vinyar Tengwar 6, p. 14.
- 1991 "Koivieneni Sentence" in Vinyar Tengwar 14, pp. 5–20.
- 1992 "New Tengwar Inscription" in Vinyar Tengwar 21, p. 6.
- 1992 "Liège Tengwar Inscription" in Vinyar Tengwar 23, p. 16.
- 1993 "Two Trees Sentence" in Vinyar Tengwar 27, pp. 7–42.
- 1993 "Koivieneni Manuscript" in Vinyar Tengwar 27, pp. 7–42.
- 1993 "The Bodleian Declensions", in Vinyar Tengwar 28, pp. 9–34.
- 1994 "The Entu Declension" in Vinyar Tengwar 36, pp. 8–29.
- 1995 "Gnomish Lexicon", Parma Eldalamberon 11.
- 1995 "Rúmilian Document" in Vinyar Tengwar 37, pp. 15–23.
- 1998 "Qenya Lexicon", Parma Eldalamberon 12.
- 1998 "Ósanwe-kenta, Enquiry into the communication of thought", Vinyar Tengwar 39
- 1998 "From Quendi and Eldar, Appendix D". Vinyar Tengwar 39, pp. 4–20.
- 1999 "Narqelion", Vinyar Tengwar 40, pp. 5–32
- 2000 "Etymological Notes: Ósanwe-kenta", Vinyar Tengwar 41, pp. 5–6
- 2000 "From The Shibboleth of Fëanor" (written c. 1968), Vinyar Tengwar 41, pp. 7–10 (A part of The Shibboleth of Fëanor was published in The Peoples of Middle-earth, pp. 331–366.)
- 2000 "Notes on Óre", Vinyar Tengwar 41, pp. 11–19
- 2000 "Merin Sentence", Tyalië Tyelelliéva 14, p. 32–35
- 2001 "The Rivers and Beacon-hills of Gondor" (written 1967–1969), Vinyar Tengwar 42, pp. 5–31.
- 2001 "Essay on negation in Quenya", Vinyar Tengwar 42, pp. 33–34.
- 2001 "Goldogrim Pronominal Prefixes", Parma Eldalamberon 13 p. 97.
- 2001 "Early Noldorin Grammar", Parma Eldalamberon 13, pp. 119–132.
- 2002 "Words of Joy: Five Catholic Prayers in Quenya (Part One)", Vinyar Tengwar 43:
  - "Ataremma" (Pater Noster in Quenya), versions I–VI, p. 4–26
  - "Aia María" (Ave Maria in Quenya), versions I–IV, pp. 26–36
  - "Alcar i Ataren" (Gloria Patri in Quenya), pp. 36–38
- 2002 "Words of Joy: Five Catholic Prayers in Quenya (Part Two)", Vinyar Tengwar 44:
  - "Litany of Loreto" in Quenya, pp. 11–20.
  - "Ortírielyanna" (Sub tuum praesidium in Quenya), pp. 5–11
  - "Alcar mi tarmenel na Erun" (Gloria in Excelsis Deo in Quenya), pp. 31–38.
  - "Ae Adar Nín" (Pater Noster in Sindarin), Vinyar Tengwar 44, pp. 21–30.
- 2003 "Early Qenya Fragments", Parma Eldalamberon 14.
- 2003 "Early Qenya Grammar", Parma Eldalamberon 14.
- 2003 "The Valmaric Scripts", Parma Eldalamberon 14.
- 2004 "Sí Qente Feanor and Other Elvish Writings", ed. Smith, Gilson, Wynne, and Welden, Parma Eldalamberon 15.
- 2005 "Eldarin Hands, Fingers & Numerals (Part One)". Edited by Patrick H. Wynne. Vinyar Tengwar 47, pp. 3–43.
- 2005 "Eldarin Hands, Fingers & Numerals (Part Two)". Edited by Patrick H. Wynne. Vinyar Tengwar 48, pp. 4–34.
- 2006 "Pre-Fëanorian Alphabets", Part 1, ed. Smith, Parma Eldalamberon 16.
- 2006 "Early Elvish Poetry: Oilima Markirya, Nieninqe and Earendel", ed. Gilson, Welden, and Hostetter, Parma Eldalamberon 16
- 2006 "Qenya Declensions", "Qenya Conjugations", "Qenya Word-lists", ed. Gilson, Hostetter, Wynne, Parma Eldalamberon 16
- 2007 "Eldarin Hands, Fingers & Numerals (Part Three)". Edited by Patrick H. Wynne. Vinyar Tengwar 49, pp. 3–37.
- 2007 "Five Late Quenya Volitive Inscriptions". Vinyar Tengwar 49, pp. 38–58.
- 2007 "Ambidexters Sentence", Vinyar Tengwar 49
- 2007 "Words, Phrases and Passages in Various Tongues in The Lord of the Rings", edited by Gilson, Parma Eldalamberon 17.
- 2009 "Tengwesta Qenderinwa", ed. Gilson, Smith and Wynne, Parma Eldalamberon 18.
- 2009 "Pre-Fëanorian Alphabets, Part 2", Parma Eldalamberon 18.
- 2010 "Quenya Phonology", Parma Eldalamberon 19.
- 2010 "Comparative Tables", Parma Eldalamberon 19.
- 2010 "Outline of Phonetic Development", Parma Eldalamberon 19.
- 2010 "Outline of Phonology", Parma Eldalamberon 19.
- 2012 "The Qenya Alphabet", Parma Eldalamberon 20.
- 2013 "The 'Túrin Wrapper'", Vinyar Tengwar 50
- 2013 "Qenya: Declension of Nouns", Parma Eldalamberon 21.
- 2013 "Primitive Quendian: Final Consonants", Parma Eldalamberon 21.
- 2013 "Common Eldarin: Noun Structure", Parma Eldalamberon 21.
- 2015 "The Fëanorian Alphabet, Part 1", Parma Eldalamberon 22.
- 2015 "Quenya Verb Structure", Parma Eldalamberon 22.
- 2024 "The Fëanorian Alphabet, Part 2", Parma Eldalamberon 23.
- 2024 "Eldarin Pronouns", Parma Eldalamberon 23.

See also Douglas A. Anderson, Carl F. Hostetter: A Checklist, Tolkien Studies 4 (2007).
