= Sundering of the Elves =

Events in J. R. R. Tolkien's fictional universe

In J. R. R. Tolkien's legendarium, the sundering of the Elves is the complex process in which the immortal Elves successively break up into many groups with multiple causes of dissent between them. They awoke at Cuiviénen on the continent of Middle-earth, where they were divided into three tribes: Minyar (the Firsts), Tatyar (the Seconds) and Nelyar (the Thirds). After some time, they were summoned by Oromë to live with the Valar in Valinor, on Aman. That summoning and the Great Journey that followed split the Elves into two main groups (and many minor ones), which were never fully reunited.

Tolkien stated that the stories were made to create a world for his elvish languages, not the reverse. The Tolkien scholar Tom Shippey writes that The Silmarillion derived from the linguistic relationship between the two languages, Quenya and Sindarin, of the divided Elves. The Tolkien scholar Verlyn Flieger states that Tolkien used the Indo-European type of proto-language as his model. In her view, the sundering of the Elves reflects the progressive decline and fall in Middle-earth from its initial perfection; the highest Elves are those who deviated least from that state, meaning that in Tolkien's scheme, ancestry is a guide to character.

== Context ==
=== Author ===
J. R. R. Tolkien (1892–1973) is best known as the author of the high fantasy works The Hobbit and The Lord of the Rings and a professional philologist. He created a family of invented languages for Elves, carefully designing the differences between them to reflect their distance from their imaginary common origin. He stated that his languages led him to create the invented mythology of The Silmarillion, to provide a world in which his languages could have existed. In that world, the splintering of the Elvish peoples mirrored the fragmentation of their languages.

=== Awakening of the Elves ===
In Tolkien's legendarium, the Elves awoke at Cuiviénen, a bay on the eastern side of the Sea of Helcar, on the continent of Middle-earth, where they were divided into three tribes: Minyar (the Firsts), Tatyar (the Seconds) and Nelyar (the Thirds). After some time, they were summoned by the Vala Oromë, the huntsman, to live with him and the other Valar in Valinor, on Aman. The Eldar are those who accepted the summons. Their name, literally Star People, was given to them by Oromë, in their own language, Primitive Quendian. The Avari are those who refused the summons. Half of the Avari (the "refusers") came from the largest tribe, the Nelyar, but most of the Nelyar went on the journey. (Note: "The proportions, out of 144, that when the March began became Avari or Eldar were approximately: Minyar 14: Avari 0, Eldar 14; Tatyar 56: Avari 28, Eldar 28; Nelyar 74: Avari 28, Eldar 46: Amanyar Teleri 20, Sindar and Nandor 26." (Nandor 8 - p. 412) It can be seen that the Avari are made up of roughly equal numbers of Tatyar and Nelyar. (Note: Tolkien 1994, "Quendi and Eldar"))

== Sundering of the Eldar ==
Arda in the First Age. The Elves awoke at Cuiviénen, on the Sea of Helcar (right) in Middle-earth, and many of them (green titles for kindreds) migrated (arrows) westwards to Valinor in Aman, though some stopped in Beleriand (top), and others returned to Beleriand later (red arrows). Those who obeyed the summons to Aman were known as the Eldar; the rest, the Avari or refusers. Those who saw the light of the Two Trees of Valinor in the blessed land of Aman were called Calaquendi, Elves of Light; those who did not were called the Moriquendi, Elves of Darkness. Locations are diagrammatic.

The Eldar migrated westwards across the north of Middle-earth in their three groups. The Minyar became known as the Vanyar, meaning the Fair Elves, with golden-blond hair. The Tatyar who migrated west became known as the Noldor or Deep Elves, with deep knowledge of crafts and skills. The Nelyar who went west were known as the Teleri (Those who come last) or, as they called themselves, the Lindar or Singers. They stayed on the east of Aman, in Tol Eressëa.

=== Sindar ===
Those of the Teleri who reached Beleriand by the Great Sea but chose not to cross to Valinor were later called the Sindar (Grey Elves); their language was Sindarin. They stayed in the west of Middle-earth and were ruled by Thingol (Elwë). Many of the Sindar chose to remain behind to look for their lord Thingol, who disappeared near the end of the journey. These later inhabited Doriath, and were named the Iathrim or People of the Girdle, for the magical 'Girdle of Melian' that surrounded and protected the kingdom. (Note: Tolkien 1977, ch. 21 "Of Túrin Turambar")

Those who came to the shores of the Great Sea of Belegaer but decided to stay there, or who arrived too late to be ferried, were called the Falathrim (People of the Shore). They were ruled by Círdan the Shipwright.

Those who chose to remain behind and populated the lands to the north-west of Beleriand were called the Mithrim or Grey People, giving their name to the region and the great lake there. Most of them later merged with the Noldor who returned to Middle-earth, especially those of Gondolin. (Note: Tolkien 1977, ch. 24 "Of the Voyage of Eärendil and the War of Wrath") Those who reached Aman were called Amanyar Teleri; they were also called the Falmari, the People of the Waves, expert with ships and the sea. (Note: Tolkien 1977, ch. 3 "Of the Coming of the Elves and the Captivity of Melkor")

=== Nandor ===
Those of the Teleri who refused to cross the Misty Mountains and stayed in the valley of Anduin were called the Nandor (Those [Elves] who turn back). Those of the Nandor who later entered Beleriand were called the Laiquendi (Green Elves or Green People, so named because their attire was often green.) "Laiquendi" was the term in Quenya, while the Sindarin version was "Laegrim". They settled in Ossiriand, an eastern region of Beleriand, and were famous for their singing. Hearing of the peaceful territories of King Thingol, Denethor, son of Lenwë, collected as many of his scattered people as he could and finally ventured westward over the Ered Luin into Ossiriand. Although in some instances the Green-elves of Ossiriand did participate in the battles and strife concerning Morgoth (the First Battle of Beleriand for example), they were for the most part a simple, peaceful, and reclusive people. The Nandor who stayed around Anduin became known as the Tawarwaith, living in Lothlórien and Mirkwood; they were also called Silvan or Wood Elves. They were joined there by those Avari who eventually decided to move to the West. (Note: Tolkien 1980, "The History of Galadriel and Celeborn", "Appendix A: The Silvan Elves and their Speech")

=== Vanyar ===
The Vanyar were the fairest and most noble of the High Elves; their name means "the Fair", as they have golden hair. (Note: Tolkien 1977, ch. 16 "Of Maeglin") Their small clan was founded by Imin, the first Elf to awaken at Cuiviénen, with his wife Iminyë and their twelve companions: they broadly correspond to the Minyar. Ingwë was the Vanya Elf to travel with the Vala Oromë to Valinor, and became their king. The Vanyar spoke a dialect of Quenya called Vanyarin. Since they stayed in Valinor, they played no part in the wars in Beleriand, except for the War of Wrath that brought an end to the region.

=== Dark and Light Elves ===
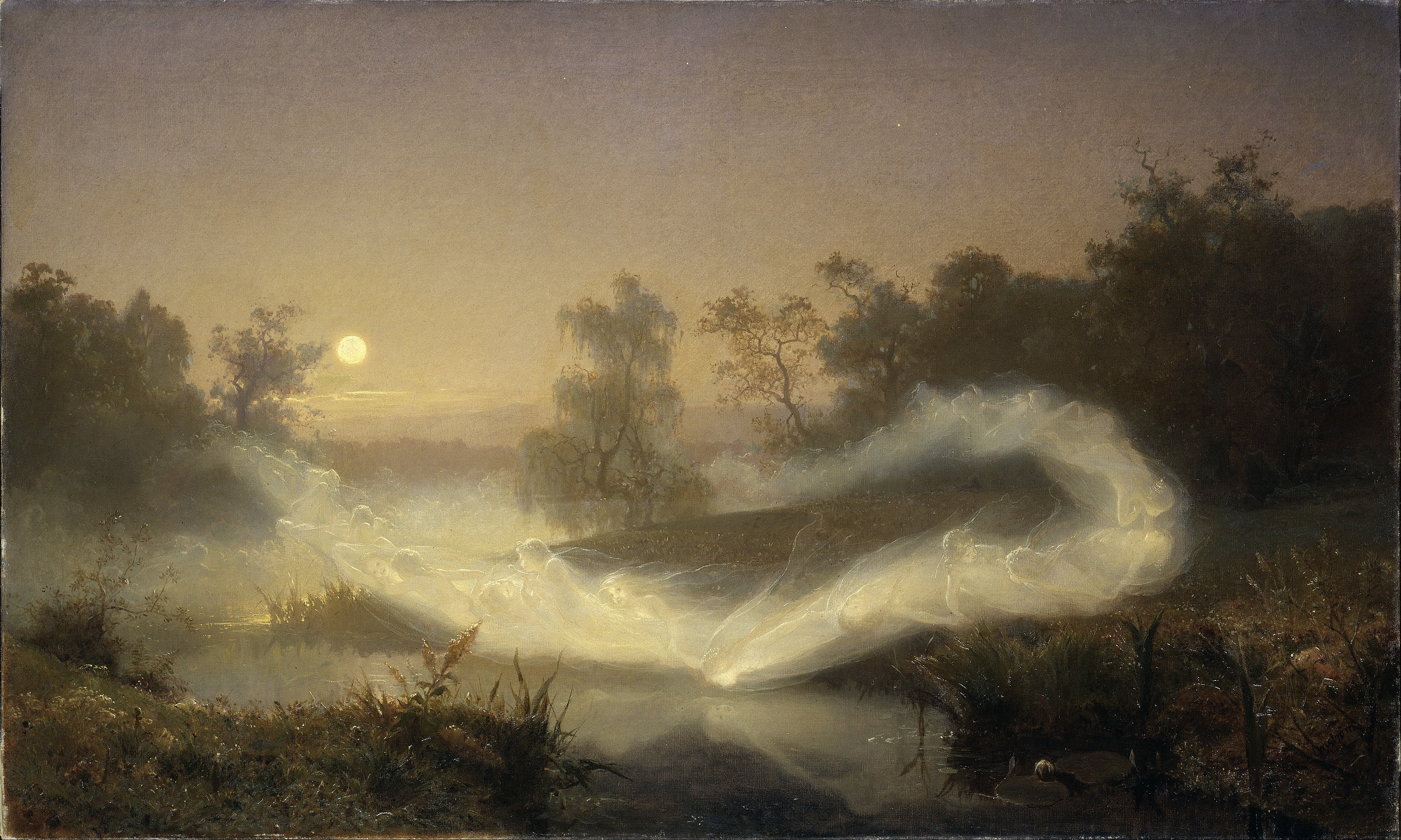
Elves were associated with light and darkness in Norse mythology. 1866 painting Elfplay by August Malmström

The Vanyar, the Noldor, and those of the Teleri who reached Valinor are called the Calaquendi (Elves of Light) because they saw the light of the Two Trees of Valinor. In Quenya, the language of the Noldor in Valinor, all other Elves were called the Moriquendi (Elves of Darkness) in recognition of the fact that they did not see (and did not desire) the Light of Valinor, but later the Sindar were counted among neither of these groups. Instead, Moriquendi was used for all other Elves except Noldor, Vanyar, Falmari, and Sindar. The Sundering allowed Tolkien to explain the existence of Norse mythology's Dökkálfar and Ljósálfar, Dark and Light Elves. The Dark Elves, who lived underground in Svartalfheim ("Black Elfhome"), are rehabilitated by Tolkien as his Moriquendi. The Light Elves lived in Alfheim ("Elfhome") and correspond to his Calaquendi.

=== Noldorin Exiles ===
Most of the Noldor returned with Fëanor to Beleriand in Middle-earth before the raising of the Sun. Fëanor, however, sailed in haste in ships stolen from the (Telerin) Falmari. The Falmari resisted, and Fëanor's Noldor fought and killed them in the First Kinslaying, a battle of Elves upon Elves. In addition, Fëanor left behind his half-brother Fingolfin's Noldor, who also wanted to return. Fingolfin, furious, was obliged to make the perilous journey on foot via the Helcaraxë, the Grinding Ice of the far north. These groups of Noldor became known as the Exiles. In Beleriand they became divided by their place of dwelling, namely Hithlum, Gondolin, Dorthonion, Nargothrond and the March of Maedhros. (Note: Tolkien 1977, ch. 13 "Of the Return of the Noldor") (Note: Tolkien 1977, ch. 14 "Of Beleriand and its Realms")

=== Merging of Noldor and Sindar ===
After the War of Wrath that ended the First Age, the greater part of the surviving Noldor and Sindar (mostly mingled into a single people) returned into the West to dwell in Tol Eressëa. The rest remained in Middle-earth throughout the Second and Third Ages, entering the realm of Mirkwood of the Wood Elves or establishing the kingdoms of Lindon, Eregion, Lothlórien and Imladris.

== Sundering of the Avari ==
After the Separation the Avari became divided even more than the Eldar, though little of their history became known to the Elves and Men of the West of Middle-earth, and they barely feature in the legendarium. At least six kindreds existed, and they continued to call themselves 'Quendi', (Note: This name evolved into different forms in the language of each kindred: Kindi, Cuind, Hwenti, Windan, Kinn-lai and Penni.) considering those who went away, the Eldar, as deserters. Some of these tribes later journeyed westward, intermingling with the Nandor in Rhovanion, and a few even reached Beleriand, though usually remaining on unfriendly terms with the Sindar.

== Analysis ==
Diagram of the Sundering of the Elves, showing Tolkien's overlapping classifications. The names Calaquendi and Moriquendi, Light-Elves and Dark-Elves, correspond to names used in Old Norse, Ljósálfar and Dökkálfar.

Matthew Dickerson, writing in the J.R.R. Tolkien Encyclopedia, notes the "very complicated changes, with shifting meanings assigned to the same names" as Tolkien worked on his conception of the Elves and their divisions and migrations. All the same, he notes, Tolkien kept to a consistent scheme. He states that the sundering of the Elves allowed Tolkien, a professional philologist, to develop two Elvish languages, distinct but related, Quenya for the Eldar and Sindarin for the Sindar, citing Tolkien's own statement that the stories were made to create a world for the languages, not the reverse.

Shippey suggests that the "real root" of The Silmarillion lay in the linguistic relationship, complete with sound-changes and differences of semantics, between the two languages of the divided elves. He adds that the elves are separated not by colour, despite names like light and dark, but by their history, including their migrations.

Elvish Languages Mapped to Kindreds and Migrations: Languages (such as Quenya) are shown in Boldface Blue; examples are the words for "Elves" in those languages (such as "Quendi"), shown in Italic Black. These are overlaid on a map of Arda, with Aman on the left, Middle-earth on the right, the arrows and Green labels showing the migrations of the Elvish kindreds. The highest Elves who went to Aman and saw the light of the Two Trees of Valinor spoke a single ancient language, Quenya. Those Noldor who returned from Aman to Beleriand instead adopted Sindarin, a Telerin language. The lowest Elves, the Avari, fragmented into many kindreds with different languages.

The Tolkien scholar Verlyn Flieger states that in the Lhammas and "The Etymologies" Tolkien used the Indo-European type of proto-languages with branches and sub-branches of language families while inventing his various languages of Middle-earth. This picture of increasing separation is analogous to the progressive decline and fall in Middle-earth from its initial perfection, of which the Sundering of the Elves is a major element. In Tolkien's scheme, the highest Elves are those who deviated least from their initial state (complying with the will of the Valar, travelling to Valinor, and continuing to speak the highest language, Quenya). Conversely, the lowest Elves, the Avari, fragmented into many kindreds with different languages as they eventually spread out across Middle-earth. Tolkien thus intended ancestry to be a guide to character; the differences between the various Elvish languages mirror both the Sundering and the events of The Silmarillion.

== See also ==
- Galadriel
