= The Etymologies (Tolkien) =

Elvish language wordlist

The Etymologies is J. R. R. Tolkien's etymological dictionary of his constructed Elvish languages, written during the 1930s. As a philologist, he was professionally interested in the structure of languages, the relationships between languages, and in particular the processes by which languages evolve. He applied this skill to the construction of the languages of Middle-earth, especially the Elvish languages. The Etymologies reflects this knowledge and enthusiasm: he constantly changed the etymological relationships of his "bases", the roots of his Elvish words. The list of words covers several of his minor languages as well as the two major ones, greatly extending the vocabularies known before it was published in The Lost Road and Other Writings in 1987.

== Context ==
=== Tolkien's philology ===
From his schooldays, J. R. R. Tolkien was in his biographer John Garth's words "effusive about philology"; his schoolfriend Rob Gilson called him "quite a great authority on etymology". Tolkien was a professional philologist, a scholar of comparative and historical linguistics. He was especially familiar with Old English and related languages. He remarked to the poet and The New York Times book reviewer Harvey Breit that "I am a philologist and all my work is philological"; he explained to his American publisher Houghton Mifflin that this was meant to imply that his work was (Note: Carpenter 2023, #165 to Houghton Mifflin, 30 June 1955)

all of a piece, and fundamentally linguistic in inspiration. ... The invention of languages is the foundation. The 'stories' were made rather to provide a world for the languages than the reverse. To me a name comes first and the story follows."

The Tolkien scholar Verlyn Flieger writes that

it is important to remember that all of Tolkien's studies, the focus of his profession, was a concentration on the importance of the word. His profession as philologist and his vocation as writer of fantasy/theology overlapped and mutually supported one another".

In other words, Flieger writes, Tolkien "did not keep his knowledge in compartments; his scholarly expertise informs his creative work." This expertise was founded, in her view, on the belief that one knows a text only by "properly understanding [its] words, their literal meaning and their historical development."

=== Middle-earth ===
Tolkien is best known as the author of the high fantasy works The Hobbit and The Lord of the Rings, both set in Middle-earth. He created a family of invented languages for Elves, carefully designing the differences between them to reflect their distance from their imaginary common origin. He stated that his languages led him to create the invented mythology of The Silmarillion, to provide a world in which his languages could have existed. In that world, the splintering of the Elvish peoples mirrored the fragmentation of their languages.

== Description ==
=== Contents ===
Etymology of 'Glamdring' in Tolkien's Elvish languages, as described in The Etymologies under LAM-, KHOTH-, GLAM-, and DRING- (Note: Tolkien 1987, pp. 385–448 "The Etymologies")

The Etymologies is Tolkien's etymological dictionary of the Elvish languages, written during the 1930s. It was edited by Christopher Tolkien and first published in 1987 as the third part of The Lost Road and Other Writings, the fifth volume of the History of Middle-earth. It is a list of roots of the Proto-Elvish language, from which he built his many Elvish languages, especially Quenya, Noldorin and Ilkorin. It gives many insights into Elvish personal and place names not explained anywhere else. The Etymologies does not form a unified whole, but incorporates layer upon layer of changes. It was not meant to be published.

The Etymologies has the form of a scholarly work listing the "bases" or "roots" of the protolanguage of the Elves: Common Eldarin and Primitive Quendian. Under each base, the next level of words (marked by an asterisk) are "conjectural", that is, not recorded by Elves or Men (it is not stated who wrote The Etymologies inside Middle-earth) but presumed to have existed in the proto-Elvish language. After these, actual words which did exist in the Elvish languages of Danian, Doriathrin (a dialect of Ilkorin), Eldarin (the proto-language of the Eldar), (Exilic) Noldorin, Ilkorin, Lindarin (a dialect of Quenya), Old Noldorin, Primitive Quendian (the oldest proto-language), Qenya, and Telerin are listed.

=== Stage of development ===
Absent from this list of languages is Sindarin, which Tolkien decided, soon after writing The Etymologies and the contemporaneous Lhammas, to make the major language of the Elves in exile in Beleriand. As such it largely replaced Noldorin; eventually Tolkien settled on the explanation that after the Noldor returned to Beleriand from Valinor, they adopted the language used by the Sindar (Grey Elves) already settled there. He decided that the new Noldorin was just a dialect of Quenya, little changed from it, while the old Noldorin essentially became Sindarin, inheriting the phonology, grammar, and syntax that he had developed for Noldorin, whether or not they fitted their new context. Carl F. Hostetter called this a "fundamental conceptual change", noting that Sindarin has "a radically different history and by the nature of Tolkien's own process of invention a necessarily different grammar in detail than Noldorin." This means that The Etymologies encapsulate a stage in Tolkien's development of his Elvish languages which precedes that assumed in The Lord of the Rings and The Silmarillion. That in turn means, Hostetter writes, that The Etymologies cannot safely be used to draw conclusions about what "mature Sindarin" might be or for that matter what "mature Quenya" might be like.

Elvish language evolution as described in the Lhammas and assumed in The Etymologies, 1937

Elvish language evolution once Tolkien had The Lord of the Rings under development, 1938 onwards. Sindarin has replaced Noldorin. The 'new' Noldorin is just the Noldor's not very distinct dialect of Quenya.

=== Illustrations ===
Some examples may illustrate how Tolkien worked with the "bases":

- BAD- *bad- judge. Cf. MBAD-. Not in Q [Qenya]. N [Noldorin] bauð (bād-) judgement; badhor, baðron judge.
- TIR- watch, guard. Q tirin I watch, pa.t. [past tense] tirne; N tiri or tirio, pa.t. tiriant. Q tiripn watch-tower, tower. N tirith watch, guard; cf. Minnas-tirith. PQ [Primitive Quendian] *khalatirnō 'fish-watcher', N heledirn = kingfisher; Dalath Dirnen 'Guarded Plain'; Palantír 'Far-seer'.

=== Challenges in transcription ===
Detail of folio 93 of the sole manuscript of The Etymologies, showing its handwritten state, crumpled and torn, much edited with crossings-out, corrections, and marginal notes, often untidily written, and making its transcription extremely challenging and error-prone. Not struck out is the entry "√mor- *mori black" (as in Mordor, Moria), just legible mid-page. (Note: Tolkien 1987, p. 416 "mor-")

Tolkien's manuscript of The Etymologies is handwritten, with crossings-out, sometimes overwritten, scrawled, or so faint as to be almost illegible. Christopher Tolkien undertook the challenging task of transcribing it. After publication, the linguist Helge Fauskanger identified a list of probable errors in the transcription. Many of his suggestions were confirmed in 2003 and 2004, when Carl F. Hostetter and Patrick Wynne documented a substantial body of addenda and corrigenda to the published text in Vinyar Tengwar issues 45 and 46.

== Analysis ==
=== Tolkien's plans for an etymological index and historical grammars ===
With The Etymologies unpublished, Tolkien stated in a 1956 letter that his plans for the "specialist volume" of legendarium materials, which he had hoped to publish alongside The Lord of the Rings, were (Note: Carpenter 2023, #187 to H. Cotton Minchin, draft, April 1956, marked "More or less as sent 16 April")

largely linguistic. An index of names [not identical to The Etymologies] was to be produced, which by etymological interpretation would also provide quite a large Elvish vocabulary; this is of course a first requirement. I worked at it for months, and indexed the first two vols [of The Lord of the Rings]. (it was the chief cause of the delay of Vol iii) until it became clear that size and cost were ruinous.

He writes in a 1967 letter that while he is pleased that readers are so interested in the names used in The Lord of the Rings, they "often neglect" the evidence he provided in the text and the appendices. (Note: Carpenter 2023, #297 to 'Mr Rang', draft, August 1967) He mentions that he has written a "commentary on the nomenclature for the use of translators"; and

Desirable would be an onomasticon giving the meaning and derivation of all names and indicating the languages that they belong to.

Tolkien adds, in the same letter, that he would find it "agreeable" to have a "historical grammar of Quenya and Sindarin. He at once states, however, that he does not "intend to engage in these projects, until my mythology and legends are completed". In the 1956 letter already mentioned, Tolkien notes that "many [fans] want Elvish grammars, phonologies, and specimens; some want metrics and prosodies — not only of the brief Elvish specimens, but of the 'translated' verses in less familiar modes, such as those written in the strictest form of Anglo-Saxon alliterative verse (e.g. the fragment at the end of the Battle of the Pelennor, V vi 124)." In short, Tolkien was much more interested in words than in grammars. Thus The Etymologies is preoccupied with words, not with grammar: only a few Elvish phrases are included in the onomasticon.

=== Tolkien's approach ===
Elendil's name, according to The Etymologies, means 'star-lover'. Coat of arms bearing Elendil's emblems, a white tree, royal crown, and stars (Note: Tolkien 1955 book 6, ch. 6 "The Battle of the Pelennor Fields": "upon the foremost ship a great standard broke, and the wind displayed it as she turned towards the Harlond. There flowered a White Tree, and that was for Gondor; but Seven Stars were about it, and a high crown above it, the signs of Elendil that no lord had borne for years beyond count.")

The organisation of The Etymologies reflects what Tolkien did in his career as a philologist. With English words, he worked backwards from existing words to trace their origins. With Elvish he worked both backward and forward, to create "fitting names" with appropriate meanings, and to devise suitable etymologies for them in Quenya and Sindarin. In theory he would create the root first and work forwards to the word; but if the word already existed, he worked backwards from there. Christopher Robinson gives as an example Elendil, founder of the Kingdom of Arnor. His name, The Etymologies reveals, unites el, meaning 'star', plural elen, with dil, 'friend', to give the meaning of "Elendil" as 'Star-lover'.

The etymological development was always in flux as Tolkien ceaselessly tinkered with etymologies and the linguistic processes that brought about the changes from a language to its descendants. Arden Smith writes that Tolkien usually started with a detailed historical phonology of a language; then he created part of its morphology, before scrawling "a mass of incomplete notes", not bothering to move on to syntax: "by that time he would have already started revising everything from the beginning." This means, Smith comments, that Tolkien scarcely created languages with grammar and lists of words at all. Instead, he created "outlines of [the] historical development" of his languages. Smith gives as an example the Green-elves' Danian language: it consists of about "two dozen attested words" and a bit of phonological development, which indicates that its sound structure resembles that of Old English.

Christopher Tolkien called The Etymologies "a remarkable document". He stated that his father "wrote a good deal on the theory of sundokarme or 'base structure' ... but like everything else it was frequently elaborated and altered". In explanation, he wrote that his father was "more interested in the processes of change than he was in displaying the structure and use of the languages at any given time", and that "the successive phases of their intricate evolution were the delight of their creator."

=== Real-world origins ===
GAT(H)- N gath (*gattā) cavern; Doriath 'Land of the Cave' is Noldorin name for Dor. Eglador = Land of the Elves. The Ilkorins called [?themselves] Eglath = Eldar. Rest of Beleriand was called Ariador 'land outside'. N gadr, gador prison, dungeon; gathrod cave. Another name is Garthurian = Fenced Realm = N Ardholen (which was also applied to Gondolin). [Added to this later:] Dor. gad fence; argad 'outside the fence', the exterior, the outside. Cf. Argador, Falathrin Ariador. [See AR^{2}, ÉLED, ӠAR, LED.]

— The Etymologies; [material] added by Christopher Tolkien

Dimitra Fimi notes that under the root GAT(H)-, Tolkien mentions the place-name "Garthurian", meaning 'a fenced realm' such as Doriath, or the secret Elvish city of Gondolin. She comments that this seems to imply that at the time of writing The Etymologies, Tolkien still imagined the tale of Lúthien and Beren "as Celtic/Arthurian". In that case, Fimi writes, Tolkien was making a "historical pun" – given that Beleriand was originally the Arthurian-sounding Broceliand (derived from the forest of Brocéliande) – and he was obliged to work backwards from there to invent some roots that fitted.

Mark T. Hooker writes that the word-roots which Tolkien uses in The Etymologies owe something to Sanskrit, the ancient literary language of northern India. This influence may have been indirect, with much of Tolkien's direct inspiration being taken from reconstructed roots of the Proto-Indo-European language, "the kind most frequently cited in philological scholarship"—which depend considerably on Sanskrit, a major Indo-European language. Tolkien frequently denotes older roots with asterisks in accordance with the conventions of historical linguists, where they indicate reconstructed vocabulary with no historical attestation, like that of Proto-Indo-European—the "meaning-elements of an unrecorded proto-language of the distant past".

== Legacy ==
Hostetter, reflecting on half a century of Tolkienian linguistics, notes that in 1992 Anthony Appleyard used The Etymologies to attempt to systematise the grammar of Quenya for the first time. The linguist Arden R. Smith, in A Companion to J. R. R. Tolkien, calls The Etymologies "the most valuable source of Elvish vocabulary", covering "about a dozen" Elvish languages.

== Sources ==
- Appleyard, Anthony (7 March 1995). "Quenya Grammar Reexamined". Tolklang.quettar.org.
- Carpenter, Humphrey (1977). J. R. R. Tolkien: A Biography. New York: Ballantine Books. ISBN 978-0-04-928037-3.
- Carpenter, Humphrey, ed. (2023) [1981]. The Letters of J. R. R. Tolkien: Revised and Expanded Edition. New York: HarperCollins. ISBN 978-0-35-865298-4.
- Fauskanger, Helge (2004). "Probable Errors in the Etymologies". Ardalambion. Archived from the original on 18 June 1997.
- Fimi, Dimitra (2007). "Tolkien's "'Celtic' type of legends": Merging Traditions". Tolkien Studies. 4 (1): 51–71. doi:10.1353/tks.2007.0015. ISSN 1547-3163.
- Flieger, Verlyn (1983). Splintered Light: Logos and Language in Tolkien's World. Wm B. Eerdmans Publishing. ISBN 978-0-8028-1955-0.
- Garth, John (2003). Tolkien and the Great War: The Threshold of Middle-earth. HarperCollins. ISBN 978-0-00711-953-0.
- Goering, Nelson (2016). "Tolkien and Sanskrit (2016) by Mark T. Hooker". Journal of Tolkien Research (Review). 3 (3). Article 6.
- Hooker, Mark T. (2016). Tolkien and Sanskrit (2nd, expanded ed.). Createspace. ISBN 978-1-5404-3548-4.
- Hostetter, Carl F. (2006). "Elvish as She Is Spoke". In Hammond, Wayne G.; Scull, Christina (eds.). The Lord of the Rings, 1954-2004: Scholarship in Honor of Richard E. Blackwelder (PDF). Marquette University Press. pp. 231–255. ISBN 978-1-4356-1062-0.
- Hostetter, Carl F.; Wynne, Patrick H. (2003). "Addenda and Corrigenda to The Etymologies, Part one". Vinyar Tengwar (45).
- Hostetter, Carl F.; Wynne, Patrick H. (2004). "Addenda and Corrigenda to The Etymologies, Part two". Vinyar Tengwar (45).
- Hostetter, Carl F. (2007). "Tolkienian Linguistics: The First Fifty Years". Tolkien Studies. 4: 1–46. doi:10.1353/tks.2007.0022. S2CID 170601512 – via Project MUSE., also at Academia.edu
- Robinson, Christopher L. (2013). "What Makes the Names of Middle-earth So Fitting? Elements of Style in the Namecraft of JRR Tolkien". Names. 61 (2): 65–74. doi:10.1179/0027773812Z.00000000040.
- Shippey, Tom (2001). J. R. R. Tolkien: Author of the Century. HarperCollins. pp. 228–231. ISBN 978-0261-10401-3.
- Smith, Arden R. (2020) [2014]. "Invented Languages and Writing Systems". In Lee, Stuart D. (ed.). A Companion to J. R. R. Tolkien. Wiley-Blackwell. pp. 202–214. ISBN 978-1-119-65602-9.
- Tolkien, J. R. R. (1955). The Return of the King. The Lord of the Rings. Boston: Houghton Mifflin. OCLC 519647821.
- Tolkien, J. R. R. (1987). Christopher Tolkien (ed.). The Lost Road and Other Writings. Boston: Houghton Mifflin. ISBN 0-395-45519-7.
