= Grammar of late Quenya =

Grammatical rules of late Quenya

Quenya is a constructed language devised by J. R. R. Tolkien, and used in his fictional universe, Middle-earth. Here is presented a resume of the grammar of late Quenya as established from Tolkien's writings c. 1951–1973. It is almost impossible to extrapolate the morphological rules of the Quenya tongue from published data because Quenya is a fictional and irregular language that was heavily influenced by natural languages, such as Finnish and Latin, not an international auxiliary language with a regular morphology.

Tolkien wrote several synchronic grammars of Quenya, describing its state at specific moments during its development, but only one has been published in full: The Early Qenya Grammar. (Note: J.R.R. Tolkien, Carl F. Hostetter, and Bill Welden. 23 December 2003. The Early Qenya Grammar, Parma Eldalamberon 14, pp. 37-88) Apart from that, he wrote several diachronic studies of Quenya and its proto-language Common Eldarin, three of which have been published: The Qenyaqetsa (dealing with early Qenya or Eldarissa), the Outline of Phonetic Development, and the Outline of Phonology.

Late Quenya is a highly inflected language, in which nouns have ten cases and there is a rather regular inflection of verbs. Although the word order is highly flexible, the usual structure is subject–verb–object.

== Evolution ==
The Tolkien scholars Christopher Gilson and Patrick Wynne explore the evolution of Elvish grammar, stating that the Elvish languages including Quenya "form an expanding canvas" that grew during Tolkien's career. In the last stages of this external development, Tolkien imagined a diglossic Elven society with a vernacular language for daily use, "the 'colloquial' form of the language", (Note: J.R.R. Tolkien, annotated by Christopher Gilson. "Words, Phrases and Passages", Parma Eldalamberon 17, p. 76.) called Tarquesta High-tongue, and a more formal and conservative language for use in ceremonies and lore, Parmaquesta or Book-language, "which was originally the spoken language of the Noldor of Túna as it was at approximately period V.Y. 1300". (Note: J.R.R. Tolkien, "Outline of Phonology", Parma Eldalamberon 19, p. 68.) Tolkien envisaged that Quenya evolved, internally within Middle-earth, following regular laws or linguistic principles, and that languages, even if different, could interrelate.

== Nouns ==
=== Numbers ===
In late Quenya nouns can have up to four numbers: singular, general plural (or plural 1), particular/partitive plural (or plural 2), and dual.

In late Quenya Tarquesta, the plural is formed by a suffix to the subjective form of the noun.

For plural 1, the suffix is -i or -r (depending on the type of the noun). In Parmaquesta the -í is (not always) long (the precise rules have not yet been published).
For plural 2, the suffix is -li (-lí in Parmaquesta).

"Thus in Quenya Eldar (not with article!) = Elves, The Elves, All Elves; i Eldar = (all) the Elves previously named (and in some cases distinguished from other creatures); but Eldali, Elves, some Elves. With Eldali the definite article is seldom used," (Note: J.R.R. Tolkien, "Common Eldarin: Noun Structure", Parma Eldalamberon 21, p. 73.)

Not all nouns can have all four numbers since some of them are pluralia tantum having no singular variant for referring to a single object, such as armar (goods; things for sale, or the things that you own); some other nouns, especially monosyllabic ones, use only one of the two plurals judged the most aesthetic by Elves (i.e., Tolkien); with the word má 'hand' "the only plural in use (at any recorded period) was máli". (Note: J.R.R. Tolkien, "The words for 'hand", Vinyar Tengwar 47, p. 6.) The word tó 'wool' has no dual or plural, according to Tolkien. (Note: J.R.R. Tolkien, "Declension of Nouns", Parma Eldalamberon 21, p. 40.)

Tarquesta
Singular		Pl. 1		Pl. 2	
lasse	'leaf'	lassi	'leaves'	lasseli	'some/several/a number of leaves' (Note: J.R.R. Tolkien, annotated by Christopher Gilson. "Words, Phrases and Passages", Parma Eldalamberon 17, p. 63.)
alda	'tree'	aldar	'trees'	aldali	'some/several/a number of trees'
Elda	'Elf'	Eldar	'Elves (as a kind)'	Eldali	'some/a lot of Elves' (Note: J.R.R. Tolkien, "Words, Phrases and Passages", Parma Eldalamberon 17, p. 135.)

=== Noun declension ===
Quenya nouns are declined, having cases that often resemble those of Finnish. Declining is the process of inflecting nouns; a set of declined forms of the same word is called a declension. Parmaquesta has ten cases (including short variants). These include the four primary cases: nominative, accusative, genitive, and instrumental; three adverbial cases: allative (of which the dative is a shortened form), locative (also with a shortened form), and ablative; and an adjectival case.

Primary cases:

- The nominative is the subject of a verb. It is also used with most prepositions.
- The accusative is the direct object of a verb. It has the same form as the nominative in Tarquesta, but is distinct in Ancient Quenya and in Parmaquesta.
- The genitive is mainly used to mark origin (e.g. the best painters of France). Its usage sometimes overlaps the ablative, sometimes the adjectival.
- The instrumental marks a noun as a means or instrument.

Adverbial cases:

- The allative expresses motion towards: elenna, 'toward a star, starward(s)'.
- The dative is the indirect object of a verb.
- The locative expresses location or position: Lóriendesse, 'in Lórien'.
- The ablative expresses motion away from: earello, 'from the sea'.

Adjectival case:

- The adjectival case describes qualities, and turns almost any noun into an adjective. It is also used to indicate possession or ownership. In Tarquesta, this usage sometimes overlaps with the genitive.

The declension of the noun in Parmaquesta has been published in the so-called "Plotz Declension" that Tolkien provided in a letter to Dick Plotz in 1967. (Note: J.R.R. Tolkien, Letter to Dick Plotz, 1967. First published in the fanzine Beyond Bree in March 1989.) This provides the "classical" declension of two vocalic-stem nouns cirya "ship" and lassë "leaf", in four numbers: singular, pl. 1, pl. 2, and dual. The declension has eight chief cases in three groups that Tolkien labelled a, b, and c. Of these cases, Tolkien named only

1. the primary cases: nominative, accusative, genitive, and instrumental; and,
2. the adverbial cases: allative, locative, and ablative.

The allative and locative in turn have (unnamed) short forms (except in the loc. dual), of which the short allative form appears to correspond to the dative case. The third group, c, has only one member (and only in singular and in plural 2), which appears to correspond to the adjectival case as described in the essay "Quendi and Eldar – Essekenta Eldarinwa" written in c. 1960.

The declension of cirya and lasse given below is taken from the Plotz Declension and reflects the forms of Classical Quenya. The declensions of ondo "stone", nér "man", and cas "head" are taken from an earlier conceptual period of Quenya (c. 1935). (Note: J.R.R. Tolkien. Parma Eldalamberon 16, p. 113–115)

Singular	cirya	lassë	ondo	nér	cas
Nominative	cirya	lassë	ondo	nér	cas
Accusative	ciryá	lassé	ondo	nera	cara
Genitive	ciryo	lassëo	ondo	nero	caro
Instrumental	ciryanen	lassenen	ondoinen	nerinen	carinen
Allative	ciryanna	lassenna	ondonta	nerta	casta
Dative	ciryan	lassen	ondor	neren	caren
Locative	ciryassë	lassessë	ondosse	nerissë	casse
Short Locative	ciryas	lasses	ondos	neris	cas
Ablative	ciryallo	lassello	ondollo	nerullo	callo, carullo
Adjectival	ciryava	lasseva	ondova	nerwa	carwa

Plural 1	cirya	lassë
Nominative	ciryar	lassí
Accusative	ciryai	lassí
Genitive	ciryaron	lassion
Instrumental	ciryainen	lassínen
Allative	ciryannar	lassennar
Dative	ciryain	lassin
Locative	ciryassen	lassessen
Short Locative	ciryais	lassis
Ablative	ciryallon	lassellon

Plural 2	cirya	lassë	ondo	nér	cas
Nominative	ciryalí	lasselí	ondoli	?	cari
Accusative	ciryalí	lasselí	ondoli	?	?
Genitive	ciryalion	lasselion	ondolion	?	?
Instrumental	ciryalínen	lasselínen	ondolínen	?	?
Allative	ciryalinna(r)	lasselinna(r)	ondolinta(n)	?	?
Dative	ciryalin	lasselin	ondolir	?	?
Locative	ciryalisse(n)	lasselisse(n)	ondolissen	?	?
Short Locative	ciryalis	lasselis	?	?	?
Ablative	ciryalillo(n)	lasselillo(n)	ondolillon	?	?
Adjectival	ciryalíva	lasselíva	?	?	?

Dual	cirya	lassë	ondo	nér	cas
Nominative	ciryat	lasset	ondos	nerut	carut
Accusative	ciryat	lasset	ondos	nerut	carut
Genitive	ciryato	lasseto	ondu	neru	caru
Instrumental	ciryanten	lassenten	ondoinent	?	?
Allative	ciryanta	lassenta	ondontas	?	?
Dative	ciryant	lassent	ondur	nerur	carur
Locative	ciryatsë	lassetsë	ondoset	?	?
Ablative	ciryalto	lasselto	ondollut	?	?

== Adjectives ==
According to Tolkien, adjectives appear only in -a, -e, -o (rare), and -n (stem nearly always -nd); melin "dear", pl. melindi.

Quenya adjectives may be freely used as nouns. (Note: J.R.R. Tolkien, "early Qenya Grammar", Parma Eldalamberon, 14, p. 77.)

=== Comparison ===
The comparative forms of adjectives are in late Quenya normally expressed by the use of the preposition lá, much as in French plus: (Note: J.R.R. Tolkien, annotated by Christopher Gilson. "Comparative in Eldarin", Parma Eldalamberon, 17, pp. 90–91.)

A (ná) calima lá B. "A is brighter than B."
French: A est plus brillant que B.

Note that the use of the copula ná, when in the present tense, is optional.

Some adjectives are irregular. The following table provides the comparative and superlative forms of the adjective mára "good":

Positive	Comparative	Superlative
(good)	(better)	(best)
mára	arya	i arya + gen. case

A (ná) arya B. "A is better than B."

=== Agreement ===
An adjective in Quenya agrees with the noun it describes as regards number, but in general not with respect to case. In other words, the adjectives have specific plural forms, which are used if the corresponding noun is in (ordinary) plural. On the other hand, the case of the noun in general does not influence the form of the adjective.

The historical plural ending for adjectives is -i. However, in late Quenya, adjectives ending in -a instead have this -a replaced by -ë. Moreover, the adjective laurëa ("golden") there has the plural form laurië (in laurië lantar lassi, literary "golden fall (the) leaves", which in singular would have been *'laurëa lanta lassë', "golden falls (the) leaf").

In general, just the noun or pronoun, but not any accompanying adjectives, take case endings. However, sometimes, a case ending on a group consisting of a noun followed by an adjective attribute may be put on the adjective instead of on the noun, as in Elendil vorondo voronwe, "Elendil the faithful's fidelity"; compare this with the noun phrase possessive construction in modern English. The nominative of "Elendil the faithful" would be Elendil voronda.

== Verbs ==
According to Tolkien's own terminology, Quenya verbs are either in a personal form or an impersonal form. Usually in linguistics, an impersonal verb is a verb that cannot take a true subject, because it does not represent an action, occurrence, or state-of-being of any specific person, place, or thing. This is not how Tolkien used the term "impersonal". An impersonal verb form is a verb to which no pronoun is attached, as care or carir; carin "I do" is a personal form (-n).

The impersonal conjugations provided below were written by J.R.R. Tolkien in the late 1960s, (Note: J.R.R. Tolkien, annotated by Christopher Gilson. Parma Eldalamberon, 17, p. 77 for henta- and p. 144 for car-) but only in singular forms. There are apparently two main types of verbs in late Quenya: weak transitive verbs, which are usually 'root' verbs, such as car- "make; do" from the Elvish base or root KAR-, and derivative intransitive verbs with a strong conjugation, whose stems end mainly in -ta, -na, -ya, formed by putting a verbal suffix to a base or root, like henta- "to eye", from the Elvish base KHEN- "eye".

	Derivative verb (strong)		Root verb (weak)	
	Singular	Plural	Singular	Plural
Stem	henta-		car-	
Aorist	henta	hentar	carë (cari-)	carir
Present	hentëa	hentëar	cára	cárar
Past	hentanë	hentaner	carnë	carner
Future	hentuva	hentuvar	caruva	caruvar
Perfect	ehentië	ehentier	acárië	acárier
Gerund	hentië	hentier	cárië	cárier

=== Irregular verbs ===
Some Quenya verbs have irregular conjugations. The verb auta- comes from the root AWA-, meaning "depart, go away, disappear, be lost, pass away". (Note: J.R.R. Tolkien annotated by Christopher Gilson. Parma Eldalamberon, 17, p. 63.) This verb is used in a sentence in the chapter "Of the Fifth Battle" in The Silmarillion: "Auta i lómë! The night is passing!".

	Mixed conjugation	
	Singular	Plural
Stem	auta-, av-, va- (< wa-)	
Aorist	ava	avar
Present	avëa, auta	avëar, autar
Past	vánë (< wánë), avantë	váner (< wáner), avanter
Future	auva, autuva	auvar, autuvar
Perfect	(a)vánië	(a)vánier

=== Negation of verbs ===
As explained by Tolkien, (Note: J.R.R. Tolkien, annotated by Christopher Gilson. Parma Eldalamberon 17, p. 144.) verbs in Quenya are negated by prefacing a "negative verb" ua- (not marked for tense) to the impersonal form of the same tense:

Negation of verb car-
	Quenya	English	Quenya		English
Aorist	carin	I make	uan / uin carë		I do not make
Present	cáran	I am making	uan cára	uan carë	I am not making
Past	carnen	I made	uan carnë	únen carë	I did not make
Future	caruvan	I shall make	uan caruva	úvan carë	I shall not make
Perfect	acáriën	I have made	uan acárië	uien carë	I have not made

Note that the pronoun is added on the negative verb, not on the main verb, and that the endings are regular. The negative verb concept was apparently borrowed from Finnish.

In Parmaquesta (and in verse) the verb ua- could be completely conjugated.

=== Moods ===
In late Quenya moods (other than the indicative) are expressed by particles, a short function word that does not belong to any of the inflected grammatical word classes:

a and á for the imperative mood: A laita te! "Bless them!", Á hyame rámen! "Pray for us!".

The Present Imperative of the verb auta-, cited above, is á va usually written áva as in Áva márië! "Go (away) happily!".

The prohibitive mood negates the imperative mood. The two moods have in late Quenya distinct verbal morphology. In late Quenya prohibition is expressed by the particle áva.

Áva carë! "Don’t do it! Don't make it!"
Á carë! "Do it!"

When used alone, the particle is avá (sometimes ává, with two long as) meaning: "Don't!" (I forbid you to do as you intend). (Note: J.R.R. Tolkien, annotated by Christopher Gilson. "DLN", Parma Eldalamberon 17, p. 143.)

Nai is used for the optative mood:

nai tiruvantes.

Other particles like ce, cé are used in the corpus of published Quenya texts, but their precise functions are not known from any of Tolkien's published linguistic papers.

=== Agreement ===
The plural forms (suffix -r in late Quenya) are used only with a detached plural subject. "When the emphatic pronoun is used separately the verb has no inflexion (save for number)". (Note: J.R.R. Tolkien, annotated by Christopher Gilson. Parma Eldalamberon 17, p. 76.)

Finwë carë. 'Finwë is making'.
A ar B carir. 'A and B are making'.
Quendi carir. 'The Elves are making'.
Carinyë. 'I am making'.
Elyë carë. 'He/She is (really) making'.
Emme carir. 'We are (really) making'.

Late Quenya verbs have also a dual agreement morpheme -t:

Nai siluvat elen atta. "May two stars shine." (Note: Vinyar Tengwar, 49, p. 43.)

In the imperative mood plurality and duality are not expressed. There is no agreement. The verb stays singular. (Note: J.R.R. Tolkien, annotated by Christopher Gilson. "Words, Phrases and Passages", Parma Eldalamberon 17, pp. 93–94.) If a plural verb is used as in Á carir it means "let them do it" referring to persons not present or at any rate not addressed directly.

=== Copula ===
The copula in late Quenya is the verb na-. Tolkien stated that it was used only in joining adjectives, nouns, and pronouns in statements (or wishes) asserting (or desiring) a thing to have certain quality, or to be same as another, and also that the copula was not used when the meaning was clear. (Note: Vinyar Tengwar 49, p. 9.)

Eldar ataformaiti can be translated as either "Elves are ambidexters" or "Elves were ambidexters". (Note: J.R.R. Tolkien. Vinyar Tengwar, 49, p. 7.)
A mára. "A is good" or "A was good".

	Copula		Exist (have being)	
	Singular	Plural	Singular	Plural
Stem	na-		ëa-	
Aorist	na	nar	ëa	ëar
Present	ná	nár	ëa	ëar
Past	né	ner	engë	enger
Future	nauva	nauvar	euva	euvar
Perfect	anaië	anaier	engië	engier

The existential aorist/present form ëa is also used as a noun (with a capital E) as the Quenya name for the Universe, Eä 'that which is'.

== Prepositions and adverbs ==
In Quenya, there are many similarities in form between prepositions and adverbs since the grammatical case already determines the relation of verb and object. Many Quenya prepositions have adverb-like uses with no complement. In Common Eldarin, these prepositions were postpositions instead, and later became inflectional endings. Case markings combine primarily with nouns, whereas prepositions can combine with phrases of many different categories. This is why most prepositions in Quenya are used with a noun in the nominative case.

an i falmali = i falmalinna(r) "upon the many waves"

The preposition an is related to the -nna case ending.

=== Conjugated prepositions ===
Quenya has a conjugated preposition formed from the contraction of a preposition with a personal pronoun.

ótar "(together) with you (Sir or Mam)", and ótari "(together) with you (Milords or Miladies)". (Note: J.R.R. Tolkien. Vinyar Tengwar, 43, p. 29)
rámen "for us".

== Pronouns ==
As with all parts of Quenya grammar, the pronominal system was subject to many revisions throughout Tolkien's life. The following table of late Quenya is taken from two sources of c. 1965–1973, and does not reflect the pronominal system as it stood when Tolkien invented "Qenya" around 1910, which was the early Qenya.

In late Quenya, pronouns have both separate or independent forms, and suffix forms. One source is used for the stressed separate pronouns, (Note: "Quenya Pronominal Elements", in Vinyar Tengwar, 49, p. 51.) the other for the rest of the table. (Note: J.R.R. Tolkien, annotated by Christopher Gilson. Parma Eldalamberon, 17, p. 57.)

Early Noldorin Quenya Forms		Long subjective	Short subjective	Separate	Possessive	English
Sg.	1st	-nye	-n	ní	-nya	I
Sg.	2nd imperious / familiar	-tye	–	tyé	-tya	(thou)
Sg.	2nd formal / polite	-lye	–	lyé	-lya	you
Sg.	3rd animate	-se	-s	sé	-rya/-ya	he, she
Sg.	3rd inanimate	-sa	-s	sá	-rya/-ya	it
Sg.	Impersonal agreement	nil	–	–	nil	
Du.	1st pers. dual inclusive	-ngwe/-nque	–	wet	-nqua	you and I, us two (you)
Du.	1st exclusive	-mme/-nwe	–	met	-mma	(s)he and I, us two (not you)
Du.	2nd imperious / familiar	-xë/-ccë	–	tyet	-xa/-cca	you two
Du.	2nd formal / polite	-llë/-stë	–	let	-lla	both of you
Du.	3rd	-sto/-ttë	–	tú	-twa	those two
Du.	Impersonal agreement	+-t	–	–	+-t	
Pl.	1st inclusive	-lwe/lve	–	wé/vé	-lwa/-lva	we (including you)
Pl.	1st exclusive	-lme	–	mé	-lma	we (not including you)
Pl.	2nd imperious / familiar	-nce	–	(?)	-nca	you lot, you guys, youse, y'all
Pl.	2nd formal / polite	-lde/-lle	–	lé	-lda/-lla	you
Pl.	3rd animate	-ntë	–	té	-nta	they
Pl.	3rd inanimate	-nta	–	sa^{1}	-nta	they
Pl.	Impersonal agreement	+ -r	–	–	+ -r	

1. Printed sa in the source, it is probably a casual error for sá. But te, not té, was used by the Gondorians: cf. a laita te in The Lord of the Rings. Maybe both forms (sa, sá; té, te) could both be used in Low Quenya.

The separate pronouns have both a short (lyé, sé, mé) and long form (elye, emme, esse, elwe). Evidence from the published corpus suggests that long separate forms were intensive pronouns, a complete list of which has not been published yet. Tolkien named them "emphatic disjunct pronouns", while short independent pronouns could normally be used in place of enclitic ones.

"I love him" (or "her") can be expressed in Quenya as Melinyes or Melin sé. (Note: J.R.R. Tolkien, Vinyar Tengwar, 49, p. 15.) "I love them" would be then Melinyet or Melin té (these two forms are reconstructed). As with regular nouns, Quenya lacks a distinction between nominative and accusative case, so the same direct case is used for both; melin is the first person singular form of the verb, making it clear that té is the object and not the subject.

The verbal inflexions are subjective but an -s (singular) and a -t (plural and dual) may be added to the long subjective pronouns as objectives of the 3rd person: (Note: J.R.R. Tolkien, annotated by Christopher Gilson. "Words, Phrases and Passages in Various Tongues in The Lord of the Rings", Parma Eldalamberon 17, p. 110.)

utúvie-lye-s, "You have found it/him/her".
utúvie-lye-t, "You have found them".

=== Noldorin dialect ===
In the internal development of the language, similar to English, Dutch, and Portuguese, the second person familiar was abandoned in colloquial Noldorin Quenya before the Exile, (see T-V distinction). The following forms became obsolete:

-tye, -nce, -xe, -cce
-tya, -nca, -xa, -cca
tyé, tyet

The ancient polite forms became used in an ordinary context, and so, perhaps at the time when Fëanor was banished from Tirion, a new honorific form was created in Late Noldorin Quenya by adding tar, the Quenya word for sir and madam. (Note: J.R.R. Tolkien, annotated by Christopher Gilson. Parma Eldalamberon, 17, p. 58.)

Carilye tar, "you do, sir", became Cariltar.

=== Possessive determiners ===
The possessive determiners (analogous to English my, his, etc.) are used to indicate the possessor of the noun they determine. They mark the person and number of the possessor, and are inflected to agree with the noun they are attached in number and case. While the English language distinguishes between masculine and feminine singular possessors (his vs. her), late Quenya does not. As in English, possessive determiners do not necessarily express true possession.

Their forms in Early colloquial Noldorin Quenya are as follows: (Note: J.R.R. Tolkien, annotated by Christopher Gilson. Parma Eldalamberon 17, p. 57.)

Possessives			Possessed		
Possessives			Singular	Dual	Plural
Possessor	1st	Sg.	-(i)nya^{1}	-(i)nyat	-(i)nyar
Possessor	1st	Du.	-(e)nqua, -(e)mma	-(e)nquat, -(e)mmat	-(e)nquar, -(e)mmar
Possessor	1st	Pl.	-(e)lwa/-(e)lva, -(e)lma^{2}	-(e)lwat/-(e)lvat, -(e)lmat	-(e)lwar/-(e)/lvar, -(e)lmar
Possessor	2nd	Sg.	-tya, -lya	-tyat, -lyat	-tyar, -lyar
Possessor	2nd	Du.	-xa, -cca, -lla	-xat, -ccat, -llat	-xar, -ccar, -llar
Possessor	2nd	Pl.	-nca, -lda, -lla	-ncat, -ldat, -llat	-ncar, -ldar, -llar
Possessor	3rd	Sg.	-rya, -ya	-ryat, -yat	-ryar, -yar
Possessor	3rd	Du.	-twa	-twat	-twar
Possessor	3rd	Pl.	-nta	-ntat	-ntar

1. The i forms, -inya, are used with consonantal nouns: atar, atarinya 'my father'.
2. The e forms, -emma, are used with consonantal nouns: atar, ataremma 'our father'.

"Since by Quenya idiom in describing the parts of body of several persons the number proper to each individual is used, the plural of parts existing in pairs (as hands, eyes, ears, feet) is seldom required. Thus mánta "their hand" would be used, (they raised) their hands (one each), mántat, (they raised) their hands (each both), and mánte could not occur". (Note: J.R.R. Tolkien, annotated by Christopher Gilson. Parma Eldalamberon, 17, p. 161.)

Ortanentë mánta. They raised their hands.
Ortaner mánta. They raised their hands.
Varda ortanë máryat. Varda has uplifted her (two) hands. (Note: From the Namárië poem by J.R.R. Tolkien.)

So far, according to the published corpus of Quenya texts, mánte is the sole possessive determiner with a plural ending in -ë (< -ai). The usual plural ending is -r, hildinyar, "my heirs". This was probably an older device from Parmaquesta.

== Syntax ==
Quenya allows for a very flexible word order because it is an inflectional language like Latin. Nevertheless, it has word order rules. The usual structure is subject–verb–object.

Tolkien explained in his grammar of Common Eldarin the use of the adjective in late Quenya:

"Adjectives normally preceded the qualified noun, and in attributive use were seldom separated from it by other words or elements. A standing exception was made by numerals which usually immediately followed the noun. They [the preceding adjectives, not numerals] in fact made "loose compounds" with the qualified noun, and only the qualified noun was inflected. In Quenya attributive adjectives are inflected for number only, if they precede their nouns. If they follow, the situation is reversed. Thus Sindar Eldar, Grey Elves, or Eldar sindar (abnormal order, only permitted in verse). But Sinda Eldo, a Grey Elf's, Sindar Eldaron, Grey Elves', or (abnormally) Eldar sindaron". (Note: J.R.R. Tolkien, annotated by Christopher Gilson. Common Eldarin: Noun Structure. in Parma Eldalamberon, n° 21, p. 77.)
