= The Etymologies =

The Etymologies may refer to:

- The Etymologies (Tolkien), a 1930s word-list for his Elvish languages
- Etymologiae, also called The Etymologies, written by Isidore of Seville, c. 625 AD
