= The Song of Middle Earth =

1985 book by David Harvey

- Author: David Harvey
- Language: English
- Publisher: HarperCollins
- Publication date: 1985
- Publication place: United Kingdom

The Song of Middle Earth: J. R. R. Tolkien’s Themes, Symbols and Myths is a book by David Harvey, published in 1985.

== Plot summary ==
The Song of Middle Earth contends that Tolkien's work is more original than critics have claimed, and that Tolkien in his work was trying to create a modern mythology for England.

== Reception ==
Dave Langford reviewed The Song of Middle Earth for White Dwarf #67, and stated that "This stodge should appeal to hobbits, who you'll remember 'liked to have books filled with things that they already knew, set out fair and square with no contradictions.'"

== Reviews ==
- Review by Chris Morgan and Pauline Morgan (1985) in Vector 127
- Review by Brian Stableford (1985) in Fantasy Review, October 1985
- Review by Mary Gentle (1985) in Interzone, #13 Autumn 1985
