= Richard Plotz =

American Tolkien scholar (1948–2024)

Richard Plotz (commonly known as Dick Plotz) (August 15, 1948 – March 2, 2024) was the founder of the Tolkien Society of America, which in 1972 was merged with the Mythopoeic Society. Plotz is known for his interview with J. R. R. Tolkien in the late 1960s under the auspices of Seventeen Magazine, and for a 1967 letter from Tolkien delineating the declension of the noun in late Quenya (the so-called "Plotz Declension"). Plotz attended Harvard University as an undergraduate.

== Sources ==
- Beyond Bree. March 1989. Newsletter of the Tolkien Special Interest Group of American Mensa. Reproduces in facsimile part of a letter to Plotz under the title "The Dick Plotz Letter: Declension of the Quenya Noun".
- Vinyar Tengwar. No. 6, July 1989. The Elvish Linguistic Fellowship. Reproduces the text of Narqelion, and includes an article "A Brief Note on the Background of the Letter from J.R.R. Tolkien to Dick Plotz Concerning the Declension of the High-elvish Noun" by Jorge Quinonez.
- Basic Quenya. Nancy Martsch. August 1992. Beyond Bree. Collects the 22 Quenya lessons previously published in Beyond Bree. Includes a facsimile reproduction of the chart of declensions of Quenya nouns sent by Tolkien to Richard Plotz in 1966/1967. Revised edition issued March 1993.
- Proceedings of the J.R.R. Tolkien Centenary Conference. Mallorn 33. Mythlore 80. 1995. The Tolkien Society / The Mythopoeic Press. The article "The Growth of Grammar in the Elven Tongues" by Christopher Gilson and Patrick Wynne reproduces the chart of declensions of Quenya nouns that Tolkien sent to Plotz in 1966/1967.
