= Finnish influences on Tolkien =

Literary influences

Finnish influences on Tolkien include both the Finnish language, which he especially liked, and the Kalevala, Elias Lönnrot's 19th century compilation of Finnish mythology, which Tolkien stated had powerfully affected him. He further stated that his invented Elvish language of Quenya was influenced by the phonology and structure of Finnish.

Scholars have identified both multiple surface-level parallels between elements and characters in the Kalevala and Tolkien's legendarium, and deeper resemblances. These began with his unfinished 1914 The Story of Kullervo, his adaptation of a section of the Kalevala. The story already displays numerous features characteristic of his Middle-earth writings. Another work from this period, "The Voyage of Éarendel the Evening Star", resembles the Kalevala's closing scene. Among the specific parallels between the Kalevala and Tolkien's writings is a magical object of great power, the Sampo, reflected in Tolkien's Silmarils and the One Ring, and perhaps also the Two Trees of Valinor. The central character of the Kalevala, Väinämöinen, too, is a wise immortal, like Tolkien's Gandalf.

Deeper matches include the process of compiling and editing: Lönnrot gathered folk stories to create his work, while Tolkien wrote frame stories to give the impression that he was an editor of ancient texts describing the mythology of England. Scholars have noted that Christopher Tolkien's subsequent redaction of his father's legendarium made this fiction into a reality, so that both men could be called England's Lönnrot. Further, Tolkien imitated the Kalevala's use of intentionally high-sounding language, stylized poetry, and the magical power of song.

== Finnish language ==
=== Intoxication with Finnish ===
Tolkien took an interest in the Finnish mythology of the Kalevala, a 19th-century work of epic poetry compiled by Elias Lönnrot. He then became acquainted with the Finnish language, which he found to provide an aesthetically pleasing inspiration for his Elvish language Quenya. Many years later, he wrote: "It was like discovering a complete wine-cellar filled with bottles of an amazing wine of a kind and flavour never tasted before. It quite intoxicated me." (Note: Carpenter 2023, #163 to W. H. Auden, 7 June 1955) and used it to construct Quenya. He began doing this in around 1910 or 1911 while he was at the King Edward's School, Birmingham. Around 1915, he named it Qenya, before changing the spelling to Quenya.

=== Inspiration for Quenya ===
Tolkien wrote that "my 'own language' [Quenya] – or series of invented languages – became heavily Finnicized in phonetic pattern and structure." On the inspiration for Quenya, he wrote that:

The ingredients in Quenya are various, but worked out into a self-consistent character not precisely like any language that I know. Finnish, which I came across when I had first begun to construct a 'mythology' was a dominant influence, but that has been much reduced [now in late Quenya]. It survives in some features: such as the absence of any consonant combinations initially, the absence of the voiced stops b, d, g (except in mb, nd, ng, ld, rd, which are favoured) and the fondness for the ending -inen, -ainen, -oinen, also in some points of grammar, such as the inflexional endings -sse (rest at or in), -nna (movement to, towards), and -llo (movement from); the personal possessives are also expressed by suffixes; there is no gender. (Note: From a letter to W. R. Matthews, dated 13–15 June 1964, published in Parma Eldalamberon (17), p. 135.)

The Lutheran priest Petri Tikka analyses the languages in the Arda Philology journal, showing that they are genuinely diverse, and arguing that the "Finnicization" of Quenya did not decline during its development through Tolkien's lifetime. He notes that Tolkien rarely borrowed words directly from Finnish, but absorbed linguistic patterns and used them to create a language that has "an atmosphere of both uniqueness and depth". Among the direct resemblances, adjectives in both Finnish and early Qenya agree grammatically with the nouns that they qualify in case and in number. In terms of phonology, Tikka notes that Quenya does not share the distinctive front vowels ä, ö, and y of Finnish, so it does not seem obviously Finnish to native speakers. He comments that this illustrates Tolkien's desire to make his languages both original and deeply-rooted in reality.

Comparison of Quenya with Finnish
Feature	Finnish	Quenya
Front vowels	ä, ö, y	(missing)
Words can begin with consonant groups	no	no
Voiced stops b, d, g missing except in mb, nd, ng, ld, rd	yes	yes
Favoured endings -inen, -ainen, -oinen	yes	yes
Inflectional endings -sse, -nne, -llo	yes	yes
Possessive affixes	yes	yes
Use of gender	no	no

The fantasy author Anne C. Petty likens the beauty of Tolkien's Tengwar calligraphy to the effect of "printed Finnish with its limited number of consonants and doubled, umlauted vowels". She gives as an example some intentionally untranslated lines from the Kalevala, including "Polvin maasta ponnistihe, / käsivarsin käännältihe..."

== Kalevala ==
=== Germ of Tolkien's legendarium ===
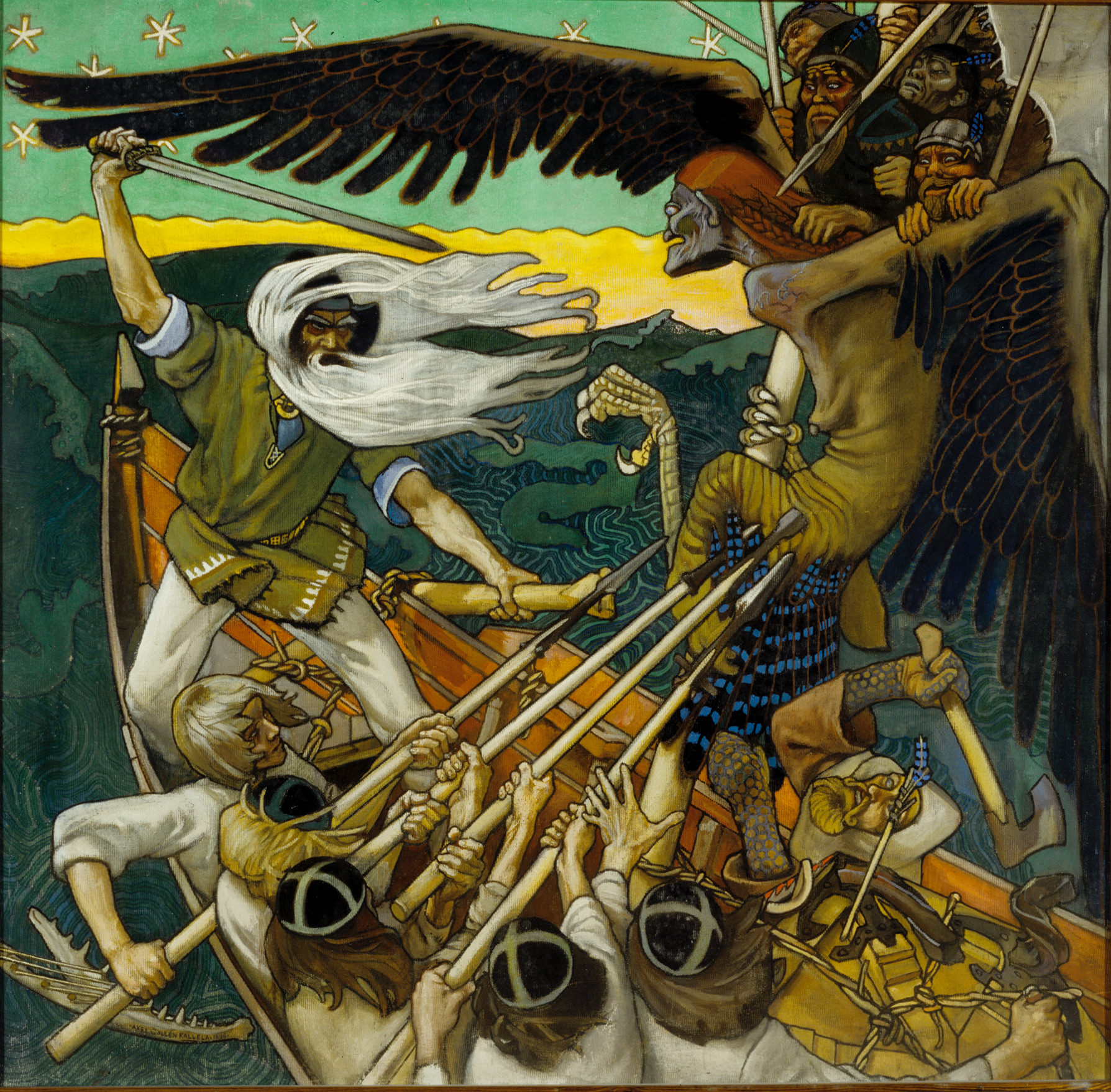
Tolkien may have made use of the Finnish epic poem Kalevala for some Middle-earth characters. Painting: The Defense of the Sampo, an adaptation of a scene from Kalevala, by Akseli Gallen-Kallela, 1896

Tolkien was "greatly affected", (Note: Carpenter 2023, #131 to Milton Waldman, late 1951) indeed "fascinated by", the Kalevala, especially the tale of Kullervo, and used aspects of it in his Middle-earth writings. He credited Kullervo's story for getting him started on his legendarium: "the germ of my attempt to write legends of my own to fit my private languages was the tragic tale of the hapless Kullervo in the Finnish Kalevala". (Note: Carpenter 2023, #257 to Christopher Bretherton, 16 July 1964) He stated in another letter that he was "immensely attracted by something in the air of the Kalevala, even in [the entomologist and folklorist] Kirby's poor translation." He started reworking the story of Kullervo into a story of his own in 1914, but never finished it. (Note: Carpenter 2023, #1 to Edith Bratt, October 1914, footnote 6) However, similarities to the story can still be seen in the tale of Túrin Turambar. Each is a tragic hero who accidentally commits incest with his sister, who, upon finding out, kills herself by leaping into water. Each hero later kills himself after asking his sword if it will slay him, which it confirms. As late as 1964, Tolkien was still strongly attracted by the Kalevala, naming The Children of Húrin as a product of that interest.

The Tolkien scholar Verlyn Flieger, publishing Tolkien's unfinished short story, The Story of Kullervo and the two drafts of his essay "On the Kalevala", writes that they demonstrate "just how powerful" an effect the Finnish work had "on his imagination and his legendarium." The short story, surviving in a single 1914 draft and note pages, and probably never revisited, was based on runes 31–36 of the Kalevala. Flieger ascribes Tolkien's 1944 comment that "Finnish ... was the original germ of the Silmarillion" (Note: Carpenter 2023, #75 to Christopher Tolkien, 7 July 1944) to this story. She notes the Tolkien linguist Carl F. Hostetter's observation that some names in the story "echo or prefigure" his first versions of Qenya. Thus the god-names Ilu and Ilukko resemble the Ilúvatar of The Silmarillion; the placename Telea (for Karelia) "evokes the Teleri"; and Manalome (sky, heaven) "recall[s] Qenya Mana/Manwë, chief of the Valar".

Petty and Tolkien's biographer John Garth have noted the similarity of Tolkien's 1914 poem "The Voyage of Éarendel the Evening Star", in which the far-travelled mariner finally sails from the earth's surface into the sky, to the Kalevala's closing scene, where the work's central character, Väinämöinen, "In his vessel made of copper, / Sailed away to loftier regions, / To the land beneath the heavens." Garth calls the resemblance "especially pertinent" since Tolkien wrote the poem while "immersed" in the Kalevala and was in the process of writing his Story of Kullervo. In Garth's opinion, Tolkien was "attracted by the knotty confusions and illogical omissions in the Kalevala", as "he wanted to fix the discontinuities and fill in the gaps. The urge is entirely characteristic of Tolkien." Among the changes that Tolkien made from Kirby's version to his own short story are "more cogent motivations", "flourishes of vivid detail", removal of "sing-song repetitions"; reorganisation; reduction of the cast of characters; and toning down of the "wilder hyperbole". Garth adds that The Story of Kullervo is where some "characteristically Tolkienian features" make their debut: it is heroic "with famous and superhuman deeds", but "also sub-heroic, involving a clumsy and sometimes stupid protagonist." Further, it makes use of "supernatural folklore elements" including "prophecy, an inherited weapon, a magical gift (three hairs—a triadic grouping repeated by Galadriel), and even trees as shepherds (portending the Ents)".

=== The magical Sampo ===
Like The Lord of the Rings, the Kalevala centres around a magical item of great power, the Sampo, which bestows great fortune on its owner, but whose exact nature is never made clear; it has been considered a World pillar (Axis mundi) among other possibilities. Scholars including Randel Helms have suggested that the Sampo contributed to Tolkien's magical forged jewels, the Silmarils that form a central element of his legendarium. Jonathan Himes has suggested further that Tolkien found the Sampo complex, and chose to split the Sampo's parts into desirable objects. The pillar, in his view, became the Two Trees of Valinor with their tree of life aspect, illuminating the world, while its decorated lid became the brilliant Silmarils, embodying all that was left of the light of the Two Trees, thus tying the symbols together.

Like the One Ring, the magical token at the centre of The Lord of the Rings, the Sampo is fought over by forces of good and evil, and is ultimately lost to the world when it is destroyed towards the end of the story. Väinämöinen and the powerful wizard Gandalf share their immortal origins and wise nature; and both works end with the character's departure on a ship to lands beyond the mortal world. Other critics have identified similarities between Väinämöinen and the spirit of the countryside, Tom Bombadil, both of whom wield their power through song.

=== Multiple Kalevala-like features ===
The scholar of literature Matthew R. Bardowell argues in Journal of the Fantastic in the Arts that while there are multiple surface-level matches between elements and characters in Tolkien's legendarium and the Kalevala, these are not sufficient to explain Tolkien's evident enthusiasm for the work, nor to accommodate his claim in On Fairy-Stories that the process of mythopoiesis is far more organic. Tolkien is quoted as saying in Humphrey Carpenter's biography that a story "grows like a seed in the dark out of the leaf-mold of the mind: out of all that has been seen or thought or read, that has long ago been forgotten, descending into the deeps. No doubt there is much selection, as with a gardener: what one throws on one's personal compost-heap". Bardowell suggests that Tolkien was indeed affected in depth by the Kalevala, and that its influence, rather than being seen in surface features, is woven right into the fabric of his legendarium.

Petty likens the way that the Middle-earth expert and editor Christopher Tolkien redacted his father's legendarium to Lönnrot's editing of Finland's mythology, thus helping to make the work a genuine "mythology for England". She comments that J. R. R. Tolkien had made use of frame stories in which a "scholar-scribe" had mediated the supposedly ancient narratives and other records, so Christopher's intervention, "life imitating art", made the legendarium more like the Kalevala, with both father and son fulfilling parts of Lönnrot's role. In addition, she comments that Tolkien imitated the Kalevala's "epic register" of high language. Tolkien was influenced, too, Petty writes, by many features of the Kalevala:

Anne C. Petty's analysis of features of the Kalevala in Tolkien's legendarium
Kalevala feature	Legendarium
Cosmological runes	Ainulindalë
Doomed lovers	Beren and Lúthien, Túrin and Finduilas
Fate of world in magical object	Silmarils, the One Ring
Groups of episodic stories	Quenta Silmarillion
Archetypal characters	Gandalf as wise shaman; Morgoth as God of the underworld
Stylized poetry	"repetition, redundancy, epithets, the power of three"
Own native language	Quenya in its changing forms
Magical power of song	e.g. Yavanna sings Two Trees of Valinor into being; Lúthien conquers Angband
Landscape with islands, inland waterways	Middle-earth, Númenor

== Sources ==
- Carpenter, Humphrey, ed. (2023) [1981]. The Letters of J. R. R. Tolkien: Revised and Expanded Edition. New York: HarperCollins. ISBN 978-0-35-865298-4.
