= Arden R. Smith =

American linguist

- Born: November 12, 1964 (age 61); California, U.S.
- Education: University of California, Berkeley
- Known for: Editing of J. R. R. Tolkien's linguistic manuscripts; Deciphering of Tengwar and Cirth texts; Translations of The Adventures of Tintin into Germanic languages
- Scientific career
- Fields: Linguistics, philology, Germanic languages
- Doctoral advisor: Irmengard Rauch

Arden Ray Smith (January 4, 1966) is a member of the Elvish Linguistic Fellowship and holds a Ph.D. in Germanic Linguistics from the University of California, Berkeley. He has published numerous articles relating to the languages constructed by J. R. R. Tolkien. He was a columnist and editor of Vinyar Tengwar, for which he wrote the popular column "Transitions in Translations", in which odd elements in translations of J. R. R. Tolkien's work were described and commented upon.

On July 1, 2012, Smith was appointed to the Volapük Academy by the Cifal, Brian R. Bishop, for his work with conlangs in general and provision of internet resources for the constructed language Volapük in particular.

== Bibliography ==
- Vinyar Tengwar
  - (various issues)
- Parma Eldalamberon
  - (various issues)
- 1995: Proceedings of the J. R. R. Tolkien Centenary Conference
  - "A Mythology for England" (with Carl F. Hostetter), on the question of whether Tolkien created a Mythology for England
- 1997: Hands of the Healer
  - (linguistic contribution)
- 2000: SEVEN: An Anglo-American Literary Review, Vol. 17
  - "Tolkien and Esperanto" (with Patrick H. Wynne)
- 2000: Tolkien's Legendarium: Essays on The History of Middle-earth
  - "Certhas, Skirditaila, Futhark: A Feigned History of Runic Origins"
- 2001: Other Hands 31/32
  - (linguistic contribution)
- 2003: Tolkien in Translation
  - "The Treatment of Names in Esperanto Translations of Tolkien's Works"
- 2006: Tolkien Studies: Vol. 3
  - "Translating Tolkien: Philological Elements in 'The Lord of the Rings' (review)", a review of Allan Turner's book
- 2006: J.R.R. Tolkien Encyclopedia: Scholarship and Critical Assessment
  - (various entries)
- 2006: The Lord of the Rings 1954-2004: Scholarship in Honor of Richard E. Blackwelder
  - "Tolkienian Gothic"
