= Quenya =

Fictional language in the fantasy works of J. R. R. Tolkien

- Eldarin
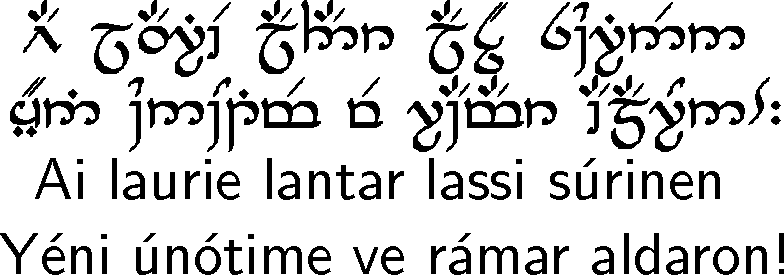
- Beginning of the Quenya poem Namárië written in Tengwar and in Latin script
- Created by: J. R. R. Tolkien
- Date: c. 1910 – c. 1973
- Setting and usage: The fictional world of Middle-earth
- Purpose: constructed languages: artistic languages; fictional languages; Quenya
- Writing system: Latin; Tengwar; Cirth; Sarati

Language codes
- ISO 639-3: qya
- Glottolog: quen1234

Quenya (/ˈkwɛnjə/; Quenya pronunciation: [ˈkʷɛnja]) (Note: In Parma Eldalamberon 22, p. 66 (9), Tolkien wrote "q (kw) consists of a lip-rounded k̊ followed by a partly unvoiced w-offglide (more marked medially than initially)". In Parma Eldalamberon 19, p. 74: ⟨ny⟩ is "a sound as in English new". In Quenya ⟨ny⟩ is a combination of consonants, ibidem., p. 81.) is a constructed language, one of those devised by J. R. R. Tolkien for the Elves in his Middle-earth fiction.

Tolkien began devising the language around 1910, and restructured its grammar several times until it reached its final state. The vocabulary remained relatively stable throughout the creation process. He successively changed the language's name from Elfin and Qenya to the eventual Quenya. Finnish had been a major source of inspiration, but Tolkien was also fluent in Latin and Old English, and was familiar with Greek, Welsh (the primary inspiration for Sindarin, Tolkien's other major Elvish language), and other ancient Germanic languages, particularly Gothic, during his development of Quenya.

Tolkien developed a complex internal history of characters to speak his Elvish languages in their own fictional universe. He felt that his languages changed and developed over time, as did the historical languages which he studied professionally—not in a vacuum, but as a result of the migrations and interactions of the peoples who spoke them.

Within Tolkien's legendarium, Quenya is one of the many Elvish languages spoken by the immortal Elves, called Quendi ('speakers') in Quenya. Quenya translates as simply "language" or, in contrast to other tongues that the Elves met later in their long history, "elf-language". After the Elves divided, Quenya originated as the speech of two clans of "High Elves" or Eldar, the Noldor and the Vanyar, who left Middle-earth to live in Eldamar ("Elvenhome"), in Valinor, the land of the immortal and God-like Valar. Of these two groups of Elves, most of the Noldor returned to Middle-earth where they met the Sindarin-speaking Grey-elves. The Noldor eventually adopted Sindarin and used Quenya primarily as a ritual or poetic language, whereas the Vanyar who stayed behind in Eldamar retained the use of Quenya.

In this way, the Quenya language was symbolic of the high status of the Elves, the firstborn of the races of Middle-earth, because of their close connection to Valinor, and its decreasing use also became symbolic of the slowly declining Elvish culture in Middle-earth. In the Second Age of Middle-earth's chronology the Men of Númenor learnt the Quenya tongue. In the Third Age, the time of the setting of The Lord of the Rings, Quenya was learnt as a second language by all Elves of Noldorin origin, and it continued to be used in spoken and written form, but their mother-tongue was the Sindarin of the Grey-elves. As the Noldor remained in Middle-earth, their Noldorin dialect of Quenya also gradually diverged from the Vanyarin dialect spoken in Valinor, undergoing both sound changes and grammatical changes.

The Quenya language featured prominently in Tolkien's The Lord of the Rings, as well as in his posthumously published history of Middle-earth The Silmarillion. The longest text in Quenya published by Tolkien during his lifetime is the poem "Namárië"; other published texts are no longer than a few sentences. At his death, Tolkien left behind a number of unpublished writings on Quenya, and later Tolkien scholars have prepared his notes and unpublished manuscripts for publication in the journals Parma Eldalamberon and Vinyar Tengwar, also publishing scholarly and linguistic analyses of the language. Tolkien never created enough vocabulary to make it possible to converse in Quenya, although fans have been writing poetry and prose in Quenya since the 1970s. This has required conjecture and the need to devise new words, in effect developing a kind of neo-Quenya language.

== External history ==
J. R. R. Tolkien began to construct his first Elvish tongue c. 1910–1911 while he was at the King Edward's School, Birmingham. He later called it Qenya (c. 1915), and later changed the spelling to Quenya. He was then already familiar with Latin, Greek, Spanish, and several ancient Germanic languages, such as Gothic, Old Norse, and Old English. (Note: Letter #163, The Letters of J. R. R. Tolkien.) He had invented several cryptographic codes, and two or three constructed languages. Tolkien took an interest in the Finnish mythology of the Kalevala, then became acquainted with Finnish, which he found to provide an aesthetically pleasing inspiration for his High-elvish language. Many years later, he wrote: "It was like discovering a complete wine-cellar filled with bottles of an amazing wine of a kind and flavour never tasted before. It quite intoxicated me." Regarding the inspiration for Quenya, Tolkien wrote that:

The ingredients in Quenya are various, but worked out into a self-consistent character not precisely like any language that I know. Finnish, which I came across when I had first begun to construct a 'mythology' was a dominant influence, but that has been much reduced [now in late Quenya]. It survives in some features: such as the absence of any consonant combinations initially, the absence of the voiced stops b, d, g (except in mb, nd, ng, ld, rd, which are favoured) and the fondness for the ending -inen, -ainen, -oinen, also in some points of grammar, such as the inflexional endings -sse (rest at or in), -nna (movement to, towards), and -llo (movement from); the personal possessives are also expressed by suffixes; there is no gender. (Note: From a letter to W. R. Matthews, dated 13–15 June 1964, published in Parma Eldalamberon (17), p. 135.)

Tolkien never intended Quenya or any of his constructed languages to be used in everyday life as an international auxiliary language, although he was in favour of the idea of Esperanto as an auxiliary language within Europe. With his Quenya, Tolkien pursued a double aesthetic goal: "classical and inflected". This urge was a major motivation for his creation of a 'mythology'. While the language developed, Tolkien felt that it needed speakers, including their own history and mythology, which he thought would give a language its 'individual flavour'. (Note: Tolkien, J. R. R. The Lord of the Rings "Foreword to the Second Edition".) The Lord of the Rings, according to Tolkien, "was primarily linguistic in inspiration and was begun in order to provide the necessary background of 'history' for Elvish tongues". This process of first inventing a language and then creating a background setting for its fictional speakers has been described as unique. Dimitra Fimi, a Tolkien scholar, argues that Tolkien's invention of Qenya started as a quest for the ideal language, to match the moral and aesthetic objectives that were part of his project of creating "a mythology for England". Fimi argues that Tolkien deliberately used sound symbolism to unify sound and meaning and make the language appear as an ideal language, fit to be spoken in the utopian realm of the Elves and fairies of Valinor. Tolkien considered Quenya to be "the one language which has been designed to give play to my own most normal phonetic taste". (Note: Tolkien, J. R. R. 1997. The Monsters and the Critics, and Other Essays. p. 212)

From the onset, Tolkien used comparative philology and the tree model as his major tools in his constructed languages. He usually started with the phonological system of the proto-language and then proceeded by inventing for each daughter language the necessary sequence of sound changes. "I find the construction and the interrelation of the languages an aesthetic pleasure in itself, quite apart from The Lord of the Rings, of which it was/is in fact independent." (Note: J. R. R. Tolkien, letter to a reader, Parma Eldalamberon (17), p. 61.)

=== Development ===
In his lifetime, Tolkien experimented ceaselessly with his constructed languages, and they were subjected to many revisions. Quenya had many grammars with substantial differences between the different stages of its development. During the first conceptual stage of early Quenya c. 1910 to c. 1920, the language was called Elfin in English and Eldarissa in Qenya proper. While its development was a continuous process, Quenya underwent a number of major revisions in its grammar, mostly in conjugation and the pronominal system. The vocabulary, however, was not subject to sudden or extreme change. Tolkien sometimes changed the meaning of a word, but he almost never discarded it once invented, and he kept on refining its meaning, and countlessly forged new synonyms. Moreover, Elvish etymology was in constant flux. Tolkien delighted in inventing new etymons for his Quenya vocabulary. But after the publication of The Lord of the Rings (finished c. 1949–1950, published in 1954–1955), the grammar rules of Quenya went through very few changes and this version was then defined as late Quenya (c. 1950–1973).

The spelling Qenya is sometimes used to distinguish early Quenya from later versions. Qenya differs from late Quenya by having different internal history, vocabulary, and grammar rules as described in the "Qenyaqetsa". Examples include a different accusative or the abolition of final consonant clusters in later Quenya. Fimi suggests that Qenya as it appears in the "Qenyaqetsa" was supposed to be a mystic language, as the Lexicon contains a number of words with clear Christian religious connotations, such as anatarwesta "crucifixion" and evandilyon "gospel" – these words were not part of late Quenya.

In the early 1930s, Tolkien decided that the proto-language of the Elves was Valarin, the tongue of the gods or Valar as he called them: "The language of the Elves derived in the beginning from the Valar, but they changed it even in the learning, and moreover modified and enriched it constantly at all times by their own invention." (Note: Tolkien 2010, Parma Eldalamberon No. 19, pp. 18–28) In the Comparative Tables the mechanisms of sound change were described by Tolkien for the following daughter languages: Qenya, Lindarin (a dialect of Qenya), Telerin, Old Noldorin (or Fëanorian), Noldorin (or Gondolinian), Ilkorin (especially of Doriath), Danian of Ossiriand, East Danian, Taliska, West Lemberin, North Lemberin, and East Lemberin. For this proto-language of the Elves, Tolkien appears to have borrowed the five-part plosive system of Proto-Indo-European, the ancestor of Sanskrit, Greek, Latin, and others; namely, one labial, one coronal, and three velar plosives (palatal, plain, and labial). The first table below provides some of the "Primary Initial Combinations" from the Comparative Tables.

Comparative table of initial nasal consonants in Elvish languages
Valarin	Qenya	Lindarin	Telerin
mb	m, umb	m, umb	m, emb
nd	n, and	n, and	n, end
ŋg	ŋ > n, ing	n, ing	ŋg, eng
ŋgj	ny, iny, indy	ñ, ind	g, ang
ŋgw	ŋw > nw, ungw	m, ungw	m, emb

Another characteristic of Quenya reminiscent of ancient natural languages like Old Greek, Old English or Sanskrit is the dual grammatical number which is used in addition to singular and plural. It has been suggested that Tolkien used the dual to give Quenya an "archaic feel" in its role as an ancient language of the Elves.

About ten years later, Tolkien changed his mind about the origin of the Elvish proto-language. Instead of learning from the Valar, the Elves had created an original language Quenderin which had become the proto-language of the Elvish language family. (Note: J. R. R. Tolkien, "Lambion Ontale: Descent of Tongues", Tengwesta Qenderinwa 2, Parma Eldalamberon (18), p. 71: "The Elves began to make in the beginning of their being [a language] and it is one with their being, since it was of their nature and the first of all their gift to devise names and words.") For this new language, Tolkien kept the many roots he had invented for Valarin in the 1930s, which then became "Quenderin roots". The Eldarin family of languages comprises Quenya, Telerin, Sindarin and Nandorin. The evolution in Quenya and Telerin of the nasalised initial groups of Quenderin is described thus in Tolkien's Outline of Phonology:

These groups in Quenya normally became simplified to nasals initially. (In Telerin they became b, d, g.)

Thus:

1. mb- > m, as in *mbar- > Q. már 'habitation'.
2. nd- > n, as in *ndōrē > Q. nóre 'country'.
3. ñg- > ñ, as in *ñgolodō > Q. Ñoldo 'Noldo, Gnome'.
4. ñgy > ny, as in *ñgyar- > Q. nyare 'recites'.
5. ñgw > ñw, as in *ñgwar- > Q. ñware (pronounced [ˈŋwärɛ]) 'frets, wears away'. (Note: Tolkien 2010, Parma Eldalamberon No. 19, p. 76.)

In contrast to early Qenya, the grammar of Quenya was influenced by Finnish, an agglutinative language, but much more by Latin, a synthetic and fusional language, and also Greek, (Note: Tolkien wrote about Quenya: "It might be said to be composed on a Latin basis with two other (main) ingredients that happen to give me 'phonaesthetic' pleasure: Finnish, and Greek". Letter No. 144. The Letters of J. R. R. Tolkien.) from which he probably took the idea of the diglossia of Quenya with its highly codified variety: the Parmaquesta, used only in certain situations such as literature. The phonology of Quenya was also inspired by certain aspects of Finnish, but this is not easily recognised.

Tolkien almost never borrowed words directly from real languages into Quenya. The major exception is the name Earendel/Eärendil, which he found in an Old English poem by Cynewulf. Yet the Finnish influence extended sometimes also to the vocabulary. A few Quenya words, such as tul- "come" and anta- "give", clearly have a Finnish origin. Other forms that appear to have been borrowed are actually coincidental, such as Finnish kirja "book", and Quenya cirya "ship". Tolkien invented the Valarin and Quenderin root kir- from which sprang his Quenya word cirya. The Latin aurōra "dawn" and Quenya aure "moment of special meaning, special day, festival day" are unrelated. Quenya aurë comes from the Valarin and Quenderin root ur-. Germanic influence can more be seen in grammar (the -r nominative plural ending is reminiscent of the Scandinavian languages) or phonology, than in words: Arda, the Quenya name for "region", just happened to resemble Germanic Erde "earth", while it actually comes from the Valarin and Quenderin root gar-. According to Tom DuBois and Scott Mellor, the name of Quenya itself may have been influenced by the name Kven, a language closely related to Finnish, but Tolkien never mentioned this.

Some linguists have argued that Quenya can be understood as an example of a particular kind of artificial language that helps to create a fictional world. Other such languages would include Robert Jordan's Old Tongue in his novel The Wheel of Time, and the Klingon language of the Star Trek series invented by Marc Okrand. It was observed that they form "a sociolinguistic context within which group and individual identities can be created."

=== Publication of linguistic papers ===
Two journals, Vinyar Tengwar from issue No. 39 (July 1998), and Parma Eldalamberon from issue No. 11 (1995), have been exclusively devoted to the editing and publishing of Tolkien's mass of unpublished linguistic papers. Important grammatical texts, alluded to in the History of Middle-earth series and described as almost unreadable or quite incomprehensible, have been published in these two journals. The "Early Qenya Grammar", written by Tolkien c. 1925, was edited and published in Parma Eldalamberon No. 14. (Note: Parma Eldalamberon No. 14.)

=== Scholarship ===
In 1992, according to the Tolkien scholar Carl F. Hostetter, the Tolkien scholar Anthony Appleyard made "the first comprehensive attempt ... to systematize Quenya grammar in light of the new information published in The History of Middle-earth, particularly The Etymologies, in his article 'Quenya Grammar Reexamined'." Hostetter commented that Appleyard's work was by 2007 useful mainly for summarising the attitudes to Tolkien's languages at that time. He characterised it as:

1. seeking to label and describe a unique function for each "grammatical inflection", such as the so-called "respective case"
2. seeking to "fill in gaps" that a linguist of English or Latin might expect
3. seeking to avoid "(supposed) 'clashes' and 'ambiguities'"
4. being willing "to reject or even ascribe to authorial error" grammatical forms that did not seem to fit in
5. seeking to complete or extend the languages by creating new forms
6. being willing to declare Tolkien's early words or forms "obsolete" if later forms seemed to have the same meanings
7. being willing to conflate forms from different Tolkien stages when these seemed to be "useful"

In 2008, the computational linguist Paul Strack created the Elvish Data Model (abbreviated to "Eldamo") to provide a lexicon – both a dictionary and an analysis of language development – of all Tolkien's languages (despite the name, not limited to Elvish). Eldamo groups Tolkien's creative work into three real-world periods: up to 1930 ("Early"); from then to 1950 ("Middle"); and from then to 1973 ("Late"). Forms of Quenya occur in each of these periods, as follows:

Paul Strack's grouping of Quenya variants by period
Early (1910 to 1930)

Early Primitive Elvish
Early Quenya

Middle (to 1950)

Middle Primitive Elvish
Middle Ancient Quenya
Middle Quenya
Lindarin

Late (to 1973)

Primitive Elvish
Ancient Quenya
Quenya
Vanyarin

The linguist Alexander Stainton published an analysis of Quenya's prosodic structure in 2022.

=== Real-world usage ===
Attempts by fans to write in Quenya began in the 1970s, when the total corpus of published Elvish comprised only a few hundred words. Since then, the use of Elvish has flourished in poems and texts, phrases and names, and even tattoos. But Tolkien himself never made his languages complete enough for conversation. As a result, newly invented Elvish texts require conjecture and sometimes the coinage of new words. The use of Quenya has expanded over the years as new words have been created, forming a Neo-Quenya language that is based on Tolkien's original Quenya but incorporates many new elements.

Quenya and its writing system Tengwar have limited application in hobbyist and public domain works.

== Internal history ==
The Elvish languages are a family of several related languages and dialects. The following is a brief overview of the fictional internal history of late Quenya as conceived by Tolkien. Tolkien imagined an Elvish society with a vernacular language for everyday use, Tarquesta, and a more educated language for use in ceremonies and lore, Parmaquesta.

The Tolkien scholar Verlyn Flieger observed that the "degree of proximity" to the light of the Valar affected the development of both languages in terms of phonology, morphology and semantics. The division between Light Elves and Dark Elves that took place during the Sundering of the Elves is reflected in their respective languages.

=== Primitive Quendian ===
The Elves at first shared a common language, Primitive Quendian, called Quenderin in Quenya. Among the Eldar, i.e. those Elves who undertook the Great March to Valinor and Eldamar, Primitive Quendian developed into Common Eldarin. Some of the Eldar remained in Beleriand and became the Grey Elves; their language developed into Sindarin. Most of the other Eldar continued to Eldamar ('Elvenhome') in Aman and founded the great city of Tirion, where they developed Quenya. (Note: J. R. R. Tolkien, The Silmarillion, ch. 6 "Of Feanor and the Unchaining of Melkor", see also "Quenya" in the annotated Index p. 346) (Note: J. R. R. Tolkien, "Tengwesta Qenderinwa", Parma Eldalamberon 18, p. 72. "The most ancient structure of the tongue common to all the Qendelie [Elvish race] is ... not known to the Elves, through some things may be guessed or discovered by those who will compare one with another the written forms of Eldarin languages of Valinor, together with such records of the Avari as we here in Eressëa have set down in these later days.") (Note: Tolkien 1994, p. 421.)

Quenya's older form, first recorded in the sarati of Rúmil, is called Old or Ancient Quenya (Yára-Quenya in Quenya). In Eldamar, the Noldor and Vanyar spoke two slightly different though mutually intelligible dialects of Tarquesta: Noldorin Quenya and Vanyarin Quenya. (Note: J. R. R. Tolkien, "Tengwesta Qenderinwa 2", Parma Eldalamberon (18), p. 75.) Later Noldorin Quenya became Exilic Quenya, when most of the Noldor Elves followed their leader Fëanor into exile from Eldamar and back to Middle-earth, where the immortal Elves first awoke. (Note: J. R. R. Tolkien, "Words, Phrases and Passages", Parma Eldalamberon 17, p. 128.)

=== Use by Elves, Valar, and Men ===
Quenya was used by the godlike Valar. The Elves derived some loanwords from the Valar's language, which was called Valarin in Quenya, although these were more numerous in the Vanyarin dialect than in Noldorin. This was probably because of the enduringly close relationship the Vanyarin Elves had with the Valar. The Quenya as used by the Vanyar also incorporated several words from Valarin that were not found in the Noldorin dialect, such as tulka ("yellow", from Valarin tulukha(n)), ulban ("blue", presumably from the same root as Valarin ul(l)u meaning "water"), and nasar ("red", original Valarin not given). (Note: Tolkien 1994, "Part Four. Quendi and Eldar: Appendix D. *Kwen, Quenya, and the Elvish (especially Ñoldorin) words for 'Language': Note on the 'Language of the Valar'", p. 398)

According to "Quendi and Eldar: Essekenta Eldarinwa", Quendya was the usual Vanyarin name given to the Quenya language, since in Vanyarin, the consonant groups ndy and ny remained quite distinct. (Note: Tolkien 1994, p. 361.) In Noldorin, ndy eventually became ny. Tolkien explained that "the word Quenya itself has been cited as an exempla (e.g. by Ælfwine), but this is a mistake due to supposition that kwenya was properly kwendya and directly derived from the name Quendi 'Elves'. This appears not to be the case. The word is Quenya in Vanyarin, and always so in Parmaquesta." (Note: Tolkien 2010, Parma Eldalamberon No. 19, p. 93.)

The Elves of the Third Clan, or Teleri, who reached Eldamar later than the Noldor and the Vanyar, spoke a different but closely related tongue, usually called Telerin. It was seen by some Elves to be just another dialect of Quenya. This was not the case with the Teleri for whom their tongue was distinct from Quenya. After the Vanyar left the city of Túna, Telerin and Noldorin Quenya grew closer.

The rebellious Noldor, who followed their leader Fëanor to Middle-earth, spoke only Quenya. But Elu Thingol, King of the Sindar of Beleriand, forbade the use of Quenya in his realm when he learned of the slaying of Telerin Elves by the Noldor. (Note: The Silmarillion, chapter 15) By doing so, he both restricted the possibility of the Sindar to enhance and brighten their language with influences from Quenya and accelerated the "diminution and spiritual impoverishment" of the Noldorin culture. The Noldor at this time had fully mastered Sindarin, while the Sindar were slow to learn Quenya. Quenya in Middle-earth became known as Exilic Quenya when the Noldor eventually adopted the Sindarin language as their native speech after Thingol's ruling. It differed from Amanian Quenya mostly in vocabulary, having some loanwords from Sindarin. It differed also in pronunciation, representing the recognition of sound-changes which had begun among the Noldor before the exile and had caused Noldorin Quenya to diverge from Vanyarin Quenya. The change of z (< old intervocalic s) to r was the latest in Noldorin, belonging to early Exilic Quenya. The grammatical changes were only small though since the features of their "old language" were carefully taught. (Note: Parma Eldalamberon (17), p. 129.)

From the Second Age on, Quenya was used ceremonially by the Men of Númenor and their descendants in Gondor and Arnor for the official names of kings and queens; this practice was resumed by Aragorn when he took the crown as Elessar Telcontar. Quenya in the Third Age had almost the same status as the Latin language had in medieval Europe, and was called Elven-latin by Tolkien. (Note: J. R. R. Tolkien, The Lord of the Rings, Appendix F: "Of the Elves".)

== Phonology ==
Tolkien described the pronunciation of the Elvish languages by Elves, Men and Hobbits in a variety of sources. The documentation about late Quenya phonology is contained in the Appendix E of the Lord of the Rings and the "Outline of Phonology", one of Tolkien's texts, published in Parma Eldalamberon No. 19. (Note: Tolkien 2010, Parma Eldalamberon No. 19, pp. 68–107)

Tolkien based Quenya pronunciation more on Latin than on Finnish. Thus, Quenya lacks the vowel harmony and consonant gradation present in Finnish, and accent is not always on the first syllable of a word. Typical Finnish elements like the front vowels ö, ä and y are lacking in Quenya, but phonological similarities include the absence of aspirated unvoiced stops or the development of the syllables ti > si in both languages. The combination of a Latin basis with Finnish phonological rules resulted in a product that resembles Italian in many respects, which was Tolkien's favourite modern Romance language. (Note: The Letters of J. R. R. Tolkien, #223: "I remain in love with Italian, and feel quite lorn without a chance of trying to speak it.")

The tables below list the consonants (Q. ólamar) and vowels of late colloquial Noldorin Quenya, i.e. Quenya as spoken among the Exiled Noldor in Middle-earth. They are written using the International Phonetic Alphabet, unless otherwise noted.

=== Consonants ===
Quenya consonants (Note: Only phonemic consonants are listed. /ç/ and /ʍ/ are phonemic in Tarquesta, being distinguished from /hj/ and /hw/ in that they are not treated as long consonants, but are treated so in Parmaquesta and hence there may be considered the realization of the clusters /hj/ and /hw/. (Tolkien 2010, Parma Eldalamberon No. 19, p. 88.))
	Labial	Dental	Alveolar	Palatal	Velar	Glottal
Nasal	m		n		ŋ	
Plosive	p b		t d		k ɡ	
Fricative	f v	(θ)	s (z)	(ç)	x	h
Trill			r			
Approximant	(ʍ) w		l	j		

The Quenya consonant system has 6 major places of articulation: labial (involving the lips), dental (involving the tongue and the back of the teeth), alveolar (involving the tongue and the alveolar ridge of the jaw), palatal (involving the tongue and the middle part of the roof of the mouth), velar (involving the back of the tongue and the back part of the roof of the mouth), and glottal (involving the vocal folds). The voiceless dental fricative /θ/ and the voiced alveolar fricative /z/ occur in the Vanyarin varieties, but were gradually replaced with /s/ and /r/ respectively in Noldorin Quenya. Notably, voiced plosives only occur after nasals and liquids, i.e. there is no simple /b d ɡ/ but only the clusters /mb (lb) nd ld rd ŋɡ/, and these occur only between vowels. (This may not be true in Vanyarin Quenya, given the word Aldudénië, the name of a lament for the death of the Two Trees of Valinor composed by Elemmírë of the Vanyar.) Prenasalised consonants are prominent in Quenya, and include their own tengwar. The preceding table presents the inventory of classic Noldorin consonants, with consonants present in other dialects in brackets. Grouping of consonants occurs only in the central parts of a word, except for combinations with the semivowels /w/ and /j/.

Quenya orthography (using the Latin script) follows the IPA, but uses ⟨c⟩ as an alternative to ⟨k⟩, writes [ŋ] not followed by another velar as ⟨ñ⟩ (in early Quenya when this still can occur, as in Ñoldor; otherwise it is written ⟨n⟩), and represents the consonants [ç ʍ] using the digraphs ⟨hy hw⟩. Similarly, the digraphs ⟨ty ndy⟩ may represent palatal stop allophones of [t ⁿd], namely [c ⁿɟ], although they are not independent phonemes. In addition, ⟨h⟩ in the cluster ⟨ht⟩ represents [ç] after ⟨e⟩ or ⟨i⟩ and [x] after other vowels. In some instances ⟨x⟩ was used for the combination /ks/ as in Helcaraxë.

=== Morphophonemics and allophony ===
Some consonants are realised differently when they occur in clusters with certain other consonants. This particularly concerns clusters that involve the approximants /w j/ or the glottal fricative /h/. Clusters where the second consonant was /j/ are realised as palatalised consonants, and clusters where the second consonant was /w/ are realised as labialised. Consonant clusters where the initial consonant is /h/ are realised as preaspirated and devoiced.

==== Palatal clusters ====
The pronunciation of the consonant cluster ⟨hy⟩ is [ç] in Noldorin Quenya, which is a "strong voiceless y, similar to, but more frictional than the initial sound in English huge". (Note: Tolkien 2010, Parma Eldalamberon No. 19, p. 75) In Vanyarin Quenya, ⟨hy⟩ is pronounced [ʃ].

According to Tolkien, the cluster /cj/ ⟨ty⟩ is pronounced as "a 'front explosive' [c], as e.g. Hungarian ty, but it is followed by an appreciable partly unvoiced y-offglide". (Note: J. R. R. Tolkien, "Quenya Consonants", Parma Eldalamberon (22), p. 66.) It may be equivalent to a partially-devoiced [c̟ɕ] or [t̠ʲɕ] as in Conservative Received Pronunciation Tuesday [ˈt̠ʲɕuːzdeɪ].

Tolkien stated that the cluster ⟨ny⟩ is pronounced as in English "new" [njuː]. (Note: Tolkien 2010, Parma Eldalamberon No. 19, p. 74.) In the Vanyarin dialect, ⟨ty⟩, ⟨dy⟩, and ⟨hy⟩ were realised as [tʃ], [dʒ], and [ʃ] respectively. Tolkien wrote about ⟨py⟩: "In Vanyarin Quenya and among some Ñoldor the cluster ⟨py⟩ was sounded with voiceless y, sc. as [pç], which later in Vanyarin became [pʃ]"; (Note: Tolkien 2010, Parma Eldalamberon No. 19, p. 86.) cf. Hungarian lopj [lopç] 'steal'.

==== Labial clusters ====
The cluster ⟨hw⟩ is realised as [ʍ], a "spirantal voiceless w. It has more tense with closer lip-aperture and more friction than the voiceless wh of English". According to Tolkien, the graph ⟨q⟩ or ⟨qu⟩ is pronounced as "a lip-rounded 'k' followed by a partly unvoiced w-offglide", that is /kʷ/.

==== Glottal clusters ====
The clusters ⟨hl⟩ and ⟨hr⟩ are realised as [ɬ] and [r̥], the same as ⟨lh⟩ and ⟨rh⟩ in Sindarin. These, like their Sindarin equivalents, derived from Primitive Elvish sl- and sr-. The primitive consonant clusters sm- and sn- came out in Quenya as ⟨m⟩ and ⟨n⟩; it has been suggested that there was an intermediate stage of ⟨hm⟩ and ⟨hn⟩, the voiceless versions [m̥] and [n̥], in Common Eldarin; these soon merged with the voiced ⟨m⟩ and ⟨n⟩. Voiceless hl and hr have a complex history which Tolkien describes thus: "Among the Noldor hr, hl became voiced to r, l before the Exile, and the use of r, l in these cases was normal in Tarquesta, as spoken, tho' the spelling was usually maintained. Since later the Exiles were familiar with voiceless hr, hl in their Sindarin speech many of them restored this sound in Tarquesta, according to the traditional spelling. The learned had, of course, at all times retained hr, hl in reading or reciting Parmaquesta." (Note: Tolkien 2010, Parma Eldalamberon No. 19, p. 79.)

==== Simplification of clusters ====
In the late Ancient Quenya period, when vowels were lost in long compound words, the clusters thus created, or the consonants that became final, were as a rule changed or reduced:

-m > -n;
all stops > -t;
-d > -r;
-th > -t;
-nd > -n;
-mb, -ng > -n;
-ñ > -n;
any combination with s (as -ts, -st, -ss) > -s;
any combination with -ht > -t.

=== Vowels ===
==== Monophthongs ====
Quenya vowels
	Front	Back
Close	i(ː)	u(ː)
Close-mid	eː	oː
Open-mid	ɛ	ɔ
Open	a(ː)	

Quenya has five vowels (Q. ómar), and a distinction of length. The short vowels are ⟨a e i o u⟩ and the long ones are written with an acute accent as ⟨á é í ó ú⟩. The precise quality of the vowels is not known, but their pronunciation is likely closer to the "pure" vowels of Italian and Spanish than to the diphthongised English ones. According to Pesch, for the vowels ⟨a i u⟩ the short and long forms have the same vowel quality, similar to the vowels of Finnish or Polish. But for the vowels ⟨e o⟩, the short vowels are pronounced slightly lower and closer to [ɛ] and [ɔ], respectively, whereas the long ones are pronounced as high-mid vowels [eː] and [oː]. This interpretation is based on a statement by Tolkien, saying that ⟨é⟩ and ⟨ó⟩, when correctly pronounced by Elves, were just a little "tenser and 'closer'" than their short counterparts: "neither very tense and close, nor very slack and open". (Note: Tolkien 2010, Parma Eldalamberon No. 19, p. 106.) This interpretation results in a vowel system with 7 different vowel qualities and a length distinction in the high and low vowels only; this system is depicted in the preceding table.

==== Diphthongs ====
Late Noldorin Quenya has 6 diphthongs (Q. ohloni): ⟨ai au eu iu oi ui⟩. All of these are falling, except for ⟨iu⟩ [ju], which is rising. In Old Quenya, all diphthongs were falling. Tolkien wrote: "It is probable that before the Exile Vanyarin and Noldorin [Quenya] in common shifted iu, ui to rising diphthongs, (Note: Tolkien 2010, Parma Eldalamberon No. 19, p. 107.) (...) but only iu is reported as a rising diphthong [ju] similar to the beginning of English yule [juːɫ]. On the other hand, ui remained in Exilic Quenya a falling diphthong as reported".

Late Noldorin Quenya diphthongs
	Second component	
First component	Front	Back
Close	⟨ui⟩ [ui̯]	⟨iu⟩ [ju]
Open-mid	⟨oi⟩ [ɔi̯]	⟨eu⟩ [ɛu̯]
Open	⟨ai⟩ [ai̯]	⟨au⟩ [au̯]

=== Syllables and stress ===
In Quenya, the stressing of a syllable is predictable and non-phonemic (i.e. the meaning of a word never changes depending on the stress), but it is partly determined by syllable weight. Words of two syllables are stressed on the first syllable. In words of three or more syllables, the stress is on the penultimate syllable if this is heavy, otherwise on the antepenultimate syllable, i.e. the third-to-last syllable. This stress rule is the same as the stress-pattern found in Latin. In Quenya, heavy syllables are syllables that contain either a long vowel, a diphthong, or a final consonant (thus an intervocalic consonant cluster: ll, ld, mm, ss, ny, ry, etc.). Medially hy and hw close a syllable in Parmaquesta, but not colloquially in Tarquesta. Quenya has also a secondary accent. The placement of stress and the distinction between heavy and light syllables is important in Quenya verse. (Note: Tolkien 2010, Parma Eldalamberon No. 19, p. 88.)

=== Phonotactics ===
Tolkien also devised phonotactical rules for late Quenya, governing the way in which the sounds could be combined to form words:

- Only the following consonants have phonemically geminated forms, i.e. elongated consonants:

pp, tt, cc, mm, nn, ss, ll, rr. (However, Quenya for "death" is effírië, featuring a geminated f.)

These occur only medially. (Note: Tolkien 2010, Parma Eldalamberon No. 19, p. 81.) The geminated occlusives pp, tt, cc are aspirated.

- Tolkien wrote that in Common Eldarin as final consonants only the "dentals t, s, d, th, n, r, l (all frequent except th) and the labial nasal m (frequent). In addition the combination -nt (though usually a coalescence of more than one inflexional element) seems also to have been permitted; possibly also st. No other consonant groups were tolerated. y, w are not included, since they naturally took the syllabic forms i, u as suffixed elements." (Note: Tolkien 2010, Parma Eldalamberon No. 19, p. 80.) These evolved from Common Eldarin to Quenya Tolkien explains on the same page thus: m > n; t, n, r and s remained without change; final C.E. th became Quenya t and final d > r, and so: "the list of 'permissible finals':

n, r, l, s, t, nt

remained constant in Quenya speech-feeling".

- Quenya tolerates only the following initial consonants:

p, t, c, f, s, h, hy, hw, m, n, ñ, v, l, hl, r, hr, y, w. (Note: Tolkien 2010, Parma Eldalamberon No. 19, p. 103.)

- Quenya tolerates only the following initial groups:

x, ps, ty, ny, ly, qu, ñw (became nw in Noldorin Quenya)

- Quenya tolerates only the following medial biconsonantal groups (those especially common are bolded):

ht, lc, ld, lf, lm, lp, lqu, lt, lv, lw, ly, mb, mn, mp, my, nc, nd, ng, nt, nw (ñw initial only), ny, ps, pt, qu, rc, rd, rm, rn, rp, rt, rs, rv, rw, ry, sc, st, sw, ts, tw, ty, x.

- Quenya does not tolerate triconsonantal (or longer) combinations, except c, h, g followed by w, or h, t, d followed by y. So, Quenya permits the following 12 triconsonantal groups only:

nqu, lqu, rqu, squ, ngw, rhw, nty, lty, hty, rty, sty, lhy.

Differences in triconsonant pronunciation:

hty [çc] in Noldorin Quenya, [ʃt͡ʃ] in Vanyarin Quenya, (Note: Tolkien 2010, Parma Eldalamberon No. 19, p. 84.)
sty [sc] in Noldorin Quenya, [ʃt͡ʃ] in Vanyarin Quenya (cf. ść vs. szcz in Polish), (Note: Tolkien 2010, Parma Eldalamberon No. 19, p. 87.)
In all other cases y, and w became syllabic i, u after the consonant groups. (Note: Tolkien 2010, Parma Eldalamberon No. 19, p. 82.)

- Quenya does not tolerate the combination of two different occlusives. "Where these anciently occurred, as in pt, ct, one of the two, or both, became opened and spirantal."
- As in Sindarin, the combination ft is avoided.

== Grammar ==
The grammar of Quenya is agglutinative and mostly suffixing, i.e. different word particles are joined by appending them. It has basic word classes of verbs, nouns and pronouns/determiners, adjectives and prepositions. Nouns are inflected for case and number. Verbs are inflected for tense and aspect, and for agreement with subject and object. In early Quenya, adjectives agree with the noun they modify in case and number, but not in later Quenya, where this agreement disappears. The basic word order is subject–verb–object. Unless otherwise noted, samples in this section refer to Late Quenya as conceived by Tolkien after 1951.

=== Nouns ===
Quenya nouns can have up to four numbers: singular, general plural ("plural 1"), particular/partitive plural ("plural 2"), and dual. In late Quenya Tarquesta, the plural is formed by a suffix to the subjective form of the noun: for plural 1 the suffix is -i or -r; for plural 2 the suffix is -li. (Note: J. R. R. Tolkien, "Words, Phrases and Passages in Various Tongues in The Lord of the Rings", Parma Eldalamberon (17), p. 135.) Quenya nouns are declined for case. Parmaquesta Quenya has ten cases. These include the four primary cases: nominative, accusative, genitive, and instrumental; three adverbial cases: allative (of which the dative is a shortened form), locative (also with a shortened form), and ablative; and a possessive or adjectival case. The accusative was however only used for Parmaquesta and had been replaced by nominative in late colloquial Quenya.

=== Adjectives ===
In late Quenya, the singular endings are -a, -ë, -ëa, and a rare form -in that may be seen as a shortened form of -ina. The corresponding plural forms are -ë, -i, ië, and possibly -inë. The latter version is however not attested. Quenya adjectives may be freely used as nouns, (Note: J. R. R. Tolkien, "Early Qenya Grammar", Parma Eldalamberon (14), p. 77,) in which case they are also inflected like a noun: e.g. vinya, "new", may be used as vinyar, "news".

=== Prepositions and adverbs ===
In Quenya, there are many similarities in form between prepositions and adverbs since the grammatical case already determines the relation of verb and object. Thus:

an i falmali = i falmalinna(r) "upon the many waves"

The preposition an is related to the -nna case ending.

=== Pronouns ===
As with all parts of Quenya grammar, the pronominal system was subject to many revisions throughout Tolkien's life, and the available corpus was not systematic until a list of endings was published in Vinyar Tengwar No. 49 in 2007. In late Quenya, pronouns have both separate or independent forms, and suffix forms. (Note: "Quenya Pronominal Elements", Vinyar Tengwar (49), p. 51.) (Note: Parma Eldalamberon (17), p. 57.)

The separate pronouns have both a short and long form that are used for emphatic and normal pronouns respectively. Examples of the emphatic form include: emmë, elyë, entë (1st to 3rd person plural). Such emphatic disjunctive pronouns, were already present in early Quenya but differed from the later versions (e.g. plural: tûto, sîse, atta).

"I love him" (or "her") can be expressed in Quenya as Melinyes or Melin sé. (Note: Vinyar Tengwar (49), p. 15.) "I love them" would be then Melinyet or Melin té (these two forms are reconstructed). If a pronoun is the subject of a sentence, it becomes tied to the verb either as separate word directly before the verb, or as a suffix after the inflected verb. In the suffixed form, an -s (singular) and a -t (plural and dual) may be added to the long subjective pronouns as objectives of the 3rd person: (Note: J. R. R. Tolkien, "Words, Phrases and Passages in Various Tongues in The Lord of the Rings", Parma Eldalamberon (17), p. 110.)

utúvie-nye-s, literally "have found-I-it", "I have found it" (cf. Aragorn's outcry when he finds the sapling of the White Tree. (Note: J. R. R. Tolkien, The Lord of the Rings, The Return of the King, "The Steward and the King".))
utúvie-lye-s, "You have found it/him/her".
utúvie-lye-t, "You have found them".

It is debated whether certain attested special male and female pronouns that were exclusively used for the description of persons are still applicable to late Quenya as found in The Lord of the Rings.

=== Possessive determiners ===
The possessive determiners (analogous to English my, his, etc.) are used to indicate the possessor of the noun they determine. They mark the person and number of the possessor, and are inflected to agree with the noun they are attached in number and case. While the English language distinguishes between masculine and feminine singular possessors (his vs. her), late Quenya generally does not.

"Since by Quenya idiom in describing the parts of body of several persons the number proper to each individual is used, the plural of parts existing in pairs (as hands, eyes, ears, feet) is seldom required. Thus mánta "their hand" would be used, (they raised) their hands (one each), mántat, (they raised) their hands (each both), and mánte could not occur". (Note: Parma Eldalamberon (17), p. 161.)

Ortanentë manta. "They raised their hands."
Ortaner manta. "They raised their hands."
Varda ortanë máryat. "Varda has uplifted her (two) hands." (Note: From the "Namárië" poem by J. R. R. Tolkien.)

The usual plural ending is -r, hildinyar, "my heirs".

=== Demonstrative ===
The demonstrative makes a three-way distinction between entities the speaker is referring to:

sina, "this";
tana, "that (over there)";
enta, "that (over there, away from both of us)".

=== Verbs ===
According to Tolkien, "the inflections of [Qenya] verbs are always pretty regular", (Note: J. R. R. Tolkien, "Early Qenya Grammar", Parma Eldalamberon (14), p. 56.) and Quenya verbs are either in a personal form or an impersonal form. Usually in linguistics, an impersonal verb is a verb that cannot take a true subject, because it does not represent an action, occurrence, or state-of-being of any specific person, place, or thing. This is not how Tolkien intended the use of "impersonal." An impersonal verb form is a verb to which no pronoun has been attached, as carë (sg.) or carir (pl.); carin, "I do (habitually)", is a personal form (with -n, a short suffix for "I, me"). As explained by Tolkien, verbs in Quenya are negated by using a "negative verb" ua- in front of the proper verb in the impersonal tense form. (Note: Parma Eldalamberon (17), p. 144.)

Tolkien noted that "when the emphatic pronoun is used separately the verb has no inflexion (save for number)." (Note: Parma Eldalamberon, (17), p. 76.)

Finwë cára. "Finwë is making (right now)."
Quendi cárar. "The Elves are making."
Cáranyë. "I am making."
Cárammë. "We are making."
Essë cára. "He/She is (really) making."
Emmë cárar. "We are (really) making."

Late Quenya verbs have also a dual agreement morpheme -t:

Nai siluvat elen atta. "May two stars shine." (Note: Vinyar Tengwar (49), p. 43.)

In the imperative mood, plurality and duality are not expressed. There is no agreement. The verb stays singular. (Note: J. R. R. Tolkien, "Words, Phrases and Passages in Various Tongues in The Lord of the Rings", Parma Eldalamberon (17), pp. 93–94.)

The copula in late Quenya is the verb na-. Tolkien stated that it was used only in joining adjectives, nouns, and pronouns in statements (or wishes) asserting (or desiring) a thing to have certain quality, or to be same as another, and also that the copula was not used when the meaning was clear. (Note: Vinyar Tengwar (49), p. 9.) Otherwise, the copula is left out, which may provide for ambiguous tenses when there is no further context:

Eldar ataformaiti, can be translated in English either as "Elves are ambidexters", or "Elves were ambidexters". (Note: Vinyar Tengwar (49), p. 7.)
A mára. "A is good", or "A was good".

=== Syntax ===
Quenya allows for a flexible word order because it is an inflectional language like Latin. Nevertheless, it has word order rules. The usual syntax structure is subject-verb-object. The adjective can be placed before or after the noun that it modifies.

== Vocabulary ==
Because many of Tolkien's writings on the Elvish languages remain unpublished it is difficult to know how large a vocabulary he devised. By 2008, about 25,000 Elvish words had been published.

5. Basic vocabulary in Quenya and Sindarin
English	Quenya	Sindarin equivalent
earth	ambar, cemen	amar, ceven
sky	menel	menel
water	nén	nen
fire	nár	naur
man (male)	nér	benn
female	nís	bess
eat	mat-	mad-
drink	suc-	sog-
tall, great	alta, halla	beleg, daer
small	pitya, titta	niben, tithen
night	lóme	dû
day	aurë, ré	aur

=== Proper nouns ===
Quenya's proper nouns are names of people and things in Middle-earth. (Note: The Silmarillion, "Index" (annotated by Christopher Tolkien as a glossary), pp. 313–365)

Estë "Rest"; Indis "Bride"; Melcor "He who Arises in Might"; Nessa "Youth"; Varda "Sublime"; Voronwë "Steadfast one."
Aicanáro "Fell Fire"; Ancalimë "Most Bright Lady"; Curumo "Cunning Man"; Fëanáro "Spirit of Fire"; Olórin "(?)Dreamer"; Sauron "The Abhorred."
Ainulindalë "Music of the Ainur"; Eldamar "Home of the Eldar"; Helcaraxë "Jaws of Ice"; Ilúvatar "Father of All"; Oron Oiolossë "Ever Snow-white Peak"; Ondolindë "Rock of Song"; Turambar "Master of Doom"; Valinor "land of the Vali", sc. Valar; Vingilot "Foam-flower"; Yavanna "Giver of fruits."
Mar-nu-Falmar "Land under the Waves"; Mindon Eldaliéva "Lofty Tower of the Elvish-people"; Quenta Silmarillion "Tale of the Silmarils."

=== Some prepositions and adverbs ===
- ala: [place] beyond; [time] after.
- ama: up(wards).
- an: towards, upon.
- et: forth, out of [with the complement noun in ablative case]
- haila: [static] far beyond.
- haiya: far, far off, far away.
- han: [addition] beyond ; over and above, in addition to.
- ní: [not touching] beneath, under.
- no: 1. under. 2. upon. 3. after (of place), behind.
- nu: under, beneath.
- ono: 1. in front of, ahead, before [in all relation but time]. 2, after [of time only].

=== Greetings ===
The word used as a form of polite address to an Elf (male or female) is Tar. Among the Númenoreans it became "King/Queen" and used as a form of address for a superior, especially a King or a Queen; cf. Tarinya, used by Prince Aldarion to address his father, King Tar-Meneldur. (Note: The Silmarillion, "Appendix: Elements in Quenya and Sindarin Names", tar-.)

- Namárië [naˈmaːri.ɛ] is a reduced form of Quenya á na márië, literally "be well". It is a formula used in Tarquesta for greetings and also for farewell. (Note: Parma Eldalamberon (17), p. 162.)
- The most usual formula used by the Noldor for greeting each other is (Hara) máriessë! "(Stay) in happiness!"

In The Lord of the Rings, the hobbit Frodo Baggins used another address of welcome: Elen síla lúmenn' omentielmo!, corrected by Tolkien in the Second Edition to Elen síla lúmenn' omentielvo! This was a traditional formula in an elevated style, used between people going on crossing paths: "A star shines upon the hour of the meeting of our ways". (Note: Tolkien 1994, p. 367.)

- The most usual formula used by the Noldor in farewells is Áva márië! "Go happily!", or Márienna! "To happiness!".

=== Numerals ===
According to Christopher Tolkien, "the Eldar used two systems of numerals one of sixes (or twelves), and one of fives. (or tens)." That is a duodecimal counting (base 12), and a decimal system. The Quenya word made by J. R. R. Tolkien for the 'decimal system of counting' is maquanotië – "hand counting". (Note: J. R. R. Tolkien "HFN – The words for 'hand' – The fingers", Vinyar Tengwar, n° 47, p. 10.)

The known numbers for 1–20 are presented below; those from early Quenya ("Early Qenya Grammar") are in bold.

6. Numerals from 1 to 20
Cardinal numbers			Ordinal numbers			Fractional numbers		
No.	Quenya	English	No.	Quenya	English	No.	Quenya	English
1	min	One	1st	minya	First	1/1	**kaina**, quanta	Whole
2	atta, tata	Two	2nd	attëa, tatya	Second	1/2	peresta, perta	Half
3	neldë, nel	Three	3rd	neldëa, nelya	Third	1/3	nelesta, neldesta, nelta, nelsa	Third
4	canta, can	Four	4th	cantëa	Fourth	1/4	canasta, casta, cansat	Quarter
5	lempë, lemen, maqua	Five	5th	lempëa	Fifth	1/5	lepesta, lepsat	Fifth
6	enquë	Six	6th	enquëa	Sixth	1/6	enquesta	Sixth
7	otso	Seven	7th	otsëa	Seventh	1/7	otosta, osta, otsat	Seventh
8	toldo, tolto	Eight	8th	toldëa, toltëa	Eighth	1/8	tolosta, tosta, tolsat	Eighth
9	nertë	Nine	9th	nertëa	Ninth	1/9	neresta, nesta, nersat	Ninth
10	quëan, quain, maquat	Ten	10th	quainëa	Tenth	1/10	*quaista, caista	Tenth
11	minque	Eleven	11th	*minquëa, **minquenya**	Eleventh	1/11	minquesta	Eleventh
12	yunquë, rasta	Twelve	12th	*yunquëa, *rastëa	Twelfth	1/12	yunquesta, *rastasta	Twelfth
13	*nelquë, quainel, yunquenta	Thirteen	13th	*nelquëa, *yunquentëa	Thirteenth	1/13	*nelquesta, *yunquentesta	Thirteenth
14	canquë, quaican	Fourteen	14th	*canquëa	Fourteenth	1/14	*canquesta	Fourteenth
15	lepenquë, quailepen	Fifteen	15th	*lepenquëa	Fifteenth	1/15	*lepenquesta	Fifteenth
16	enenquë, quainquë	Sixteen	16th	*enenquëa	Sixteenth	1/16	*enenquesta	Sixteenth
17	otoquë	Seventeen	17th	*otoquëa	Seventeenth	1/17	*otoquesta	Seventeenth
18	tolquë, nahta	Eighteen	18th	*tolquëa	Eighteenth	1/18	*tolquesta	Eighteenth
19	neterquë, **húkea**	Nineteen	19th	*neterquëa, **hukaiya**	Nineteenth	1/19	*neterquesta	Nineteenth
20	*yuquain, **yukainen**	Twenty	20th	*yuquainëa, **yukainenya**	Twentieth	1/20	*yuquaista, **yukainentya**	Twentieth

Other attested number words include esta and inga for 'first'. Tolkien was dissatisfied with esta, the definition is marked with a query in the "Etymologies". (Note: J. R. R. Tolkien, "The Etymologies" in The Lost Road, p. 356.) Maqua means specifically a group of five objects, like the English word "pentad"; similarly maquat "pair of fives" refers to a group of ten objects. The word yunquenta for thirteen literally means "12 and one more". (Note: J. R. R. Tolkien, "NKE: manuscript text on neter 9, kanat 4, and enek 6", Vinyar Tengwar n° 47, p. 15.)

Quenya	English	Quenya	English
Min elen Er elen	One star A single star	Min Eleno; Er eleno	Of one star Of a single star
Elen atta	Two stars	Elen atto	Of two stars
Eleni neldë	Three stars	Elenion neldë	Of three stars
Eleni canta	Four stars	Elenion canta	Of four stars

7. "Qenya" numerals 20 onwards & Quenya reconstruction
No.	"Qenya"	Quenya		
No.	"Qenya"	Cardinal	Ordinal	Fractional
20	yukainen	*yuquain	*yuquainëa	*yuquaista
21	min(ya) yukainen	*min yuquain	*min yuquainëa	*min yuquaista
2_	_ yukainen	*_ yuquain	*_ yuquainëa	*_ yuquaista
30	nel(de)kainen	*nelquain	*nelquainëa	*nelquaista
40	kan(ta)kainen	*canquain	*canquainëa	*canquaista
50	leminkainen	*lepenquain	*lepenquainëa	*lepenquaista
60	enekkainen	*(en)enquain	*(en)enquainëa	*(en)enquaista
70	otsokainen	*otoquain	*otoquainëa	*otoquaista
80	tol(to)kainen	*tolquain	*tolquainëa	*tolquaista
90	huekainen	*neterquain	*neterquainëa	*neterquaista
100	tuksa pínea (lit. 'small gross')	*tuxa	*tuxëa	*tuxasta
100/144	tuksa	*tuxa	*tuxëa	*tuxasta
200	yúyo tuksa	*tuxa atta	*tuxëa atta	*tuxasta atta
_00	_ tukse	*tuxar _ *tuxe _	*tuxëa _	*tuxasta _
1k 10^{3}	húmë tuksa kainen, tuksainen	*húmë *quaituxa	*húmëa *quaituxëa	*húmesta *quaituxasta
2k	yúyo húmi	*húmë atta	*húmëa atta	*húmesta atta
_k	_ húmi	*húmi _	*húmëa _	*húmesta _
10^{6}	mindóre, sóra (Large number)	*mindórë	*mindórëa	*mindóresta
10^{9}	yundóre	*yundórë	*yundórëa	*yundóresta
10^{12}	neldóre	*neldórë	*neldórëa	*neldóresta
10^{15}	kantóre	*candórë	*candórëa	*candóresta
10^{18}	lemindóre	*lependórë	*lependórëa	*lependóresta
10^{21}	enqendóre	*enquendórë	*enquendórëa	*enquendóresta
10^{24}	otsondóre	*otondórë	*otondórëa	*otondóresta

"Qenya" numerals above twenty show that the smaller units come first, min yukainen "21" being "one-twenty", which reflects how they are written in Tengwar.

== Writing systems ==
Most of the time, Tolkien wrote his invented languages using the Latin script, but he devised his own writing systems to match the internal histories of his languages.

=== Elvish writing systems ===
The word quenya written in tengwar of Fëanor using the classical mode

Tolkien imagined many writing systems for his Elves. The best-known is the "Tengwar of Fëanor" but the first one he created c. 1919 was the "Tengwar of Rumil", also called the sarati. He decided that, prior to their Exile, the Noldorin Elves first used the sarati of Rúmil to record Ancient Quenya. In Middle-earth, Quenya appears to have been occasionally written using the "Elvish runes" or cirth, named certar in Quenya.

=== Latin script ===
Tolkien's spelling in Latin script of Quenya was largely phonemic, with each letter corresponding to a specific phoneme in the language. However, the vowels varied in pronunciation depending upon their length. Specific rules for consonants were provided in Appendix E of The Lord of the Rings, e.g. the letter c is always pronounced k, qu stands for kw, (Note: J. R. R. Tolkien, The Lord of the Rings, Appendix E, part I.) Orqui is Orkwi. Tolkien's standard orthography for Quenya uses all the letters of the Latin script except j, k, and z, together with the acute and diaeresis marks on vowels; the letters ñ, þ and z only appear in early Quenya. Occasionally, Tolkien wrote Quenya with a "Finnish-style" orthography (rather than the standard Latin-Romance version), in which c is replaced by k, y with j, and long vowels written double. The acute accent marks long vowels, while the diaeresis indicates that a vowel is not part of a diphthong, for example in ëa or ëo, while final e is marked with a diaeresis to remind English-speakers that it is not silent.

== Corpus ==
The poem "Namárië" is the longest piece of Quenya in The Lord of the Rings, yet the first sentence in Quenya is uttered by a Hobbit, namely Frodo's greeting to the Elves: elen síla lúmenn' omentielvo. Other examples include Elendil's words spoken upon reaching Middle-earth, and repeated by Aragorn at his coronation: Et Eärello Endorenna utúlien. Sinomë maruvan ar Hildinyar tenn' Ambar-metta! "Out of the Great Sea to Middle-earth I am come. In this place I will abide, and my heirs, unto the ending of the world!" Treebeard's greeting to Celeborn and Galadriel is also spoken in Quenya: A vanimar, vanimálion nostari "O beautiful ones, parents of beautiful children". (Note: The Letters of J. R. R. Tolkien, #230.) Another fragment is Sam's cry when he uses Galadriel's phial against Shelob: Aiya Eärendil Elenion Ancalima! "Hail Eärendil, brightest of stars!" (Note: The Return of the King, ch. 1) And in The Silmarillion, the phrase Utúlie'n aurë! Aiya Eldalië ar Atanatári, utúlie'n aurë! "The day has come! Behold, people of the Eldar and Fathers of Men, the day has come!", is cried by Fingon before the Battle of Unnumbered Tears. (Note: J. R. R. Tolkien, The Silmarillion, chapter 20)

Other Quenya poems spoken by Tolkien in public but never published in his lifetime are Oilima Markirya ("The Last Ark"), Nieninqe, and Earendel in his lecture A Secret Vice, and published in 1983 in The Monsters and the Critics. A faulty fragment of the poem "Narqelion", written in early Quenya or Elfin between November 1915 and March 1916, was published by Humphrey Carpenter in his Biography. A facsimile of the entire poem was published only in 1999.

== See also ==
- Elvish languages (Middle-earth)
- Languages constructed by J. R. R. Tolkien
- Lhammas
- Sarati
- Sindarin
