= Partitive plural =

Partitive plural is a grammatical number that is used to modify a noun which represents a part of some whole amount, as opposed to the comprehensive plural, used when the noun represents the total amount of something.

It can be found in partitive case in Finnish. One of its uses in Finnish is to express a part of a larger object, or a subset of a group of several objects.

An example in Finnish would be the difference between the use of partitive and accusative:

Finnish examples
Phrase	Case	Translation	Literal meaning
Minä syön omenaa.	Part. sing.	I am eating an apple.	I am eating a part of an apple.
Minä syön omenan.	Acc. sing.	I eat an apple.	I eat a whole apple.
Minä söin omenia.	Part. pl.	I was eating apples.	I was eating some apples.
Minä söin omenat.	Acc. pl.	I ate apples.	I ate the whole set of apples.

Finnish influenced J.R.R. Tolkien in inventing his fictional language Quenya, being present in that language as one of four grammatical numbers in Quenya, the others being singular, dual, and plural.

== See also ==
- Partitive

== Links ==
- Article about usage of the partitive case in the plural in Finnish
