= A mythology for England =

Literary analysis of Tolkien

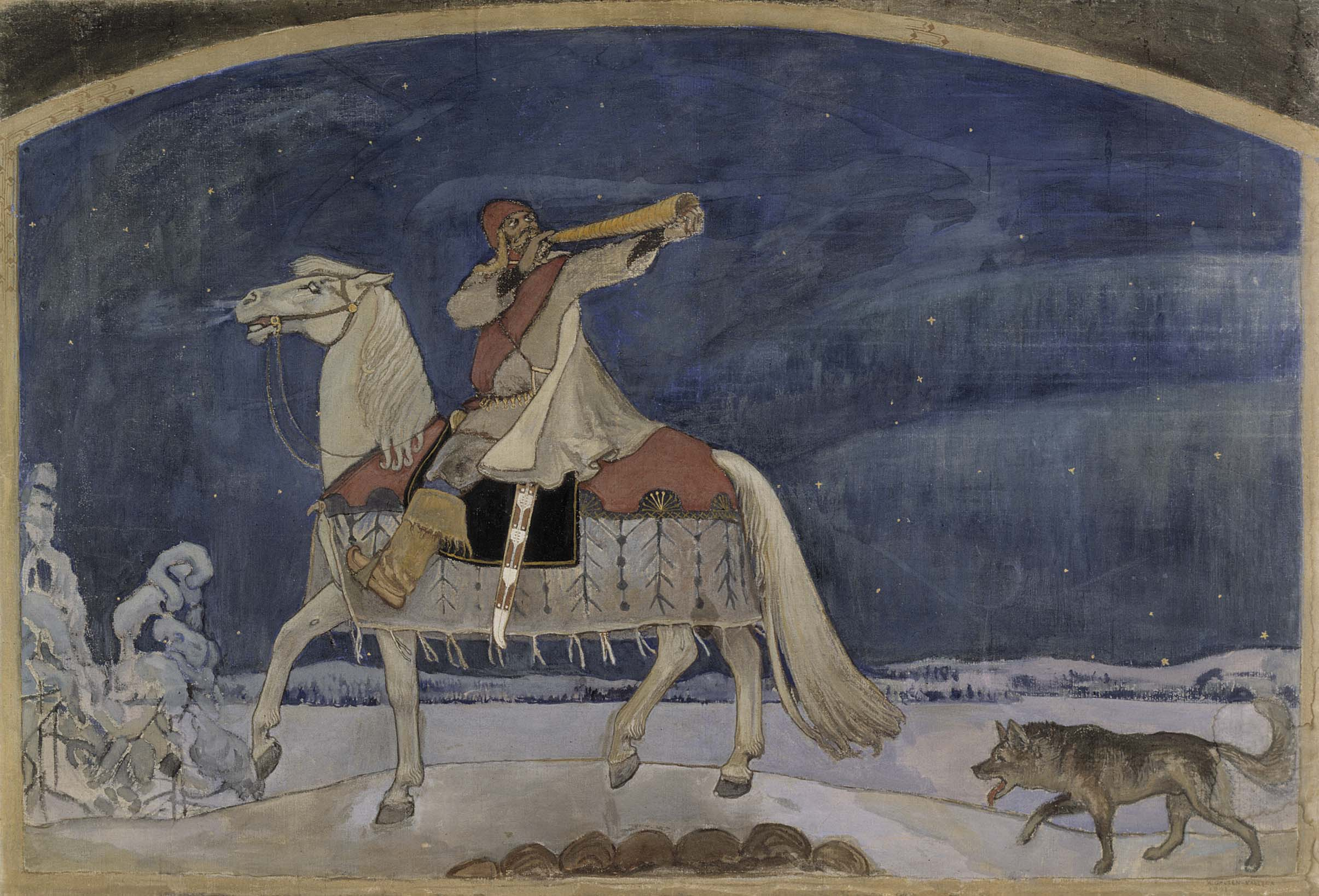
Tolkien wrote that the tale of Kullervo in the Finnish Kalevala inspired him to write stories around his constructed languages, a key step in starting his mythology for England. (Note: Carpenter 2023, letter #257 to Christopher Bretherton, 16 July 1964) Painting Kullervo Sets Off for War, Akseli Gallen-Kallela, 1901

The English author J. R. R. Tolkien has often been supposed to have spoken of wishing to create "a mythology for England". It seems he never used the actual phrase, but various commentators have found his biographer Humphrey Carpenter's phrase appropriate as a description of much of his approach in creating Middle-earth, and the legendarium behind The Silmarillion.

His desire to create a national mythology echoed similar attempts in countries across Europe, especially Elias Lönnrot's creation of the Kalevala in Finland, which Tolkien read, mainly in English, and admired. That in turn inspired him to study the Finnish language, which he found beautiful. He imitated some of its features in one of his constructed languages, which became the Elvish language Quenya. He studied Welsh, too, and it led to another Elvish language, Sindarin. He realized that he needed some speakers of those languages, leading him to create tales of elves divided into different groups. Meanwhile, his study of Old English led him to read Crist I, which mentioned a character named Earendel, described as the brightest. This attractive but puzzling description led Tolkien to write the 1914 "Voyage of Earendel the Evening Star": it became the first component of his mythology.

Tolkien attempted to reconstruct an English mythology, leading up to how the brothers Hengest and Horsa led the Jutes to Britain and founded England. He made a story that fitted together well, though he knew it was probably not what had happened. Without an actual mythology, he looked to Norse and other mythologies, and gathered hints from Old English and other medieval manuscripts. Beowulf gave him ents, elves, and orcs; Sir Gawain and the Green Knight lent the woodwoses.

The resulting legendarium, formed in the First World War and reshaped in the interwar period, reflected the state of twentieth century England, as the empire faded, wars threatened, and the country was filled with factions and dissenting voices. The result, Verlyn Flieger comments, is nearer to the vision of George Orwell's Nineteen Eighty-Four than escapist fantasy. Dimitra Fimi, on the other hand, comments that the setting is the whole of Northwestern Europe, not just England, and with its incorporation of the "Celtic", it could be described more inclusively as a "Mythology for Britain".

== Context: Tolkien's intentions ==
=== Author ===
J. R. R. Tolkien was an English author and philologist of ancient Germanic languages, specialising in Old English; he spent much of his career as a professor at the University of Oxford. He is best known for his novels about his invented Middle-earth, The Hobbit and The Lord of the Rings, and for the posthumously published The Silmarillion which provides a more mythical narrative about earlier ages. A devout Roman Catholic, he described The Lord of the Rings as "a fundamentally religious and Catholic work", rich in Christian symbolism. (Note: Carpenter 2023, letter #142 to Robert Murray, 2 December 1953)

=== A "resounding phrase" ===
In his 1977 biography of Tolkien, Humphrey Carpenter wrote:

[Tolkien] read a paper on the Kalevala (Note: Tolkien's writings on the Kalevala have been edited and published in full by Verlyn Flieger. Carpenter's quotation given here is on page 265 of Flieger's paper, in Tolkien's draft "The Kalevala".) to a college society ... about the importance of the type of mythology found in the Finnish poems. 'These mythological ballads', he said, are ... [what] the literature of Europe has ... been steadily cutting ... for many centuries. ... 'I would that we had more of it left – something of the same sort that belonged to the English.

Carpenter commented that this idea was exciting, adding that Tolkien might have been contemplating the construction of just such a "mythology for England". Catherine Butler has called this a "resounding phrase".

The Tolkien scholar Jane Chance's 1979 book Tolkien's Art: 'A Mythology for England' analysed the idea that Tolkien's Middle-earth writings were intended to form such a mythology. She cited one of Tolkien's letters, sent late in 1951: (Note: Carpenter 2023, letter #131 to Milton Waldman (at Collins), late 1951)

I had a mind to make a body of more or less connected legend, ranging from the large and cosmogonic, to the level of romantic fairy-story – the larger founded on the lesser in contact with the earth, the lesser drawing splendour from the vast backcloths – which I could dedicate simply to: to England; to my country. ... I would draw some of the great tales in fullness, and leave many only placed in the scheme, and sketched. The cycles should be linked to a majestic whole, and yet leave scope for other minds and hands, wielding paint and music and drama.

— Letter #131 to Milton Waldman (at Collins), late 1951

In a letter to The Observer about his 1937 book The Hobbit, Tolkien stated that the tale "derived from (previously digested) epic, mythology, and fairy-story", and one other source: the unpublished "'Silmarillion', a history of the Elves, to which frequent allusion is made." (Note: Carpenter 2023, letter #25 to the editor of The Observer, published there 16 January 1938) Chance commented that if indeed he was wanting to make a mythology for England, publishing books like that was an ideal way to make use of the medieval English literature such as Beowulf, Sir Gawain and the Green Knight, and Ancrene Wisse and Hali Meiðhad, that he was writing on in his scholarly life.

The concept was reinforced by Shippey's 1982 The Road to Middle-earth: How J.R.R. Tolkien Created a New Mythology. He too quotes Tolkien's letter.

In his 2004 chapter "A Mythology for Anglo-Saxon England", Michael Drout demonstrates that Tolkien never used the actual phrase "a mythology for England", even though commentators nonetheless have found it appropriate as a description of much of his approach in creating Middle-earth. Drout comments that scholars broadly agree that Tolkien "succeeded in this project" to bring such a mythology into being. The mythology's initial purpose was to provide a home for his invented languages, but Tolkien discovered as he worked on it that he wanted to make a properly English epic, spanning England's geography, language, and mythology.

Deciding on a mythology for England: likely major influences upon Tolkien were
the Brothers Grimm and Elias Lönnrot, who shaped mythologies for their countries.

== Reasons ==
=== Likely influences ===
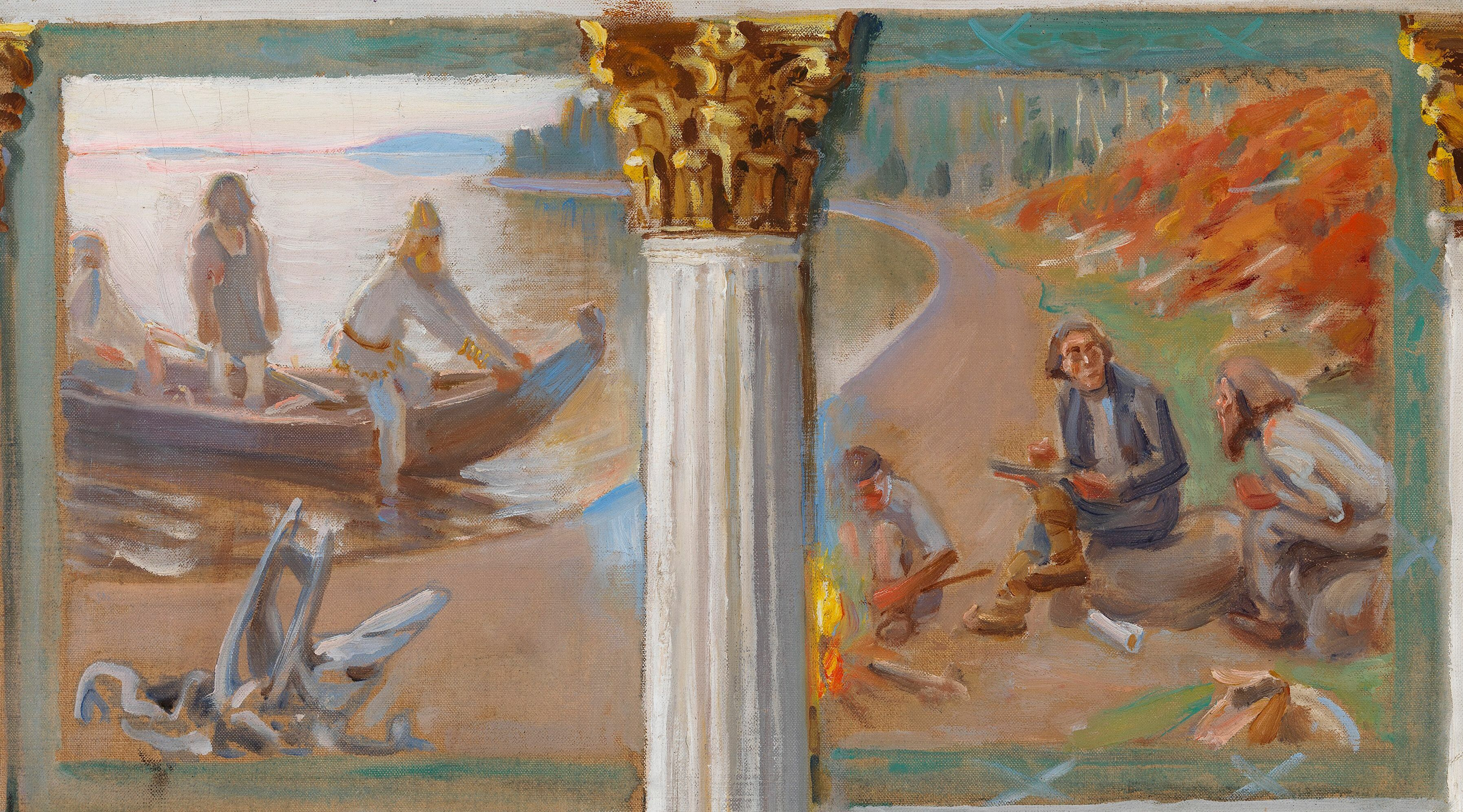
Tolkien would have liked to emulate Elias Lönnrot, who travelled Finland recording oral folklore from a living tradition. 1912 sketch for a mural, Lönnrot and the Rune Singers, by Akseli Gallen-Kallela

The folklorist and Tolkien scholar Dimitra Fimi writes that the desire to create a national mythology was not unique to Tolkien. Attempts, sometimes fraudulent, with varying degrees of success, had been made in Denmark, Finland, Germany, Scotland, and Wales in the 18th and 19th centuries. Maria Sachiko Cecire concurs, pointing out that the Brothers Grimm in Germany are the best known, but giving also the instance of Elias Lönnrot who travelled Finland collecting poems sung by the people, and then compiled the poems into a coherent narrative, the Kalevala. Cecire comments that the narrative, and the way that Lönnrot had compiled it, was certainly a major influence on Tolkien. He read and admired the Kalevala, mainly in translation, and was equally struck with what he felt was the beauty of the Finnish language. Many years later, Tolkien wrote: "It was like discovering a complete wine-cellar filled with bottles of an amazing wine of a kind and flavour never tasted before. It quite intoxicated me." (Note: Carpenter 2023, letter #163 to W. H. Auden, 7 June 1955) He made use of some of the features of Finnish in his Elvish language, Quenya.

Dimitra Fimi's analysis of attempts to create national mythologies across Europe
Nation	Date	Author	Method, materials used	Goal, work created	Notes
Scotland	1760	James Macpherson	Publish poem "translated" from Gaelic manuscripts	Cycle of poems by "Ossian"	Considered fraudulent; manuscripts never shown to exist
Wales	1789 on	Iolo Morganwg	Try to recreate ancient bardic tradition Publish poems claimed to be from medieval manuscripts; Claim national Eisteddfod derived from ancient Gorsedd	Welsh Triads	Considered fraudulent
Denmark	1808 on	Nikolai & Sven Gruntvig	Heroic poetry, ballads	Northern Mythology	Some success, useful for national identity
Germany	1812 on	Brothers Grimm	Collect mass of fairy tales	Mythology, legends	Inconclusive
Finland	1835	Elias Lönnrot	Tour country, gather mass of folk poems	Kalevala	Success, new national tradition; Influential on Tolkien
England	1914 on	J. R. R. Tolkien	Gather scraps of evidence, write layered documents	Tolkien's legendarium	Successfully re-released "Elves, Orcs, Ents, ... Woses ... into the popular imagination" alongside Trolls; added Hobbits

=== Origins ===
Tolkien began work on his mythology while still a student at Oxford University, from 1911. His interest in the Elder and Prose Eddas led him to the Kalevala in 1912. His interest in the languages used to write the mythologies caused him to study Finnish, which he studied from a grammar book, and Welsh; he found both languages beautiful. The pleasure he took in these languages triggered his construction of artificial languages, including what became the two main Elvish languages in his legendarium, Quenya and Sindarin. Tolkien stated that the tale of Kullervo in particular got him started on his legendarium: "the germ of my attempt to write legends of my own to fit my private languages was the tragic tale of the hapless Kullervo in the Finnish Kalevala". In a separate thread, his reading in 1914 of the Old English manuscript Crist I led to Earendel and the first element of his legendarium, "The Voyage of Earendel, the Evening Star".

Tolkien's legendarium grew from Norse mythology, the Kalevala,
the Finnish and Welsh languages, proto-Quenya and proto-Sindarin, and Crist I.
Humphrey Carpenter dubbed it "A mythology for England".

== Methods ==
=== A reconstructed prehistory ===
Tolkien recognised that any actual English mythology had been extinguished. He presumed, by analogy with Norse mythology and the clues that remain, that one had existed until Anglo-Saxon times. Tolkien decided to reconstruct such a mythology, accompanied to some extent by an imagined prehistory or pseudohistory of the Angles, Saxons, and Jutes before they migrated to England. Drout analyses in detail and then summarises the imagined prehistory:

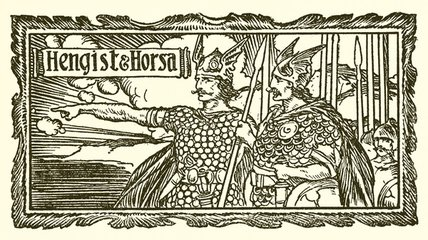
The brothers Hengest and Horsa are the legendary founders of England. Illustration from Edward Parrott's 1909 Pageant of British History

The original settlers of Anglo-Saxon England were the sons and descendants of Ælfwine, the Elf-friend who had sailed across the sea to the Holy Isle of the Elves. The prehistory of the descendants of Ælfwine was Tolkien's invented mythology of Arda, but it also included the story of Beowulf, a depiction of the exploits of some others of their ancestors. The early history of Anglo-Saxon England was generated when the half-brothers of Heorrenda, Hengest and Horsa, led the migration of the Jutes from the continent to England. Heorrenda himself composed Beowulf and compiled the legends of Arda in the Golden Book of Heorrenda. Hengest is a character in Beowulf and in Finnsburg. The hero of Beowulf is a Geat, which equals a Goth, one of the continental ancestors of the Anglo-Saxons... It all fits nicely together even though it is probably not true (and Tolkien knew this).

The scholar of literature Nicholas Birns argues that Tolkien's work on the Finn and Hengest story combines aspects of his conjectural research into English origins and mythological arguments made in his legendarium. He chose to take the key word eotenas to mean "Jutes", not "monsters", allowing him to explore making Hengest into a kind of national hero of England.

=== Old English heroes, races, and monsters ===
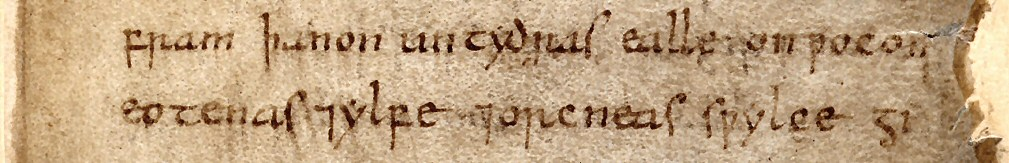
The Old English poem Beowulf's eotenas [ond] ylfe [ond] orcneas, "ogres [and] elves [and] devil-corpses", inspired Tolkien to create ents, elves, orcs, and other races for his mythology for England.

Given that hardly anything was left of English mythology, Tolkien looked to Norse and other mythologies for clues as to what might have been there. He found hints in Beowulf, which he greatly admired, and other Old English sources, which gave him his ettens (as in the Ettenmoors) and ents, his elves, and his orcs; his "warg" is a cross between Old Norse vargr and Old English wearh. He took his woses or wood-woses (the Drúedain) from the seeming plural wodwos in the Middle English Sir Gawain and the Green Knight, line 721; that comes in turn from Old English wudu-wasa, a singular noun. Shippey comments that:

As for creating a "Mythology for England", one certain fact is that the Old English notions of Elves, Orcs, Ents, Ettens and Woses have through Tolkien been re-released into the popular imagination to join the much more familiar Dwarves ..., Trolls, ... and the wholly-invented Hobbits.

The linguist and Tolkien scholar Carl Hostetter comments that all the same,

even Beowulf fails to meet Tolkien's criteria for a truly English epic, for though it was composed in Old English, and makes a new and characteristically English use of Germanic mythological elements, nevertheless no part of it is set in England; and so though the poem moves beneath northern skies, those skies are nevertheless not English.

Hostetter notes that Eärendil, the mariner who ends up steering his ship across the heavens, shining as a star, was the first element of English mythology that Tolkien took into his own mythology. He was inspired by the Earendel passage in the Old English poem Crist I lines 104–108 which begins "Eala Earendel, engla beorhtast", "O rising light, brightest of angels". Tolkien expended considerable effort on his Old English character Ælfwine, whom he employed as a framing device in his The Book of Lost Tales; he used a character of the same name in his abandoned time travel novel The Lost Road.

== Effects ==
=== A reflection of twentieth century England ===
Verlyn Flieger writes that "the Silmarillion legendarium" is both a monument to his imagination and as close as anyone has come "to a mythology that might be called English". She cites Tolkien's words in The Monsters and the Critics that it is "by a learned man writing of old times, who looking back on the heroism and sorrow feels in them something permanent and something symbolical". He was speaking about Beowulf; she applies his words to his own writings, that his mythology was meant to provide

the illusion of surveying a past, pagan but noble and fraught with deep significance—a past that itself had depth and reached backward into a dark antiquity of sorrow".

Flieger comments that "Tolkien's great mythological song" was conceived as the First World War was changing England for ever; that it grew and took shape in a second era between the wars; and that in the form of The Lord of the Rings found an audience in yet a third era, the Cold War. She writes:

If Tolkien's legendarium as we have it now is a mythology for England, it is a song about great power and promise in the throes of decline, racked by dissensions, split by factions, perpetually threatened by war, and perpetually at war with itself.

In her view, this is nearer to the vision of George Orwell's Nineteen Eighty-Four than to the "furry-footed escapist fantasy that detractors of The Lord of the Rings have characterized that work as being". She states that the main function of a mythology is "to mirror a culture to itself". She follows this up by asking what the worldview encapsulated in this mythology might be. She notes that Middle-earth is influenced by existing mythologies; and that Tolkien stated that The Lord of the Rings was fundamentally Catholic. All the same, she writes, his mythos is fundamentally unlike Christianity, being "far darker"; the world is saved not by a god's sacrifice but by Eärendil and by Frodo, in a world where "enterprise and creativity [have] gone disastrously wrong". If this is a mythology for England, she concludes, it is a caution not to try to hold on to anything, as it cannot offer salvation; Frodo was unable to let go of the One Ring, and Fëanor could not do so the Silmarils. A shell-shocked England, like a battle-traumatised Frodo, did not know how to let go of empire in a changed world; the advice is, she writes, sound, but as hard for nations to take as for individuals.

=== A mythology for Britain, or Europe ===
Scholars including Fimi have questioned the applicability of the phrase "a mythology for England" to Tolkien's work. She notes that while some of Tolkien's legendarium writings envisaged a frame story about travel backwards in time from modern England, as in the unfinished The Notion Club Papers, The Silmarillion became the ancient history of a region in the north of Europe, far less precisely located. In Fimi's view, Tolkien's enthusiasm for English nationalism had faded by the 1950s. She notes, among other things, that he ended up incorporating the "Celtic" into the legendarium, rather than opposing Englishness with Welshness or Irishness, so he constructed more of a "mythology for Britain" than one purely for England. Further, in her view, Tolkien became increasingly interested in the spiritual aspect of his mythology, such as what happened to the souls of Elves after their deaths: and this "competed for precedence in Tolkien's mind" with the mythology's nationalistic aspect.

== See also ==
- England in Middle-earth
- Impact of Tolkien's Middle-earth writings
