= Elvish Linguistic Fellowship =

Journal

The Elvish Linguistic Fellowship (E. L. F.) is a "Special Interest Group" of the Mythopoeic Society devoted to the study of J. R. R. Tolkien's constructed languages, headed by the computer scientist Carl F. Hostetter. It was founded by Jorge Quiñónez in 1988.

== Organising Tolkien's language writings ==
In 1992, Christopher Tolkien appointed the editors of the E.L.F. to order, edit, and then publish his father's writings concerning his constructed languages. They have worked from photocopies of the materials sent to them and from notes taken by the group's members in the Bodleian and Marquette University Tolkien manuscript archives. This main course of publication is being carried out intermittently in the journal Parma Eldalamberon. There are, however, some writings that are largely independent, and/or whose context has been sufficiently established by Christopher Tolkien's own chronological publication efforts in The History of Middle-earth, and so do not have to be presented in the normal chronological flow of the larger project. Such materials are being published in the journal Vinyar Tengwar. Members include Christopher Gilson, Carl F. Hostetter, Arden R. Smith, Bill Welden, and Patrick H. Wynne.

== Journals ==
The E. L. F. publishes two journals, Vinyar Tengwar, edited by Hostetter, and Parma Eldalamberon, edited by Christopher Gilson. There is an online journal, Tengwestië, edited by Hostetter and Patrick H. Wynne; and it sponsors the Lambengolmor (Quenya: "loremasters") mailing list.

=== Parma Eldalamberon ===
Parma Eldalamberon (broken Quenya for 'The Book of Elven-tongues') was founded in 1971 as a fanzine devoted to a variety of invented literary languages, initially published under the auspices of the Mythopoeic Society, and then taken over by the Elvish Linguistic Fellowship.

In 1995, with the support of Christopher Tolkien and permission of the Tolkien Estate, Parma was reinvented as a series of standalone volumes publishing in full material from Tolkien's manuscripts relating to languages and scripts. Much of this material was previously unpublished or published only in heavily edited form. For example, selections from the "Gnomish Lexicon", published in full in Parma Eldalamberon #11, were published in the Appendices to The Book of Lost Tales.

=== Vinyar Tengwar ===
Vinyar Tengwar (broken Quenya for "News Letters") is a refereed journal (ISSN 1054-7606) published by the Elvish Linguistic Fellowship, dedicated to the study of the languages constructed by J. R. R. Tolkien. The publication is indexed by the Modern Language Association.

Vinyar Tengwar first appeared in 1988, at first edited by Jorge Quiñónez and later taken over by Hostetter. It appeared in bimonthly intervals at first, but after July 1994, issues appeared more irregularly, roughly once a year, until #49 appeared in June 2007; there was then a hiatus until March 2013, when issue #50 appeared. As of 2020, no further issues had been published. The journal was dedicated primarily to the editing of Tolkien's linguistic texts, some of which were mentioned in volumes of The History of Middle-earth, edited by Christopher Tolkien, but not published in that series owing to their specialist nature.

=== Tengwestië ===
Tengwestië is the E.L.F.'s online journal. Its editors are Carl F. Hostetter and Patrick H. Wynne. Articles have appeared intermittently.

=== ELFcon ===
The ELFcon was the annual open conference of the E.L.F., held from 1991 to 1994. Its purpose was to present scholarly papers on any subject relating to Tolkien's invented languages, to discuss the papers amongst the attendees, and to serve as a friendly gathering for a common intellectual pursuit. ELFcons ended in 1994, but Tolkienist conventions organized by Bill Welden continued, renamed to Omentielva, from omentie, Quenya for "meeting". (Note: Frodo uses the word in the phrase Elen síla lúmenn' omentielvo, "A star shines on the hour of our meeting", when he greets the Elves in The Shire.) Its proceedings are published in Arda Philology.
