= Celtic influences on Tolkien =

Effect on Tolkien's legendarium

Celtic influences on Middle-earth:Tolkien's Elves owe something to the Irish Tuatha Dé Danann; their sanctuary of Rivendell recalls Tír na nÓg; the Undying Lands echo Immrama tales; their Sindarin language uses some aspects of Welsh language; and Maedhros and Celebrimbor reflect aspects of Nuada Airgetlám. The tale of Beren and Lúthien echoes the Welsh Mabinogion.

J. R. R. Tolkien derived the characters, stories, places, and languages of Middle-earth from many sources. Among these are the Celtic legends and languages, which for Tolkien were principally Irish and Welsh. He gave multiple conflicting reasons for his liking for Welsh. Tolkien stated directly that he had made use of Welsh phonology and grammar for his constructed Elvish language Sindarin. Scholars have identified multiple legends, both Irish and Welsh, as likely sources of some of Tolkien's stories and characters; thus for example the Noldorin Elves resemble the Irish Tuatha Dé Danann, while the tale of Beren and Lúthien parallels that of the Welsh Culhwch and Olwen. Tolkien chose Celtic names for the isolated settlement of Bree-land, to distinguish it from the Shire with its English names.

Tolkien denied that he had been influenced by the Celtic Arthurian legends, but scholars have likened several of his characters to Arthurian figures, including Gandalf with Merlin and Galadriel with the Lady of the Lake. Further, there are close parallels between the hero Aragorn with his magical sword Andúril and King Arthur and his sword Excalibur.

Interpreters of Tolkien's Middle-earth, including the film-maker Peter Jackson who made the 2001–2003 The Lord of the Rings film trilogy and the composer Howard Shore who created the music for the films, have chosen to portray the Elves using an otherworldly and ethereal modern conception of the Celtic, of the kind mocked by Tolkien.

== Tolkien and language ==
=== English and Welsh ===
The Celtic (blue) and Anglo-Saxon (black) Kingdoms of Britain c. 600. Mercia (centre left) borders the Welsh Powys and Gwynedd (left).

Tolkien's relationship with the Celtic languages is somewhat complex, as he professed to like Welsh but to dislike Old Irish and Scottish Gaelic. He gave several conflicting explanations of why he liked Welsh, and his other favourite languages so much.

One of his statements, made while discussing his invented languages, was simply that liking the sound of a language was a matter of personal taste. Further, he said that he liked Welsh because had a "fondness for nasal consonants, especially the much favoured n", along with the frequent "word-patterns ... made with the soft and less sonorous w and the voiced spirants f and dd contrasted with the nasals." (Note: Tolkien 1983, "A Secret Vice", pp. 198–223)

In his essay "English and Welsh", delivered as a lecture in 1955, he wrote that the "basic pleasure" lay "in the phonetic elements of a language and in the style of their patterns, and then in a higher dimension, pleasure in the association of these word-forms with meanings." (Note: Tolkien 1983, "English and Welsh", pp. 162–197) That pleasure was complex, involving phonetics, style, and association with meaning all at once.

There was a more specific phonaesthetic pleasure which Tolkien was ashamed to mention, but which influenced his choice of names in Middle-earth. Tolkien believed that the sound of a language somehow conveyed meaning, and in some cases pleasure, even to people who did not know the language: to anyone who heard the sound of, for example, Welsh words. The philologist and Tolkien scholar Tom Shippey described that belief as Tolkien's "linguistic heresy", adding that while linguists of his time were largely opposed to it (holding that the association of sound and meaning is wholly arbitrary), evidence has emerged which supports it.

Tolkien gave yet another explanation, namely that Welsh was uniquely attractive to people native to Britain. He wrote that "It is the native language to which in unexplored desire we would still go home". He meant that since Welsh was the language of Britain before the English language arrived, there was a powerful but dormant liking for Welsh among speakers of English: land and language went together. At the same time, Tolkien stated explicitly that he was English, from Worcestershire, a county in what was once the Kingdom of Mercia, and professed a love for its (Germanic) language. Fimi comments that Tolkien was arguing that "history and ancestry or a sense of 'home' and belonging are the main reasons behind personal linguistic tastes." She writes that in that case, Tolkien's Worcestershire roots had put him in touch with Middle and Old English as well as Welsh, and presumably (since the Romans too had occupied the area) also Latin.

=== Sindarin, a constructed language ===
Sindarin's Welsh-style plurals
Welsh i-affection	Sindarin
gair/geiriau (word/words)	galadh/gelaidh (tree/trees)

Tolkien based the phonology and some of the grammar of his constructed Elvish language Sindarin on Literary Welsh. This began as what Tolkien called Goldogrin or "Gnomish", for which he wrote a substantial dictionary and a grammar. Tolkien worked not only to construct individual languages, but to develop the systematic patterns of changes from a language to its descendants, forming families of Elvish languages. In Tolkien's words, "The changes worked on Sindarin [from Common Eldarin] very closely (and deliberately) resemble those which produced the modern and medieval Welsh from ancient Celtic, so that in the result Sindarin has a marked Welsh style, and the relations between it and [the supposedly ancestral language] Quenya closely resemble those between Welsh and Latin." (Note: Tolkien 2007, p. 135.) Nelson Goering analysed this claim, finding it broadly reasonable, if the relationships are allowed to be of different kinds.

Nelson Goering's analysis of Tolkien's claim that Sindarin is to Quenya as Welsh is to Latin
Elvish language	Features	Resemblances	European language
Quenya "snake", a name leuka, Makalaure	High language, "Elven-Latin"; 1) "Used for ceremony, and for high matters of lore and song" 2) Spelling system is Latin-like	Cultural parallels of Quenya and Latin: ancient language, now in learned use	Latin "fountain", "state" fontana, civitat
Sindarin changed more than Quenya from ancient Eldarin lŷg, Maglor	Colloquial language 1) Initial consonant mutations 2) General phonological structure 3) i-mutation (i-umlaut) to form noun plurals	Linguistic parallels of Sindarin and Welsh: Sindarin was designed "to resemble Welsh phonologically"	Welsh borrowed and adapted words from Latin ffynnon, ciwdod

Tolkien further stated that he had given Sindarin "a linguistic character very like (though not identical with) British-Welsh ... because it seems to fit the rather 'Celtic' type of legends and stories told of its speakers", i.e. that he envisaged a "fit" between the language, the character of his Sindarin Elves, and the people in Celtic legends. (Note: Carpenter 2023, #144 to Naomi Mitchison, April 1954)

== Irish ==
=== Tír na nÓg ===
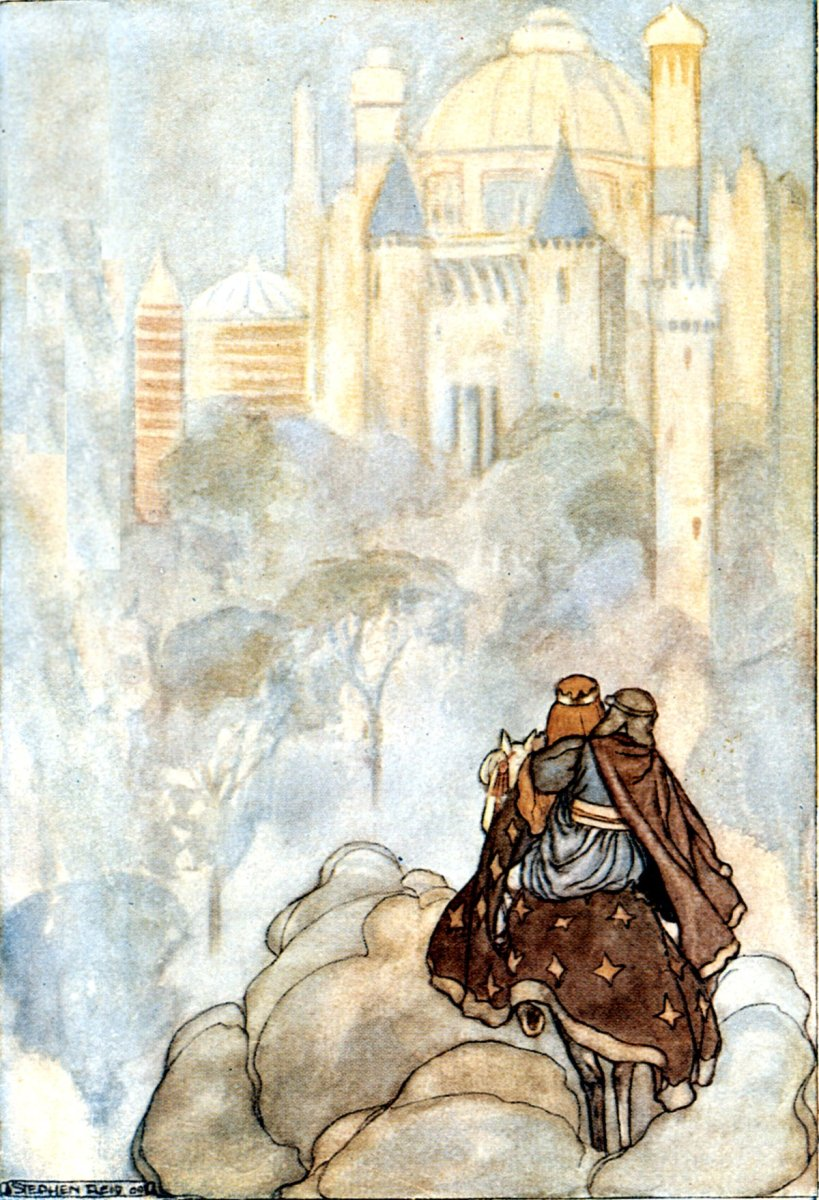
The Elvish sanctuary of Rivendell has been compared to the Celtic Otherworld, shown here in a 1910 illustration by Stephen Reid

Matthew T. Dickerson, in the J. R. R. Tolkien Encyclopedia, writes that Rivendell consistently represents a sanctuary, a place that felt like home, throughout the legendarium. The journalist Jane Ciabattari writes that a major reason for the popularity of Lord of the Rings was the desire for escape among the Vietnam War generation. She compares the military-industrial complex with Mordor, and suggests that they yearned for a place of peace, just as Frodo Baggins felt an "overwhelming longing to rest and remain at peace… in Rivendell". The medievalist Marjorie Burns writes that Rivendell and the other Elvish realm of Lothlórien parallel the Celtic Otherworld (in Irish, Tír na nÓg) in being hard to find, but if one is admitted and welcomed, one crosses a river, symbolising the spiritual transition from the ordinary realm, and "the weary adventurer is transported into a haven of Elven hospitality and delight". There are multiple markers of the transition:

To enter Rivendell is to leave, for a time, the uplands' bleak, mountainous, northerly terrain. First comes the steep descent ...; pines are replaced by beech and oak; the air grows warmer; the first of the elves greet them with laughter and song, and then comes the inevitable water crossing that divides the rest of Middle-earth from the inner core of every Elven realm.

Burns notes that both "Riven" and "dell" suggest a low place into which one must descend; and that a descent is characteristic of Celtic tales of entry into the underground realm of the Tuatha Dé Danann, whose chiefs each rule a burial mound.

=== Tuatha Dé Danann ===
The exile of the Noldor Elves in The Silmarillion has parallels with the story of the Tuatha Dé Danann. These semi-divine beings invaded Ireland from across the sea, burning their ships when they arrived and fighting a fierce battle with the current inhabitants. The Noldor arrived in Middle-earth from Valinor and burned their ships, then turned to fight the Dark Lord Melkor.

=== Nuada Airgetlám ===
Imagemap with clickable links. Apparent influence of archaeological and philological work at Nodens' Temple on Tolkien's Middle-earth legendarium

The loss of a hand by Maedhros, son of Fëanor, parallels the similar mutilation suffered by the king of the Tuatha Dé Danann, Nuada Airgetlám ("Silver Hand"), during the battle with the Firbolg. Nuada received a hand made of silver to replace the lost one, and his later appellation has the same meaning as the Elvish name Celebrimbor: "silver hand" in Sindarin. (Note: Tolkien 1977, p. 357) Tolkien's professional work at the Temple of Nodens, Nuada's precursor, with its associations with a hero, Elves, a ring, and Dwarves, may have been a major stimulus in his creation of his Middle-earth mythology.

=== Imrama tales ===
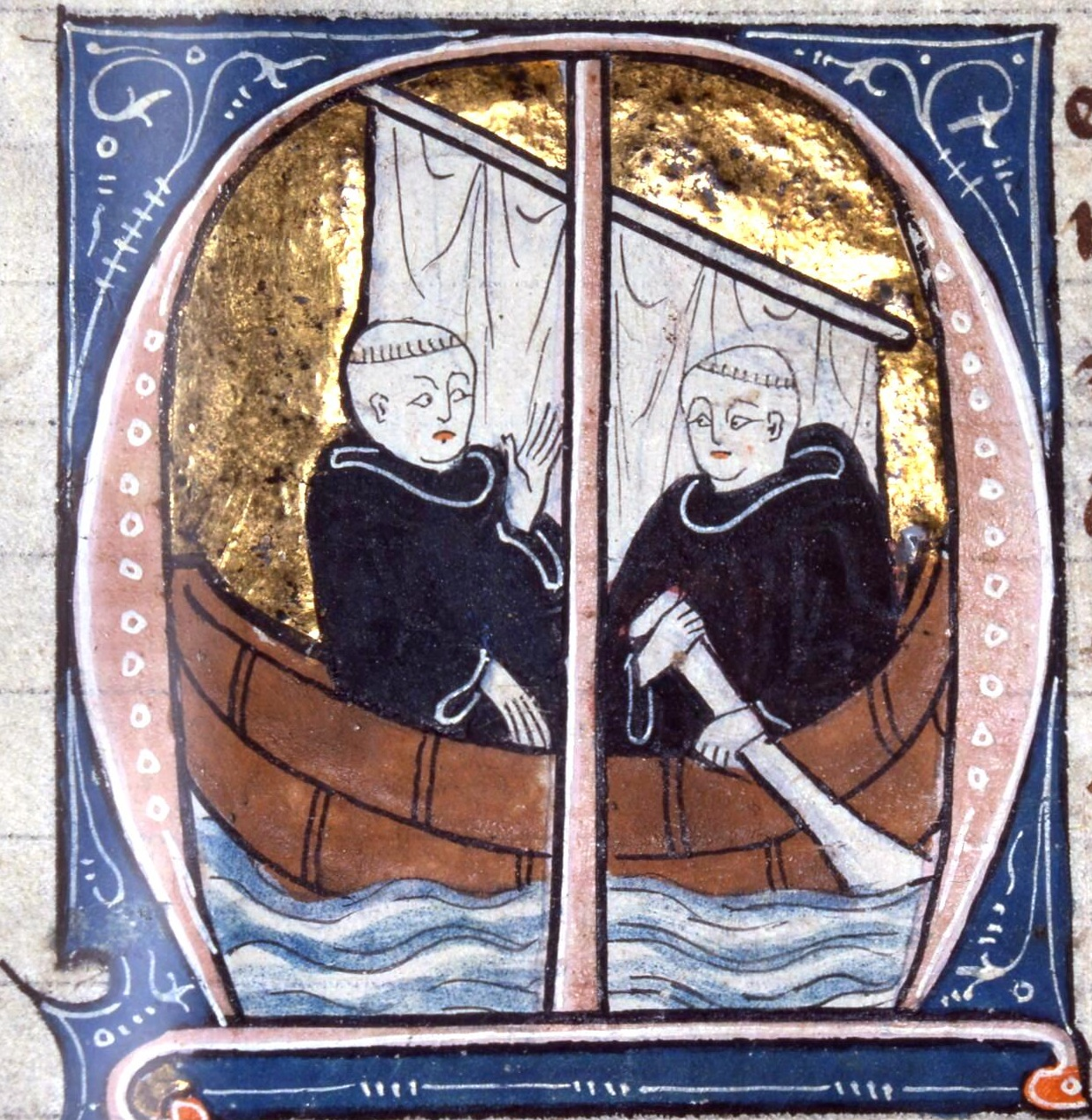
Scholars have compared Tolkien's Valinor to Celtic imrama tales. Here, Saint Brendan sails the seas looking for the "Land of Promise". Gautier de Metz, c. 1304

The scholar of English literature Paul H. Kocher writes that the Undying Lands of the Uttermost West, including Eldamar and Valinor, are "so far outside our experience that Tolkien can only ask us to take it completely on faith." Kocher comments that these lands have an integral place both geographically and spiritually in Middle-earth, and that their closest literary equivalents are in the imrama Celtic tales from the early Middle Ages. The imrama tales describe how Irish adventurers such as Saint Brendan sailed the seas looking for the "Land of Promise". He notes that it is certain that Tolkien knew these stories, since in 1955 he wrote a poem, entitled Imram, about Brendan's voyage.

=== Balor of the Evil Eye ===
Balor of the Evil Eye in Irish mythology has been named as a possible source for the Eye of Sauron. Balor's evil eye, in the middle of his forehead, was able to overcome a whole army. He was king of the evil Fomoire, who like Sauron were evil spirits in hideously ugly bodies. Mordor has been compared to "a Celtic hell" where Balor "ruled the dead from a tower of glass", just as the Undying Lands of Aman resemble the Celtic Earthly Paradise of Tír na nÓg in the furthest (Atlantic) West.

== Welsh ==
=== Place-names ===
Scholars have stated that Tolkien chose the placenames of Bree-land carefully, incorporating Celtic elements into the names to indicate that Bree was older than the Shire, whose placenames are English with Old English elements. The name "Bree" means "hill", and the hill beside the village is named "Bree-hill". The name of the village of Brill, in Buckinghamshire, which Tolkien visited when he was at the University of Oxford and which inspired him to create Bree, (Note: Tolkien 1988, ch. 7, p. 131, note 6. "Bree ... [was] based on Brill ... a place which he knew well".) is constructed exactly the same way: Brill is a modern contraction of Breʒ-hyll. Both syllables are words for the same thing, "hill" – the first is Brythonic (Celtic) and the second Old English. Shippey writes that the name's construction, "hill-hill", is "therefore in a way nonsense, exactly parallel with Chetwode (or 'wood-wood') in Berkshire close by." The first element "Chet" in "Chetwode" derives from the Brythonic ced, meaning "wood". Shippey notes further that Tolkien stated (Note: Tolkien 1955 Appendix F) that he had selected Bree-land placenames – Archet, Bree, Chetwood, and Combe – because they "contained non-English elements", which would make them "sound 'queer', to imitate 'a style that we should perhaps vaguely feel to be “Celtic”'." Shippey comments that this was part of Tolkien's "linguistic heresy", his theory that the sound of words conveyed both meaning and beauty. The philologist Christopher Robinson writes that Tolkien chose a name to "fit not only its designee, but also the phonological and morphological style of the nomenclature to which it belongs, as well as the linguistic scheme of his invented world." In Robinson's view, Tolkien intentionally selected "Celtic elements that have survived in the place names of England" – like bree and chet – to mark them as older than the Shire placenames which embody "a hint of the past" with their English and Old English elements. All of this indicates the "remarkable care and sophistication" with which Tolkien constructed the "feigned history and translation from Westron personal and placenames".

Brill, Chetwode etymologies from Brythonic ('Celtic') and Old English

Placenames of Bree-land, with 'Celtic' elements in Bree, Combe, and Archet in the Chetwood

=== The Mabinogion ===
Authors such as Shippey, Donald O'Brien, Patrick Wynne, and Carl Hostetter have pointed out similarities between the tale of Beren and Lúthien in the Silmarillion, and Culhwch and Olwen, a tale in the Welsh Mabinogion. In both, the male heroes make rash promises after having been stricken by the beauty of non-mortal maidens; both enlist the aid of great kings, Arthur and Finrod; both show rings that prove their identities; and both are set impossible tasks that include, directly or indirectly, the hunting and killing of ferocious beasts (the wild boars, Twrch Trwyth and Ysgithrywyn, and the wolf Carcharoth) with the help of a supernatural hound (Cafall and Huan). Both maidens possess such beauty that flowers grow beneath their feet when they come to meet the heroes for the first time, as if they were living embodiments of spring.

The Mabinogion was part of the Red Book of Hergest, a source of Welsh Celtic lore, which the Red Book of Westmarch, a supposed source of Hobbit-lore, probably imitates.

=== Arthurian legend ===
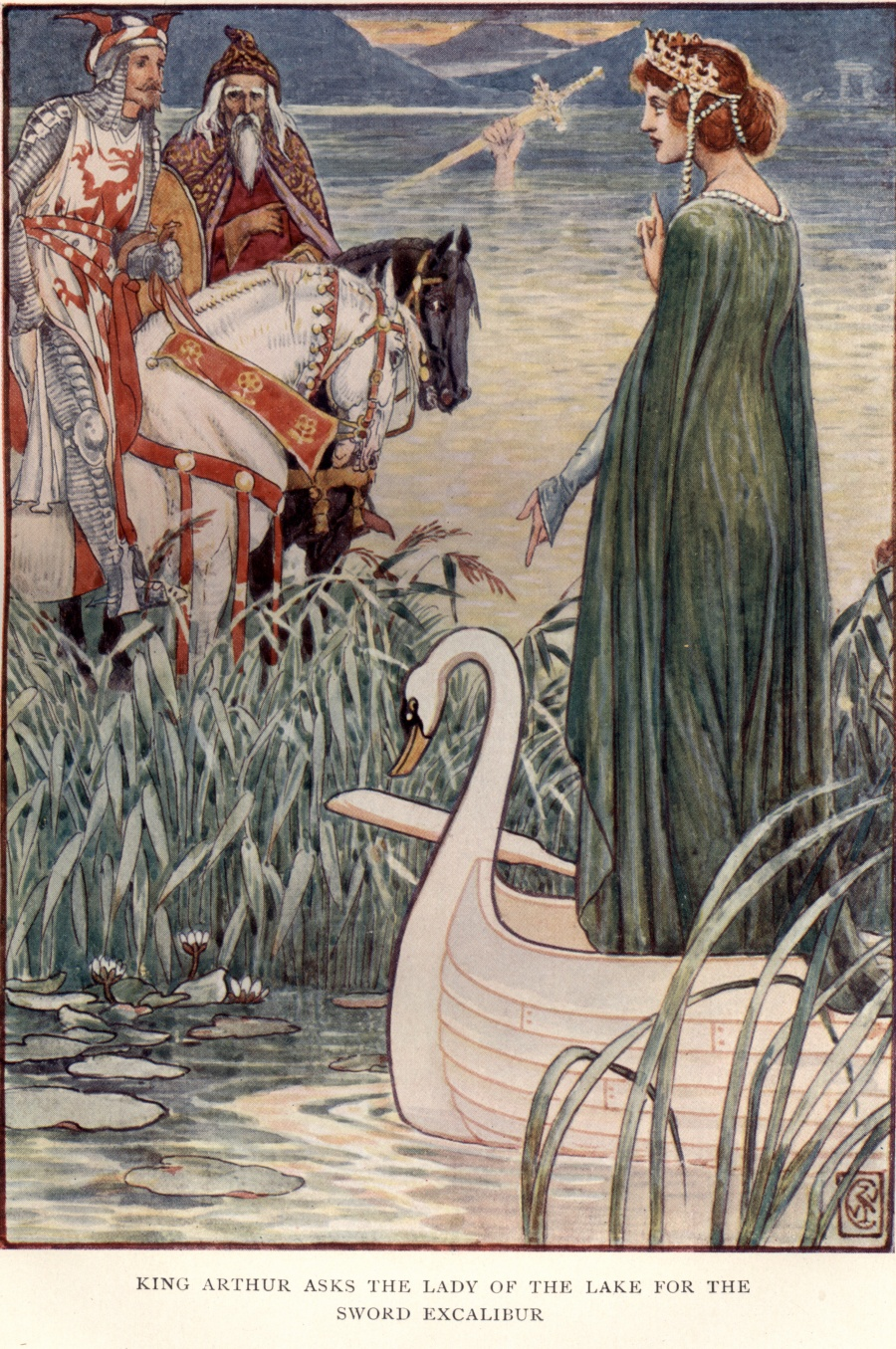
"King Arthur asks the Lady of the Lake for the sword Excalibur". 1911 illustration by Walter Crane

The Arthurian legends are part of the Welsh cultural heritage. Tolkien denied their influence, but scholars have found multiple parallels. The Wizard Gandalf has been compared with Merlin, Frodo and Aragorn with Arthur, and Galadriel with the Lady of the Lake. Flieger has investigated the correlations and Tolkien's creative methods. She points out visible correspondences such as Avalon with Avallónë, and Brocéliande with Broceliand, the original name of Beleriand. Tolkien himself said that Frodo's and Bilbo's departure to Tol Eressëa (also called "Avallon" in the Legendarium) was an "Arthurian ending". Such correlations are discussed in the posthumously published The Fall of Arthur; a section, "The Connection to the Quenta", explores Tolkien's use of Arthurian material in The Silmarillion. Another parallel is between the tale of Sir Balin and that of Túrin Turambar. Though Balin knows he wields an accursed sword, he continues his quest to regain King Arthur's favour. Fate catches up with him when he unwittingly kills his own brother, who mortally wounds him. Turin accidentally kills his friend Beleg with his sword.

Comparison of Narsil / Andúril with Excalibur, the Sword in the Stone
The sword	The Lord of the Rings	Arthurian legend
Is broken	At Elendil's death	When Arthur fights King Pellinore
Delimits an era	Third Age begins as Isildur uses shards of Narsil to cut the One Ring from Sauron's hand; ends as Andúril helps to end Sauron's reign	King Arthur comes to power with Excalibur; Bedivere casts away the sword on Arthur's death
Accompanies	Aragorn leading people of Gondor to victory	King Arthur leading people to victory
Has a magical scabbard	Blade shall not be stained or broken	Wearer shall never lose blood

Tolkien's use of swords with their own names, magical powers, ancient pedigrees, their own histories, and rituals of passage from one hero to the next, is in line with medieval and Arthurian legend. There are multiple parallels between Aragorn with his magical sword and Arthurian legend. The Sword in the Stone is broken, as Narsil is. Just as Excalibur delimits King Arthur's reign, so Narsil delimits the Third Age, beginning when Isildur cuts the Ring from Sauron's hand, and ending when the sword remade as Andúril helps to end Sauron's power and restore Aragorn as King. Both Kings lead their peoples to victory. The sword's magical scabbard, too, which the Elf-queen Galadriel gives to Aragorn as he leaves Lothlórien with the words "The blade that is drawn from this sheath shall not be stained or broken even in defeat", (Note: Tolkien 1954a, book 2, ch. 8 "Farewell to Lórien") parallels Excalibur's sheath, which guarantees that its wearer "shall never lose no blood, be ye never so sore wounded". The elven scabbard describes the sword it was made for: "It was overlaid with a tracery of flowers and leaves wrought of silver and gold, and on it were set in elven-runes formed of many gems the name Andúril and the lineage of the sword."

== Modern Celtic ==
=== Ethereal Elves ===
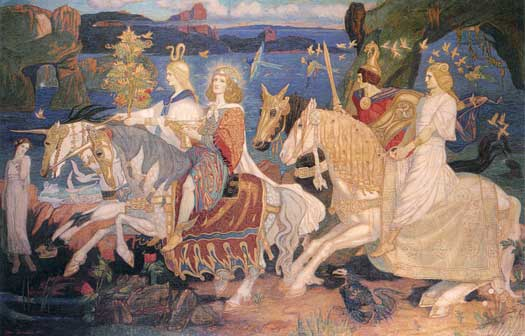
Peter Jackson's film treatment of the Elves in the style of John Duncan's 1911 painting Riders of the Sidhe (pictured), and the modern Celtic music accompanying some of the Elvish film scenes, indicate an "otherworldly" tone very unlike Tolkien's.

In his 2001–2003 The Lord of the Rings film trilogy, Peter Jackson chose to treat the first group of Elves seen by the Hobbit protagonists in the style of John Duncan's 1911 painting Riders of the Sidhe. The film was accompanied by music which similarly gave a "ethereal" (Note: "The Elvish Lament", with Tolkien's Sindarin poem A Elbereth Gilthoniel) modern Celtic feeling for the Elves. Together, these portrayed the Elves with an "otherworldly" tone, very unlike Tolkien's. The composer responsible for the score, Howard Shore, creates what the folklorist and Tolkien scholar Dimitra Fimi calls the "same 'Celtic' feel'" in the music for the Elves in Rivendell. (Note: Rivendell theme Archived 30 July 2017 at the Wayback Machine (melody and arpeggio accompaniment) a theme for female chorus, along with a signature arpeggio accompaniment, which is treated thematically, as well.) Shore had approached the Irish "folk-cum-New Age" singer Enya, whose music represents "Celticity as melancholy over a lost tradition." For example, Enya's song "Lothlórien" on her album Shepherd Moons is an instrumental composition named for the Elvish realm of Lothlórien. In Fimi's view, the "'Celtic' air and ambience" that Jackson uses for the Elves is reinforced by what the film's conceptual designer Alan Lee called "the use of natural forms ... [and] of flowing graceful lines" and "elements of Art Nouveau and Celtic design". Fimi notes that both Tolkien and the historian Malcolm Chapman wrote "mocking[ly]" about the romantic stereotyping of Celts in this way. Tolkien spoke of "the wild incalculable poetic Celt, full of vague and misty imaginations"; Chapman wrote of "high-flown metaphysical and moral conclusions drawn from 'Celtic' art by its admiring critics".

=== Irish peasant Hobbits ===
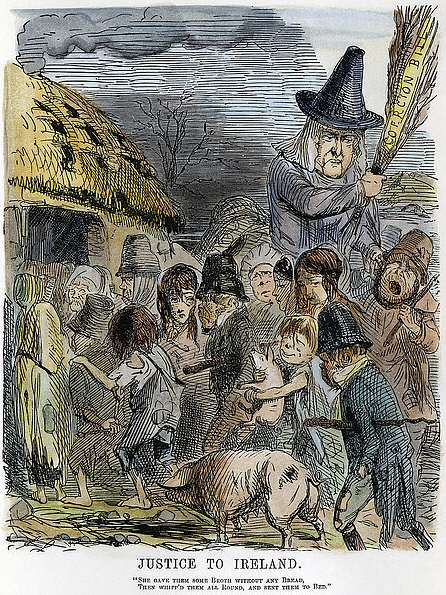
The harfoots in The Lord of the Rings: The Rings of Power speak in Irish accents and have been said to resemble John Leech's Irish peasants, as in his c. 1845 cartoon "Justice to Ireland".

The Tolkien scholar David Bratman "sharp[ly]" criticized Shore's use of modern Celtic music for the Shire and its Hobbits. Bratman stated that the use of instruments like the bodhrán and Celtic harp was inappropriate, given that the Hobbits' homeland was inspired by the English Midlands where Tolkien lived.

The Lord of the Rings: The Rings of Power, a series about events in the Second Age of Middle-earth, has been criticized for its handling of race. Commentators have observed that the Hobbit-like harfoots speak in Irish accents, behave as friendly peasants, and are accompanied by Celtic music; and that they resemble the 19th century caricaturist John Leech's "wildly unflattering" depictions of the Irish in Punch magazine.

== See also ==
- Tolkien and the classical world
- Tolkien and the Norse
- Tolkien's modern sources

== Sources ==
- Adams, Doug (2010). The Music of The Lord of the Rings Films. Éditions Didier Carpentier. ISBN 978-0-7390-7157-1.
- Bratman, David (2010). "Liquid Tolkien: Music, Tolkien, Middle-earth, and More Music". In Eden, Bradford Lee (ed.). Middle-earth Minstrel: Essays on Music in Tolkien. McFarland. ISBN 978-0-7864-4814-2.
- Burns, Marjorie (2005). Perilous Realms: Celtic and Norse in Tolkien's Middle-earth. University of Toronto Press. ISBN 978-0-8020-3806-7.
- Carpenter, Humphrey, ed. (2023) [1981]. The Letters of J. R. R. Tolkien: Revised and Expanded Edition. New York: HarperCollins. ISBN 978-0-35-865298-4.
- Dickerson, Matthew (2013) [2006]. "Rivendell". In Drout, Michael D. C. (ed.). J. R. R. Tolkien Encyclopedia. Routledge. pp. 573–574. ISBN 978-0-415-86511-1.
- Fimi, Dimitra (2010) [2008]. Tolkien, Race and Cultural History: From Fairies to Hobbits. Palgrave. ISBN 978-0-230-27284-2.
- Fimi, Dimitra (2011). "Filming Folklore". In Bogstad, Janice M.; Kaveny, Philip E. (eds.). Picturing Tolkien: Essays on Peter Jackson's The Lord of the Rings Film Trilogy. McFarland. pp. 88–91. ISBN 978-0-7864-8473-7.
- Flieger, Verlyn (2005). Interrupted Music: The Making Of Tolkien's Mythology. Kent State University Press. ISBN 9780873388245.
- Hall, Mark R. (2012). "Gandalf and Merlin, Aragorn and Arthur: Tolkien's Transmogrification of the Arthurian Tradition and Its Use as a Palimpsest for The Lord of the Rings". Inklings Forever: Published Colloquium Proceedings 1997-2016. 8. article 6. OCLC 825553191.
- Hooker, Mark T. (2006). Tolkienian Mathomium: A Collection of Articles on J. R. R. Tolkien and his Legendarium. Llyfrawr. ISBN 978-1-4382-4631-4.
- Kocher, Paul (1974) [1972]. Master of Middle-earth: The Achievement of J.R.R. Tolkien. Penguin Books. pp. 14–18 and 79–82 (Valinor, Eldamar, Undying Lands, origins in Celtic tales). ISBN 0140038779.
- Mills, A. D. (1993). A Dictionary of English Place-Names. Oxford University Press. ISBN 978-0-19-283131-6.
- Salo, David (2004). Gateway to Sindarin: a grammar of an Elvish language from J. R. R. Tolkien's Lord of the Rings. University of Utah Press. ISBN 978-0874809121.
- Shippey, Tom (2005) [1982]. The Road to Middle-Earth: How J. R. R. Tolkien Created a New Mythology (Third ed.). HarperCollins. ISBN 978-0-261-10275-0.
- Tolkien, J. R. R. (1954a). The Fellowship of the Ring. The Lord of the Rings. Boston: Houghton Mifflin. OCLC 9552942.
- Tolkien, J. R. R. (1955). The Return of the King. The Lord of the Rings. Boston: Houghton Mifflin. OCLC 519647821.
- Tolkien, J. R. R. (1977). Christopher Tolkien (ed.). The Silmarillion. Boston: Houghton Mifflin. ISBN 978-0-395-25730-2.
- Tolkien, J. R. R. (1983). The Monsters and the Critics, and Other Essays. London: Allen & Unwin. OCLC 417591085.
- Tolkien, J. R. R. (1988). Christopher Tolkien (ed.). The Return of the Shadow. Boston: Houghton Mifflin. ISBN 978-0-395-49863-7.
- Tolkien, J. R. R. (2007). Gilson, Christopher (ed.). "Words, Phrases and Passages in Various Tongues in The Lord of the Rings". Parma Eldalamberon (17).
- Whetter, K. S.; McDonald, R. Andrew (2006). ""In the Hilt is Fame": Resonances of Medieval Swords and Sword- lore in J.R.R. Tolkien's The Hobbit and The Lord of the Rings". Mythlore. 25 (1). article 2. ISSN 0146-9339.
