= Northern courage in Middle-earth =

Theme in Tolkien's fiction

The medievalist and fantasy author J. R. R. Tolkien derived the characters, stories, places, and languages of Middle-earth from many sources. Among these are Norse mythology, which depicts a reckless bravery that Tolkien named Northern courage. For Tolkien, this was exemplified by the way the gods of Norse mythology knew they would die in the last battle, Ragnarök, but they went to fight anyway. He was influenced, too, by the Old English poems Beowulf and The Battle of Maldon, which both praise heroic courage. He hoped to construct a mythology for England, as little had survived from its pre-Christian mythology. Arguing that there had been a "fundamentally similar heroic temper" in England and Scandinavia, he fused elements from other northern European regions, both Norse and Celtic, with what he could find from England itself.

Northern courage features in Tolkien's world of Middle-earth as a central virtue, closely connected to luck and fate. The protagonists of The Hobbit and The Lord of the Rings are advised by the Wizard, Gandalf, to keep up their spirits, as fate is always uncertain. Tolkien had mixed feelings about heroic courage, as seen in his 1953 The Homecoming of Beorhtnoth Beorhthelm's Son, where he bitterly criticises the English leader Byrhtnoth for overconfidently giving ground to the enemy: the disastrous mistake led to defeat and Byrhtnoth's death.

Scholars have commented that Tolkien was not completely comfortable with Northern courage as a virtue, however much he admired it, as it could become foolish pride, like Beorhtnoth's. The medievalist Tom Shippey has described how it could be combined with a Christian view to suit Tolkien's outlook better. Austin Freeman has added that the resulting Tolkienian virtue, estel, hope that results in action, may also embody the classical virtue of pietas, loyal duty.

== Context ==
J. R. R. Tolkien was a scholar of English literature, a philologist and medievalist interested in language and poetry from the Middle Ages, especially that of Anglo-Saxon England and Northern Europe. His professional knowledge of Beowulf, telling of a pagan world but with a Christian narrator, helped to shape his fictional world of Middle-earth. His intention to create what has been called "a mythology for England" (Note: Carpenter 2023, Letters #131 to Milton Waldman, late 1951) led him to construct not only stories but a fully-formed world, Middle-earth, with languages, peoples, cultures, and history. Among his many influences were medieval languages and literature, including Norse mythology. He is best known as the author of the high fantasy works The Hobbit and The Lord of the Rings, both set in Middle-earth.

== Incorporating the medieval North ==
=== A hybrid mythology for England ===
The medievalist Marjorie Burns writes that "J.R.R. Tolkien's Middle-earth is conspicuously and intricately northern in both ancient and modern ways." She cites a letter to the classics scholar Rhona Beare, where Tolkien wrote that he had not invented the name "Middle-earth", as it had come from "inhabitants of Northwestern Europe, Scandinavia, and England". (Note: Carpenter 2023, Letters #211 to Rhona Beare, 14 October 1958) She states that Tolkien certainly "saw England as rightfully part of this North". She cites his statement in "Beowulf: The Monsters and the Critics" that Beowulf, which she describes as "northern to the hilt", was written in England and "moves in our northern world beneath our northern sky." That does not mean that Norse mythology is the sole source of Tolkien's fantasy; Burns writes that there is "another northernness in his Middle-earth literature, a Celtic northernness." Douglass Parker wrote that Tolkien "has made his world a reflection, or 'pre-reflection' of England before the triumph of Christianity, of the action and reaction between Celt and Teuton... he has ransacked the available mythologies." Middle-earth has been described by scholars including Jane Chance and Tom Shippey as "a mythology for England". In reply to the journalists Charlotte and Denis Plimmer of The Daily Telegraph, who had proposed in a draft article that "Middle-earth .... corresponds spiritually to Nordic Europe", Tolkien wrote (Note: Carpenter 2023, Letters #294 to Charlotte and Denis Plimmer of The Daily Telegraph, 8 February 1967)

Not Nordic, please! A word I personally dislike; it is associated, though of French origin, with racialist theories. Geographically Northern is usually better. But examination will show that even this is inapplicable (geographically or spiritually) to 'Middle-earth'.

— J. R. R. Tolkien, Letter 294, 8 February 1967

Tolkien goes on to deny the poet W. H. Auden's assertion that for him "the North is a sacred direction", saying that instead "The North-west of Europe ... has my affection, but it is not 'sacred', nor does it exhaust my affections."

=== Northern courage "even in our own times" ===
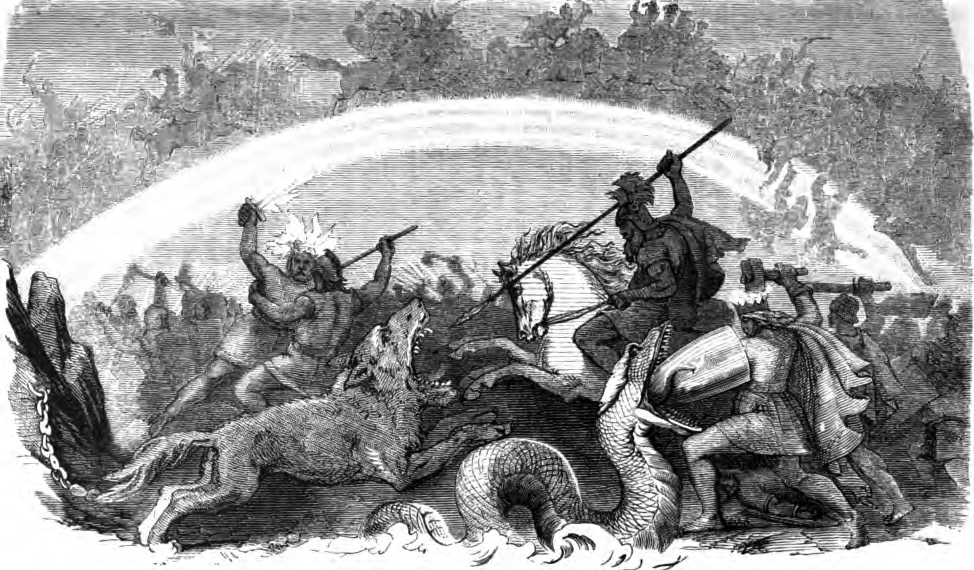
Ragnarök is one of the elements scholars have identified in The Lord of the Rings. Battle of the Doomed Gods by Friedrich Wilhelm Heine, 1882

Among the elements that Tolkien fused to create Middle-earth is Ragnarök; Parker calls the "final cataclysm" of The Lord of the Rings "a Ragnarök, but not one guaranteed to come out all right." Ragnarök is an apocalyptic series of events in Norse mythology, where the gods (Æsir) including Odin, Thor, and Týr fight to their deaths at the hands of the jötnar (giants) and monsters, and with fire and flood the world is drowned. The gods know they will die in the battle, but they go and fight anyway. Burns likens the fight on the bridge of Khazad-dûm to the "flaming rainbow bridge" of Bifröst at Ragnarök; in both cases the adversaries are equally powerful, and both bridges are broken. Tolkien wrote in his 1936 lecture "The Monsters and the Critics" that he was inspired by that final but doomed battle. He stated directly that in his view Northern courage was the most important literary idea from the medieval North:

One of the most potent elements in that fusion [of Heroic and Christian] is the Northern courage: the theory of courage, which is the great contribution of early Northern literature. This is not a military judgement... I refer rather to the central position the creed of unyielding will holds in the North.

— J. R. R. Tolkien, "The Monsters and the Critics"

Tolkien was writing about the poetic quality and meaning of Beowulf, an Old English poem, suggesting a close connection of English and Scandinavian mythology:

Of English pre-Christian mythology we know practically nothing. But the fundamentally similar heroic temper of ancient England and Scandinavia cannot have been founded on (or perhaps rather, cannot have generated) mythologies divergent on this essential point.

— J. R. R. Tolkien, "The Monsters and the Critics"

Tolkien states that whereas "the older southern imagination" (Greek and Roman mythology) has become mere "literary ornament", the Northern vision of courage "has power, as it were, to revive its spirit even in our own times." The Tolkien scholar Tom Shippey comments that Tolkien saw the danger in this, as it could be used for good or ill, and not long after the lecture, the Nazis revived the myth.

=== Among Men and Hobbits ===
"Great horns of the North wildly blowing": Tolkien's account of the arrival of the Riders of Rohan at the Battle of the Pelennor Fields, seen here in Peter Jackson's film The Return of the King, has been read as exemplifying the "heroic Northern world".

Burns writes that the theme of courageous action in the face of inevitable loss in The Lord of the Rings is borrowed from the Old Norse world view which emphasises "imminent or threatening destruction". Even the home-loving Hobbits Frodo and Sam share this courage, knowing they have little prospect of returning home from their desperate quest to Mount Doom. Similarly, Janet Brennan Croft writes that the Hobbit Pippin may feel his part in the war to be "far from glorious" but he, like his friend Merry, is courageous, carrying on without hope.

Shippey states that Tolkien announces the arrival of the Riders of Rohan at the Battle of the Pelennor Fields with the phrase "Great horns of the North wildly blowing", (Note: Tolkien 1955, book 5, ch. 4 "The Siege of Gondor") meaning bravado and recklessness", and exemplifying the "heroic Northern world". The scholar of film Gwendolyn Morgan comments that Peter Jackson's films "successfully preserve the theory of Northern courage." She writes that this is "most obvious" in the culture of the Riders of Rohan, both in Tolkien's book and Jackson's films, as the heroes echo Ragnarök in their "courage to face horror and determination to do what is right that lies at the heart of Northern courage". Morgan sees this "most completely" in Jackson's two major battles, Helm's Deep and the Pelennor, citing the words of Rohan's King Théoden as he rides out to fight at Helm's Deep, expecting death:

Aragorn: "Ride out. Ride out and meet them."
Théoden: "For death and glory!"
Aragorn: "For Rohan."
Théoden: "Yes! The horn of Helm Hammerhand will sound in the Deep one last time... Fell deeds await. Now for wrath, now for ruin, and the red dawn!"

Morgan further quotes Théoden's words before the Pelennor, stating that the battle "again exhibits the Rohirrim's Northern courage:

A captain: "Too few have come. We cannot defeat the armies of Mordor."
Théoden: "No, we cannot; but we will meet them nonetheless."

At the battle, Théoden orders his men to charge the enemy. Jackson adapts Tolkien's words:

Théoden: "Arise, arise, Riders of Théoden!
spear shall be shaken, shield shall be splintered,
a sword-day, a red day, ere the sun rises! (Note: Compare the Völuspá: —skeggǫld, skálmǫld —skildir ro klofnir— / vindǫld, vargǫld— áðr verǫld steypiz. (—an axe age, a sword age —shields are riven— / a wind age, a wolf age— before the world goes headlong.))
Ride now, ride now, ride! Ride for ruin and the world's ending!
Death! Death! Death!
Forth Eorlingas!"

and the Riders respond, shouting "Death!" as they charge.

The medievalist Elizabeth Solopova contrasts the steady Northern courage of the hero and future king Aragorn with the old Steward of Gondor, Denethor, who completely lacks this quality. Shippey observes that Denethor's other opposite, King Théoden of Rohan, lives by Northern courage, and dies through Denethor's despair.

Comparison of three leaders in The Lord of the Rings
Character	Behaviour	Result
Aragorn	consistently courageous	becomes King
Denethor	seeks knowledge, despairs	commits suicide, drawing the Wizard Gandalf away from battle
Théoden	lives by Northern courage	dies in battle, partly through Denethor's diversion of Gandalf

=== Among Elves: Fëanor versus Galadriel ===
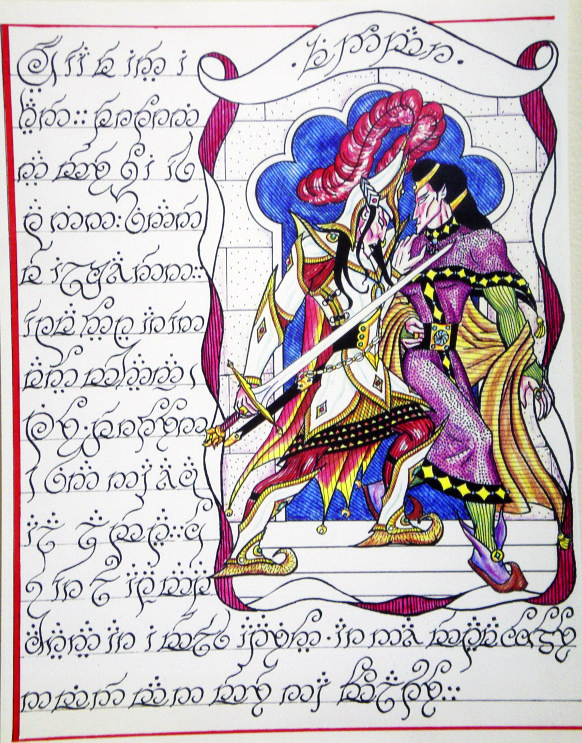
First Age Elves such as Fëanor (left) and Fingolfin expressed Northern courage in different ways. Artwork by Tom Loback, 2007

Richard Gallant, in the Journal of Tolkien Research, discusses how Northern courage is expressed by the Elves of the First Age of Middle-earth. He contrasts the actions of Fëanor and Galadriel, which he sees as exemplifying the "vices and virtues [respectively] of the Germanic ethos", the heroic framework in which both their families (Fëanorians and Fingolfins) operate. Fëanor unwisely chooses to rebel against the Valar, and fate accordingly follows him and his sons as they swear to do anything to regain the Silmarils. Gallant sees Galadriel as a rebel like Fëanor, but unlike him is able to turn "the fatalistic and heroic Elvish narrative to eucatastrophe through [her own] free will". Specifically, she refuses to take the One Ring when Frodo offers it. In Gallant's view, Galadriel is living out the Fingolfins' ethos as stated by Finrod Felagund to Andreth of the Edain: "To overthrow the Shadow, or if that may not be, to keep it from spreading once more over all Middle-earth – to defend the Children of Eru, Andreth, all the Children and not the proud Eldar only!" (Note: Tolkien 1993, pp. 310–311) Gallant characterises this "ideology" as the Elves' heroic acceptance of "the long defeat". This is the process of decline and fall that Tolkien built into his legendarium, its only optimistic note being "the possibility of heroism". Both the Fëanorians' and the Fingolfins' ideologies fit within the "Northern courage framework", Gallant states, the one choosing its possessiveness, the other its endurance. He notes that Christina Scull and Wayne G. Hammond define Northern courage as the "ethic of endurance and resistance" of the Northern warrior.

== Courage, luck, and fate ==
Tolkien made multiple uses of the Old English poem Beowulf in his Middle-earth writings; its Northern courage appears as a central virtue in The Lord of the Rings. One example is Beorn in The Hobbit; he exudes heroic courage, being ferocious, rude, and cheerful, characteristics that reflect his huge inner self-confidence. The theory of courage is closely related to the Old English view of luck and fate that Tolkien adopted for Middle-earth. Beowulf defines its view of this in a proverb (lines 572b–573):

Wyrd oft nereð unfӕgne eorl, / þonne his ellen deah
"Fate often spares the man who isn't doomed, as long as his courage holds."

Shippey remarks that this might seem to make no sense – how can fate spare a doomed man, and "aren't fate and doom much the same thing?" He answers his own question by stating that the Beowulf proverb is "an excellent guide for future conduct. Keep your spirits up, as no one can be sure what is fated". He notes further that in The Lord of the Rings the Wizard Gandalf repeatedly gives just this advice. In The Two Towers, Tolkien has the Dwarf Gimli say a version of the Old English proverb to the young Hobbits Merry and Pippin, on meeting up with them after a series of dangerous adventures at the ruined walls of Isengard:

"Luck served you there, but you seized your chance with both hands, one might say." (Note: Tolkien 1954, book 3, ch. 9 "Flotsam and Jetsam")

Burns states that Tolkien admired a certain Englishness, "the courage and tenacity ... in his fellow countrymen during the First World War ... to recognize duty and carry resolutely through." She adds that "It is the same with the hobbits, who return and rebuild the Shire. Though it is their complacent and comfort-seeking qualities that stand out most consistently, a warrior's courage or an Elf's sensitivity can arise in hobbits as well."

== Courage, not pride ==
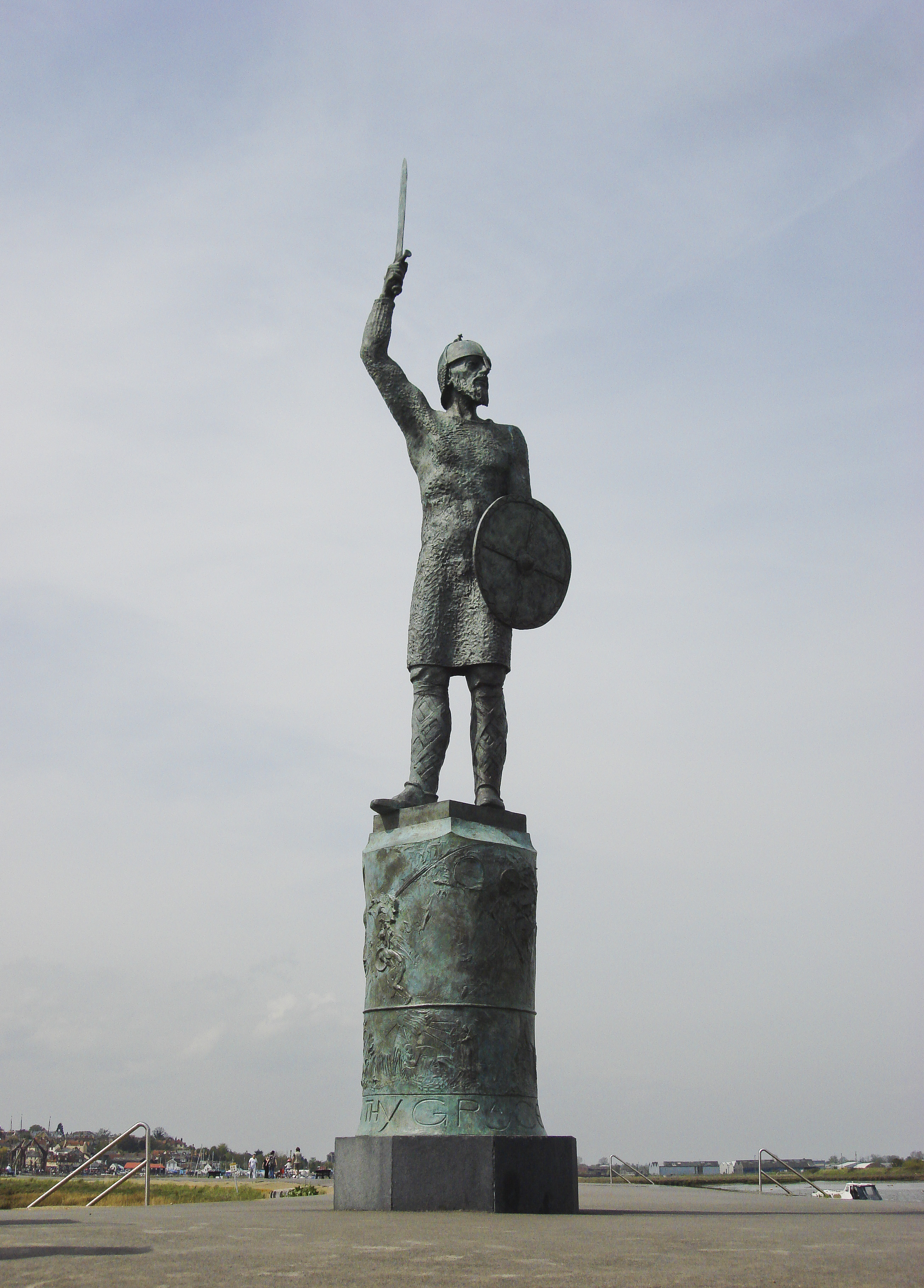
Byrhtnoth, prideful loser of the 991 Battle of Maldon

Writing in Tolkien Studies, Mary R. Bowman notes "the indomitability that Tolkien saw as the defining quality of Northern courage". She comments that Gandalf's courageous blocking of the monstrous Balrog on the Bridge of Khazad-Dûm was a "pointed response" to the Old English poem The Battle of Maldon, where the English leader Byrhtnoth wrongly and disastrously gives way to the invaders, allowing them to land from their ships and form up for battle. She writes that in the 1936 talk The Monsters and the Critics, Tolkien praises the Northern courage that the poem describes, admiring its "'indomitability', the ability to persevere with the knowledge that sooner or later defeat will come." She notes that around the same time, in The Hobbit, Tolkien has Bilbo Baggins voice "a more critical view of the brand of heroism articulated in Maldon". Watching the Battle of Five Armies, he accepts he may be in "a last desperate stand", and thinks "I have heard songs of many battles, and I have always understood that defeat may be glorious. It seems very uncomfortable, not to say distressing. I wish I was well out of it."

Thomas Honegger argues that in his 1953 alliterative verse play The Homecoming of Beorhtnoth Beorhthelm's Son, Tolkien bitterly criticises Byrhtnoth's overconfident pride, casting it in a wholly negative light. George Clark writes that Tolkien's reworking of the Old English poem specifically "chastises" Beorhtnoth for his pride, as well as criticising the Anglo-Saxon heroic ideals of the pursuit of fame and wealth. Shippey calls Tolkien's condemnation of Byrhtnoth "an act of parricide" against his Old English literary forebears, in which he "sacrifice[d]" what he had earlier described as "the northern heroic spirit". Amber Dunai notes Shippey's criticism of Tolkien's linking of Northern courage and "chivalry" as anachronistic, since in Shippey's words "[chivalry is] an attitude for which there is no evidence in England for perhaps another 150 years [after The Battle of Maldon]." She states that Northern courage "after all, is recognizable as such because exploits like Beorhtnoth’s were consistently represented in early medieval poetry as courageous and appealing." Bowman comments that Tolkien struggles with the poem's heroism, but in his essay after the poem "hints at the possibility of rehabilitating that spirit".

Tolkien's alliterative verse response to the heroism of The Battle of Maldon
The Battle of Maldon, lines 312–313
From The Homecoming of Beorhtnoth

Torhthelm: It's dark! It's dark, and doom coming!
Is no light left us? A light kindle,
and fan the flame! Lo! Fire now wakens,
hearth is burning, house is lighted,
men there gather. Out of the mists they come
through darkling doors whereat doom waiteth.
Hark! I hear them in the hall chanting:
stern words they sing with strong voices.

Hige sceal þe heardra, heorte þe cenre,
mod sceal þe mare, þe ure mægen lytlað.

(He chants) "Heart shall be bolder, harder be purpose,
more proud the spirit as our power lessens!
Mind shall not falter nor mood waver,
though doom shall come and dark conquer."

There is a great bump and jolt of the cart.

Hey! What a bump, Tida! My bones are shaken,
and my dreams shattered. It's dark and cold.

Lynn Forest-Hill, in Tolkien Studies, writes that Tolkien's response to Maldon "asserts unequivocally the connection between arrogance in military strategy and its horrifying aftermath". She compares Tolkien's attitude to Byrhtnoth's ofermod, "overmastering pride", with the flawed character Boromir. Where Byrhtnoth is simply guilty of "flawed leadership", Boromir is dangerously proud and overconfident, but ultimately redeems himself by "repent[ing] his evil act" and fighting to the death to save the young Hobbits.

== Part of a complex of virtues ==
=== Both Northern and Christian ===
And in that very moment, away behind in some courtyard of the city, a cock crowed. Shrill and clear he crowed, recking nothing of war nor of wizardry, welcoming only the morning that in the sky far above the shadows of death was coming with the dawn. And as if in answer there came from far away another note. Horns, horns, horns, in dark Mindolluin's sides they dimly echoed. Great horns of the north wildly blowing. Rohan had come at last.

— The Return of the King, book 5, ch. 4 "The Siege of Gondor"

The arrival of the riders of Rohan at the Battle of the Pelennor Fields is heralded, Shippey writes, by two calls: a cockerel crowing as the morning comes, and "as if in answer ... great horns of the North wildly blowing". The cock-crow recalls multiple accounts in Western literature that speak, Shippey writes, of renewed hope and life after death; of the call which told Simon Peter that he had denied Christ three times, and that there would, despite him, be a resurrection; of the cock-crow in Milton's Comus that would "be some solace yet"; of the cockerel in the Norse Ódáinsakr, killed and thrown over a wall by the witch, but crowing to King Hadding a moment later. As for the horns of Rohan, in Shippey's view "their meaning is bravado and recklessness", and in combination with the cock-crow, the message is that "he who fears for his life shall lose it, (Note: Compare Matthew 10:39 "Whoever finds their life will lose it, and whoever loses their life for my sake will find it.") but that dying undaunted is no defeat; furthermore that this was true before the Christian myth that came to explain why". In The Monsters and the Critics, Tolkien quoted W. P. Ker's The Dark Ages:

The Northern Gods have an exultant extravagance in their warfare which makes them more like Titans than Olympians; only they are on the right side, though it is not the side that wins. The winning side is Chaos and Unreason [Tolkien's italics] – mythologically, the monsters – but the gods, who are defeated, think that defeat no refutation.

— Tolkien, quoting W. P. Ker, The Dark Ages

Shippey adds that warhorns exemplify the "heroic Northern world", echoing the moment in Beowulf when Ongentheow's Geats, trapped all night, hear the horns of Hygelac's men coming to rescue them.

=== At once Classical, Northern, and Christian ===
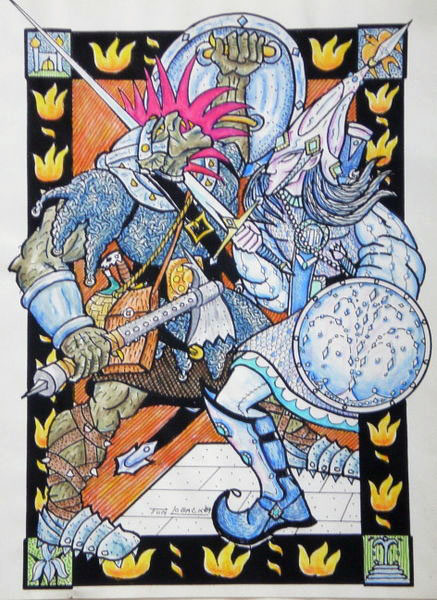
"Stubborn-valiant": the Elf-lord Ecthelion fighting to the death during the fall of Gondolin. Artwork by Tom Loback, 2007

Austin Freeman, writing in Tolkien and the Classical World, argues that "Tolkien blends [Virgilian] pietas, the indomitable will, and Christian pistis ('faith/trust') into a distinctive and heady mix: thus, the form of Northern bravery is filled with the content of Classical pietas and driven by a final end of pistis." This creates, Freeman writes, the Tolkienian virtue of estel, a form of hope that embodies "active trust and loyalty". Freeman notes that Tolkien describes the Elf-lord Ecthelion's resistance, fighting the Balrog Gothmog and his Orcs to the death during the fall of Gondolin, as "the most stubborn-valiant" of the tales of the Noldor, commenting that the "hyphenated word might in fact be a direct authorial gloss on the idea of Northern courage."
