= Scott Burns =

Scott Burns may refer to:

- Scott Burns (footballer) (born 1974), Australian rules footballer
- Scott Burns (geologist) (born 1940), American geologist at Portland State University
- Scott Burns (newspaper columnist), American journalist
- Scott Burns (music producer), American computer engineer and music producer
- Scott Burns (politician), American politician
- Scott Z. Burns (born 1962), American screenwriter, producer, and director

== See also ==
- Scott Byrne (died 2005), American musician
- Scotsburn (disambiguation)
