= Tolkien and the Invention of Myth =

Scholarly book

Tolkien and the Invention of Myth: A Reader
- First edition, with painting The Gates of Morning by Ted Nasmith
- Editor: Jane Chance
- Author: see text
- Language: English
- Subject: Tolkien studies
- Genre: Scholarly essays
- Publisher: University Press of Kentucky
- Publication date: 2004
- Media type: Paperback
- Pages: 340
- ISBN: 978-0-8131-2301-1

Tolkien and the Invention of Myth: A Reader is a 2004 collection of scholarly essays on J. R. R. Tolkien's writings on Middle-earth, edited by Jane Chance. It includes chapters from the established Tolkien scholars Marjorie Burns, Michael D. C. Drout, Verlyn Flieger, Gergely Nagy, Tom Shippey, and Richard C. West. It was warmly welcomed by critics, though some of the student contributions were considered less useful than the revised journal articles, conference papers and lectures by the more experienced essayists.

== Background ==
Tolkien and the Invention of Myth, published by the University Press of Kentucky in 2004, is the second in a series of three essay collections on Tolkien, the other two being the 2003 Tolkien the Medievalist and the 2005 Tolkien's Modern Middle Ages. The essays are based on a mix of conference papers, lectures, and updated revisions of influential journal articles. Ten of the revised conference papers were first presented in 2002 at the International Congress on Medieval Studies. The lectures were first delivered by Tom Shippey in 1996 and by Michael D. C. Drout in 2003. The four journal articles were first published in the 1980s and 1990s.

Chad Engbers writes in The Lion and the Unicorn that the essay authors include "the usual suspects", a small number of well-known Tolkien scholars – here "Nagy, Shippey, Burns, Drout, Flieger, and West" – as well as junior scholars and established scholars from outside of Tolkien studies.

== Chapter summaries ==
The essays
Part	Author	Discipline	Title	Summary
Introduction	Jane Chance	Medievalist, Tolkien studies	A 'Mythology for England'?	The editor states that it is well known that Tolkien "yearned to create a 'mythology for England'" that would do what mythologies had done for other countries in Europe, but that he was not comfortable with Arthurian legend as it was contaminated by French notions of chivalry, which he "loathed", and it was uncertain "where he turned for models". Accordingly the collection examines his methodology, and then his classical, his Old Norse, his Old English, and his Finnish influences.
Backgrounds: Folklore, Religion, Magic, and Language	Michaela Baltasar	Fiction	Tolkien and the rediscovery of myth	Baltasar explores Tolkien's belief in the power of language to create myth, as opposed to the theories of myth held by the folklorist Andrew Lang and the philologist Max Müller.
Backgrounds: Folklore, Religion, Magic, and Language	Catherine Madsen	Novelist	Light from an invisible lamp: natural religion in The Lord of the Rings	Madsen explains how Tolkien creates a "religious feeling" and a sort of natural religion without directly mentioning Christianity.
Backgrounds: Folklore, Religion, Magic, and Language	Mary E. Zimmer	British literature	Creating and re-creating worlds with words: the religion and the magic of language in The Lord of the Rings	Zimmer discusses Tolkien's use of language to create the seemingly solid reality of Middle-earth. She discusses the use of names, including true names, with the implication that names and the things they denote are causally linked.
Backgrounds: Folklore, Religion, Magic, and Language	David Lyle Jeffrey	English	Tolkien as philologist	Jeffrey examines Tolkien's philological use of names, complete with guidance for translators and others, revealing how Tolkien understood language to work.
Tolkien and Ancient Greek and Classical and Medieval Latin	Gergely Nagy	Tolkien studies	Saving the myths : the re-creation of mythology in Plato and Tolkien	Nagy points up several parallels between how Plato and Tolkien viewed myth. Both wrote myths of their own as if they were real traditions, creating an impression of depth.
Tolkien and Ancient Greek and Classical and Medieval Latin	Sandra Ballif Straubhaar	Germanic studies	Myth, late Roman history, and multiculturalism in Tolkien's Middle-Earth	Straubhaar examines the influence of late Roman history on Middle-earth, as seen in the relationship between the civilised Gondor and the barbarian Rohan, paralleling ancient Rome's growing admiration for its energetic barbarian neighbours, as seen in Tacitus's history.
Tolkien and Ancient Greek and Classical and Medieval Latin	Jen Stevens	Inklings	From catastrophe to eucatastrophe: J.R.R. Tolkien's transformation of Ovid's Mythic Pyramus and Thisbe into Beren and Lúthien	Stevens explores the parallels between the tale of Pyramus and Thisbe as told in Ovid's Metamorphoses, and Tolkien's central story of Beren and Lúthien.
Tolkien and Ancient Greek and Classical and Medieval Latin	Kathleen E. Dubs	Humanities	Providence, fate, and chance: Boethian philosophy in The Lord of the Rings	Dubs relates Boethius's On the Consolation of Philosophy to Tolkien's presentation of luck, free will, and fate in The Lord of the Rings.
Tolkien and Old Norse	Tom Shippey	Philologist, Tolkien studies	Tolkien and the appeal of the pagan: Edda and Kalevala	Shippey explains how the Icelandic Prose Edda and the Finnish Kalevala served Tolkien as models of writings firmly "rooted" in the pagan mythologies of their times and places, complete with the Edda's "northern courage" and the Kalevala's sympathy and sadness.
Tolkien and Old Norse	Marjorie J. Burns	Medievalist	Norse and Christian gods: the integrative theology of J.R.R. Tolkien	Burns explores parallels between the Norse gods and The Silmarillion's Valar. The mapping is complex, as for instance Odin's dark side is inherited by Melkor, while his brighter aspects go to Manwë.
Tolkien and Old Norse	Andy Dimond	Tolkien studies	The twilight of the elves: Ragnarök and the end of the Third Age	Dimond relates the Norse Ragnarök to the War of the Ring.
Tolkien and Old Norse	Andrew Lazo	Inklings	Gathered round northern fires: the imaginative impact of the Kolbítar	Lazo explores the impact of Tolkien's Oxford Old Norse study group the Kolbítar on how Tolkien and C. S. Lewis developed.
Tolkien and Old English	Michael D. C. Drout	English, Tolkien studies	A mythology for Anglo-Saxon England	Drout sets out how Tolkien's study of Anglo-Saxon literature and culture was related to his "pseudohistory", which "solved a number of historical and literary puzzles and was in itself aesthetically pleasing", even though Tolkien did not actually believe it. Drout suggests that Tolkien then deliberately covered over the links between Middle-earth and Anglo-Saxon history.
Tolkien and Old English	John R. Holmes	English	Oaths and oathbreaking: analogues of Old English Comitatus in Tolkien's myth	Holmes studies Tolkien's use of sworn oaths in Middle-earth, relating this to Germanic and Anglo-Saxon culture.
Tolkien and Old English	Alexandra Bolintineanu	Medievalist	On the borders of old stories: enacting the past in Beowulf and The Lord of the Rings	Bolintineanu compares the purpose of the Beowulf poet's use of embedded stories with Tolkien's in The Lord of the Rings. The old tales can offer moral guidance, comfort, and a doomed grandeur.
Tolkien and Finnish	Verlyn Flieger	Medievalist; Tolkien studies	A mythology for Finland: Elias Lönnrot and J.R.R. Tolkien as mythmakers	Flieger explores why Tolkien should have decided to create a mythology for England, though his would be fictional. She proposes that the inspiration of Lönnrot, and the resulting Kalevala, were both important to Tolkien. She suggests further that Tolkien liked the response of artists to the Kalevala, and stated that he hoped artists would respond to his own mythology.
Tolkien and Finnish	Richard C. West	Tolkien studies	Setting the rocket off in story: the Kalevala as the germ of Tolkien's legendarium	West too looks at the Kalevala, describing how the Finnish language nfluenced his Elvish language of Quenya, and how the mythology seeped into "his mind-set". One concrete similarity is the tragic tale of Túrin, whose character is developed from that of Kullervo.
Tolkien and Finnish	David Elton Gay	Folklore	J.R.R. Tolkien and the Kalevala: some thoughts on the Finnish origins of Tom Bombadil and Treebeard	Gay argues that the character Väinämöinen in the Kalevala influenced both the spirit of place Tom Bombadil in the Old Forest, and the tree-giant, the Ent Treebeard, in Fangorn Forest.

== Reception ==
Chad Engbers writes in The Lion and the Unicorn that the well-known Tolkien scholars write knowledgeably in a style "more expository than polemical". A second category, the weakest in Engbers's view, comprises the junior scholars such as Baltasar, Dimond, and Lazo. He finds Baltasar's essay "like a very respectable graduate paper", whereas Dimond says "too little" and Lazo "says too much". A third category is of scholars and authors with established reputations outside Tolkien studies. He says that Jeffrey writes freshly and well on philology, while the novelist Madsen writes an "incisive and honest" assessment of Christianity in The Lord of the Rings. Engbers concludes that while not all the essays are specially useful, "the volume's virtues outnumber its vices".

Carol Leibiger in Journal of the Fantastic in the Arts writes that Drout "elegantly and convincingly" shows Tolkien's way of linking to the Anglo-Saxon period, spanning its culture, history, and language, so as to construct a "pseudohistorical mythology" for England. She finds Nagy's comparison of Tolkien's use of myth with Plato's "fascinating", whereas she feels that Straubhaar's use of two "rabid and uni[n]formed" critics (for her discussion of Tolkien and race) spoils her essay. Of the student essays, she writes that Lazo is "long-winded", full of self-references and mistakes. Leibiger concludes that the volume assembles numerous "important studies of the sources of Tolkien's legendarium".

Margaret Sinex writes in Tolkien Studies calls the volume "a superb collection of essays that illuminates Tolkien's own understanding of the nature and function of myth and his process of mythmaking." In her view, it helps the reader to grasp "Tolkien's belief in the creative, generative potency of language". She finds "appealing" Zimmer's essay on Tolkien's "verbal magic"; it explores incantations or "word magic"; two types of "name magic", involving a taboo on the use of proper names, and the changing of a name when a person's nature changes; and the "true name" which causes what it names. Straubhaar's essay is in Sinex's view "convincing" in its argument that the dynastic marriages between Gondor and Rohan reflect the later Roman Empire's "gradual acceptance of mixed marriages with barbarian tribes on their empire's distant borders."

== See also ==
- Tolkien's Art: A 'Mythology for England' – an earlier book about Middle-earth by Jane Chance
- Understanding The Lord of the Rings – a collection of essays edited by Rose Zimbardo and Neil D. Isaacs

== Sources ==
- Chance, Jane, ed. (2004). Tolkien and the Invention of Myth: A Reader. University Press of Kentucky. ISBN 978-0-8131-2301-1.
- Engbers, Chad (2006). "Tolkien and the Invention of Myth: A Reader (review)". The Lion and the Unicorn. 30 (1): 134–138. doi:10.1353/uni.2006.0003.
- Leibiger, Carol A. (2005). "Tolkien and the Invention of Myth: A Reader, edited by Jane Chance". Journal of the Fantastic in the Arts. 16 (2): 158–161.
- Sinex, Margaret (2006). "Tolkien and the Invention of Myth: A Reader (review)". Tolkien Studies. 3 (1): 205–217. doi:10.1353/tks.2006.0030.
