= Tolkien and the Norse =

Effect on Tolkien's legendarium

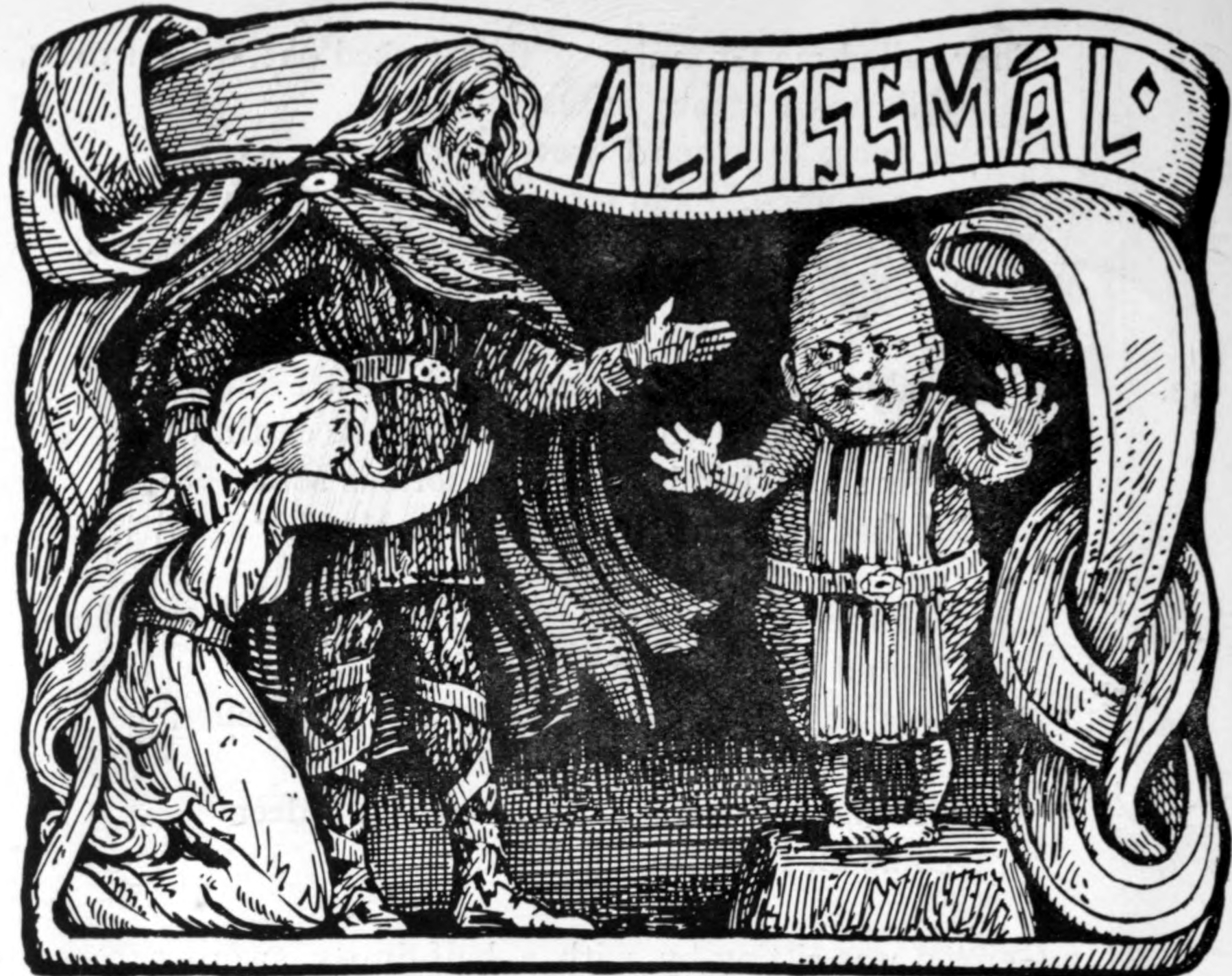
The god Thor talks to the dwarf Alviss to prevent him from marrying his daughter Þrúðr; at dawn Alviss turns to stone, just as Tolkien's stone Trolls do in The Hobbit. Drawing by W. G. Collingwood, 1908

J. R. R. Tolkien derived the characters, stories, places, and languages of Middle-earth from many sources. Among these are Norse mythology, seen in his Dwarves, Wargs, Trolls, Beorn and the barrow-wight, places such as Mirkwood, characters including the Wizards Gandalf and Saruman and the Dark Lords Morgoth and Sauron derived from the Norse god Odin, magical artefacts like the One Ring and Aragorn's sword Andúril, and the quality that Tolkien called "Northern courage". The powerful Valar, too, somewhat resemble the pantheon of Norse gods, the Æsir.

== Places ==
=== Middle-earth ===
In ancient Germanic mythology, the world of Men is known by several names. The Old English middangeard is cognate with the Old Norse Miðgarðr of Norse mythology, transliterated to modern English as Midgard. The original meaning of the second element, from proto-Germanic gardaz, was "enclosure", cognate with English terms for enclosed spaces "yard", "garden", and "garth". Middangeard was assimilated by folk etymology to "middle earth". (Note: Carpenter 2023, #165 to the Houghton Mifflin Co., 30 June 1955) It was at the centre of nine worlds in Norse mythology.

Tolkien adopted the word "Middle-earth" to mean the central continent in his imagined world, Arda; it first appears in the prologue to The Lord of the Rings: "Hobbits had, in fact, lived quietly in Middle-earth for many long years before other folk even became aware of them". (Note: Tolkien 1954a, "Prologue")

The "Old Straight Road" linking Valinor with Middle-Earth after the Second Age mirrors Asgard's bridge, Bifröst linking Midgard and Asgard. The Balrog and the collapse of the Bridge of Khazad-dûm in Moria parallel the fire jötunn Surtr and the foretold destruction of Bifröst.

=== Mirkwood ===
The name Mirkwood derives from the forest Myrkviðr of Norse mythology. 19th-century writers interested in philology, including the folklorist Jacob Grimm and the artist and fantasy writer William Morris, speculated romantically about the wild, primitive Northern forest, the Myrkviðr inn ókunni ("the pathless Mirkwood") and the secret roads across it, in the hope of reconstructing supposed ancient cultures. Grimm proposed that the name Myrkviðr derived from Old Norse mark (boundary) and mǫrk (forest), both, he supposed, from an older word for a wood, perhaps at the dangerous and disputed boundary of the kingdoms of the Huns and the Goths.

Tolkien described Mirkwood as a vast temperate broadleaf and mixed forest in the Middle-earth region of Rhovanion (Wilderland), east of the great river Anduin. In The Hobbit, the wizard Gandalf calls it "the greatest forest of the Northern world." (Note: Tolkien 1937, ch. 7 "Queer Lodgings") Before it was darkened by evil, it had been called Greenwood the Great. (Note: Tolkien 1977, "Of the Rings of Power and the Third Age")

=== Mountains ===
The medievalist Marjorie Burns writes that while Tolkien does not precisely follow the Norse model, "his mountains tend to encase the dead and include settings where treasure is found and battles occur."

Marjorie Burns's analysis of the Norseness of Middle-earth mountains
Mountain	Burial	Treasure	Fighting
Lonely Mountain	Thorin	Smaug's dragon's hoard	Battle of the Five Armies
Moria (under the Dwimorberg)	Balin	Mithril	Fellowship vs Orcs, Trolls, and the Balrog
Mount Doom	Gollum	The One Ring	Frodo and Sam vs Gollum
Barrow-downs	A prince of Arnor	Barrow-wight's hoard	Frodo vs disembodied arm; Tom Bombadil vs Barrow-wight

== Races ==
Tolkien invented parts of Middle-earth to resolve the linguistic puzzle he had accidentally created by using different European languages for those of peoples in his legendarium. (Note: Carpenter 2023, #144, to Naomi Mitchison, 25 April 1954)

=== Dwarves ===
Tolkien's Dwarves are inspired by the dwarves of Norse myths, who have an affinity with mining, metalworking, and crafting. Tolkien took the names of 12 of the 13 dwarves – excluding Balin – that he used in The Hobbit (along with the wizard Gandalf's name) from the Old Norse Völuspá in the Elder Edda. When he came to The Lord of the Rings, where he had a proper language for the Dwarves, he was obliged to pretend, in the essay Of Dwarves and Men, that the Old Norse names were translations from the Dwarves' language Khuzdul, just as the English spoken by the Dwarves to Men and Hobbits was a translation from the Common Speech, Westron. (Note: Tolkien 1996, part 2, ch. 10 "Of Dwarves and Men")

=== Elves ===
Tolkien's Elves are derived partly from Celtic mythology and partly from Norse. The division between the Calaquendi (Elves of Light) and Moriquendi (Elves of Darkness) echoes the Norse division of Dökkálfar and Ljósálfar, "light elves and dark elves". The light elves of Norse mythology are associated with the gods, much as the Calaquendi are associated with the Valar.

=== Trolls ===
In Norse mythology, trolls are a kind of giant, along with rísar, jötnar, and þursar; the names are variously applied to large monstrous beings, sometimes as synonyms. The idea that such monsters must be below ground before dawn dates back to the Elder Edda, where in the Alvíssmál, the god Thor keeps the dwarf Alviss (not a troll) talking until dawn, and sees him turn to stone.

The Hobbit's audience in 1937 were familiar with trolls from fairy tale collections such as those of Grimm, and Asbjørnsen and Moe's Norwegian Folktales; Tolkien's use of monsters of different kinds – orcs, trolls, and a balrog in Moria – made that journey "a descent into hell". Trolls thus moved from being grim Norse ogres to more sympathetic modern humanoids. Tolkien's trolls are based on the ogre type, but in two forms: ancient trolls, "creatures of dull and lumpish nature" in Tolkien's words, (Note: Tolkien 1955, Appendix F, I, "Of Other Races", "Trolls") unable to speak; and the malicious giants bred by Sauron, with strength, courage, and a measure of intelligence sufficient to make them dangerous adversaries. The scholar of English Edward Risden writes that Tolkien's later trolls appear far more dangerous than those of The Hobbit, losing, too, "the [moral] capacity to relent"; he comments that in Norse mythology, trolls are "normally female and strongly associated with magic", while in the Norse sagas the trolls were physically strong and superhuman in battle.

=== Wargs ===
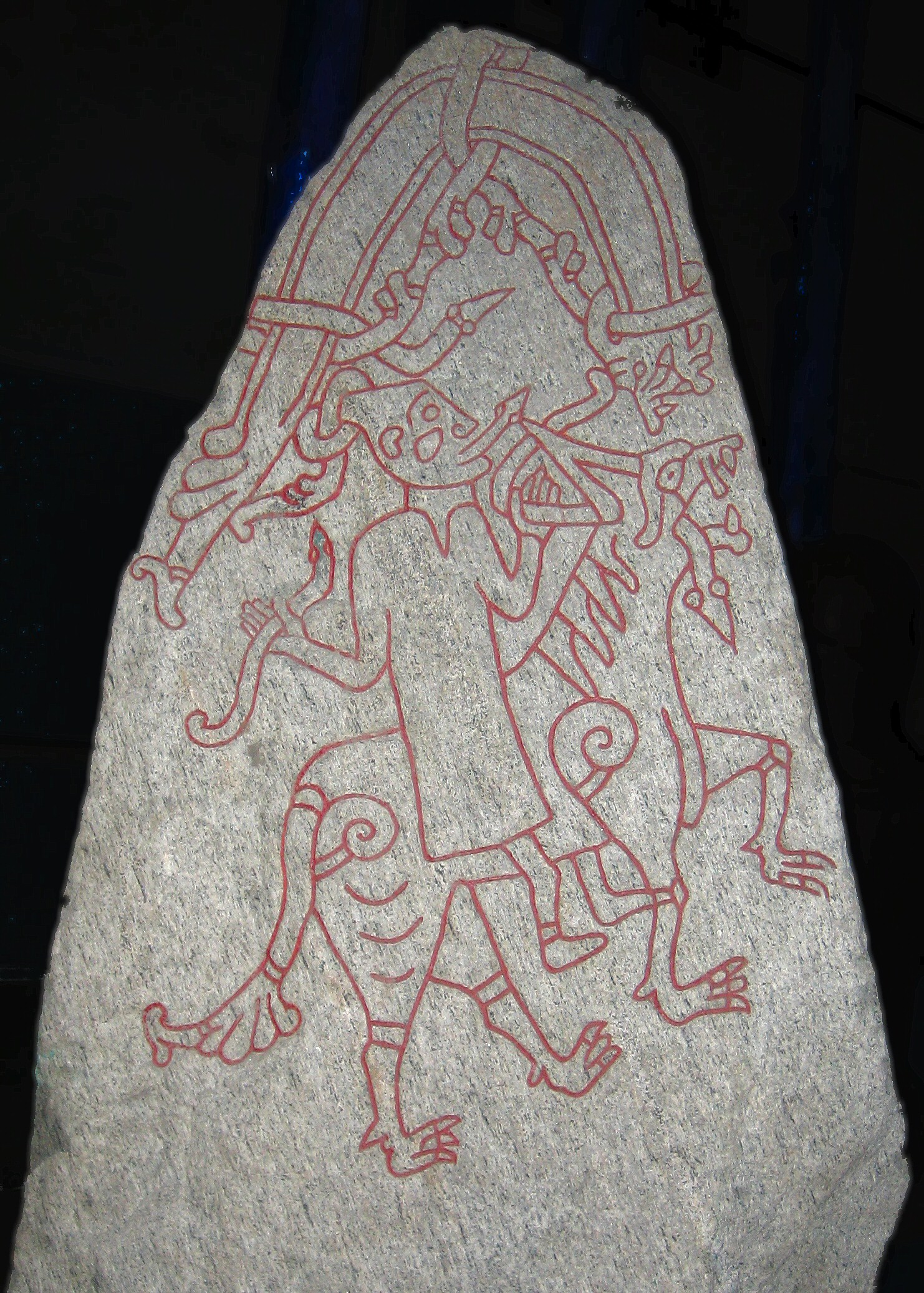
The jötunn Hyrrokin riding a wolf, on an image stone from the Hunnestad Monument, constructed in 985–1035 AD

The Tolkien scholar Tom Shippey states that Tolkien's spelling "warg" is a cross of Old Norse vargr and Old English wearh. He notes that the words embody a shift in meaning from "wolf" to "outlaw": vargr carries both meanings, while wearh means "outcast" or "outlaw", but has lost the sense of "wolf". In Old Norse, vargr is derived from the Proto-Germanic root reconstructed as *wargaz, ultimately derived from the Proto-Indo-European root reconstructed as *werg̑ʰ- "destroy". Vargr (compare modern Swedish varg "wolf") arose as a non-taboo name for úlfr, the normal Old Norse term for "wolf". He writes that

Tolkien's word 'Warg' clearly splits the difference between Old Norse and Old English pronunciations, and his concept of them – wolves, but not just wolves, intelligent and malevolent wolves – combines the two ancient opinions.

In Norse mythology, wargs are in particular the mythological wolves Fenrir, Sköll and Hati. Sköll and Hati are wolves, one going after the Sun, the other after the Moon. Wolves served as mounts for more or less dangerous humanoid creatures. For instance, Gunnr's horse was a kenning for "wolf" on the Rök runestone. In the Lay of Hyndla, the eponymous seeress rides a wolf. To Baldr's funeral, the jötunn Hyrrokkin arrived on a wolf.

== Characters ==
=== Beorn ===
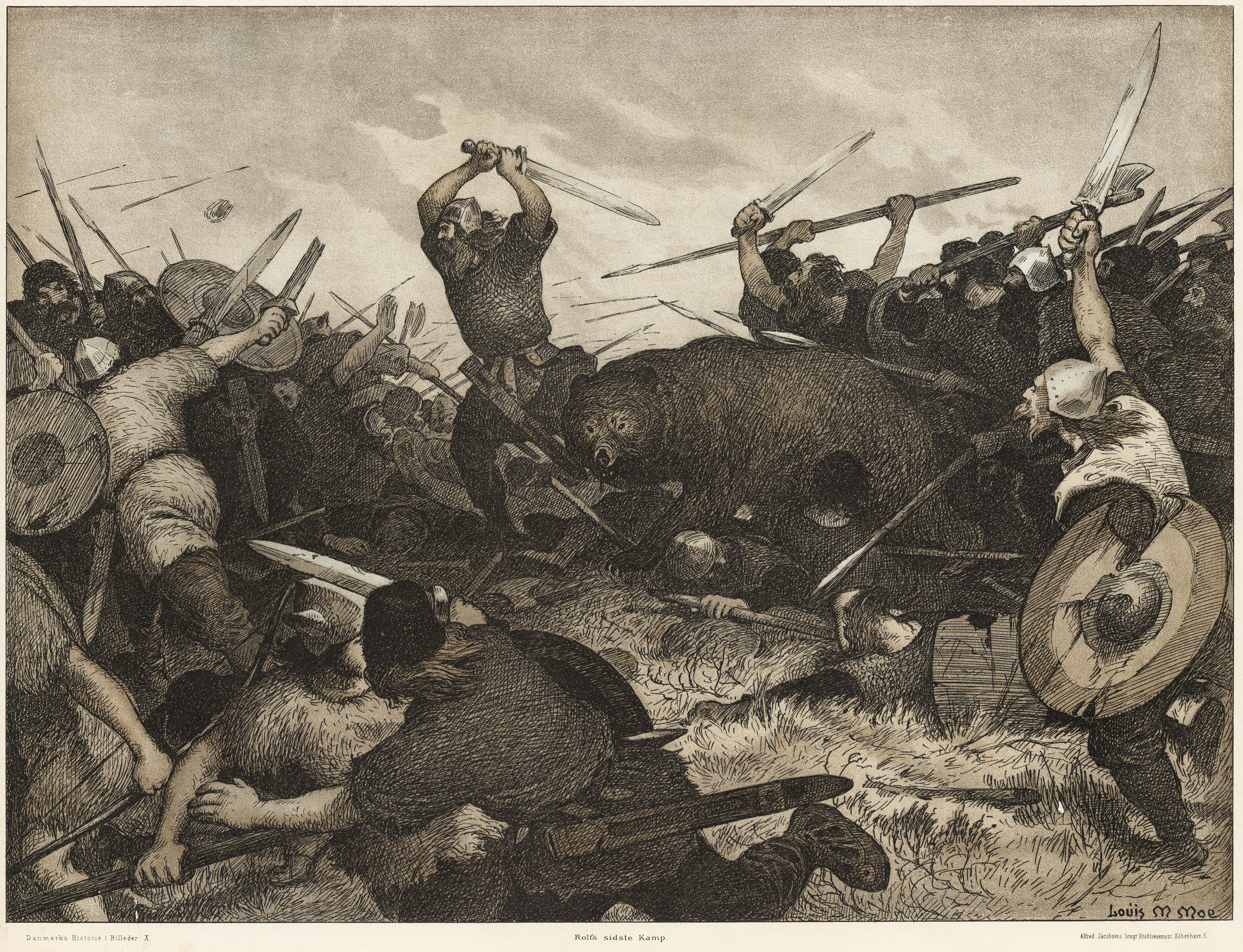
Bödvar Bjarki fights in bear form in his last battle. Lithograph by Louis Moe, 1898

Marjorie Burns in The J. R. R. Tolkien Encyclopedia describes Beorn as a berserker, a Norse warrior fighting in a trance-like fury. Beorn is a massively strong shape-shifter, half-man, half-bear, in The Hobbit derives from a combination of Norse sagas. In Hrólfs saga kraka, Bödvar Bjarki adopts the shape of a great bear when he goes to fight. In the Völsunga saga, Sigmund dresses in the skin of a wolf and gains wolfish powers. In Egil Skallagrimsson's saga, Kveldulf ("Evening-Wolf") both changes into a wolf and has half-man, half-beast children, like Beorn. Burns states that Tolkien's half-trolls and half-orcs "were no doubt influenced by the same Norse conception."

=== Barrow-wight ===
Treasures in the Norse sagas are often guarded by undead, "restless, vampire-like draugar", as in Grettis saga, recalling the barrow-wight in The Lord of the Rings. Burns comments that the vague rumours of a "blood-drinking 'ghost'" in places where the monster Gollum had been is similarly draugar-like. The guarded barrows, if successfully opened, yield fine weapons. In the Grettis saga, Grettir gets the best short sword he has ever seen; the ancient blade that Merry Brandybuck gets from the wight's barrow similarly enables him to defeat the Lord of the Nazgûl.

=== Túrin Turambar ===
Tolkien noted that the tale of his ill-fated hero Túrin Turambar (in his legendarium, now published in The Silmarillion and other works including The Children of Húrin) paralleled the Völsunga saga; an early draft was actually called Túrins Saga. Scholars have likened Túrin to both Sigurd and Sigmund; Túrin and Sigurd both become famous by killing a dragon, while both Túrin and Sigmund have incestuous relationships. (Note: Carpenter 2023, #131 to Milton Waldman, late 1951)

== Characters from Norse gods ==
=== Wizards, Dark Lords, and Odin ===
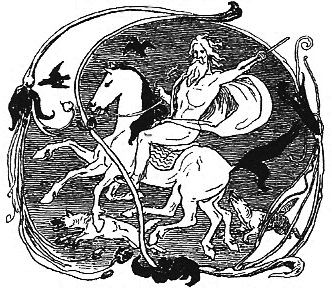
The Norse god Odin sits atop his steed Sleipnir, with his ravens Huginn and Muninn, and wolves Geri and Freki. 1895 illustration by Lorenz Frølich

Burns writes that Tolkien uses the fact that wolves were among the Norse god Odin's war beasts "in a particularly innovative way". Odin kept two wolves, Freki and Geri, their names both meaning "Greedy"; and in the final battle that destroys the world, Ragnarök, Odin is killed and eaten by the gigantic wolf Fenrir. Thus, Burns points out, wolves were both associates of Odin, and his mortal enemy. She argues that Tolkien made use of both relationships in The Lord of the Rings. In her view, the Dark Lord Sauron and the evil Wizard Saruman embody "attributes of a negative Odin". Saruman has wargs in his army, while Sauron uses "the likeness of a ravening wolf" (Note: Tolkien 1955, book 5, ch. 4, "The Siege of Gondor") for the enormous battering ram named Grond which destroys the main gate of Minas Tirith. On the other side, the benevolent Wizard Gandalf leads the fight against the wargs in The Hobbit, using his ability to create fire, and understands their language. In The Fellowship of the Ring, Gandalf again uses magic and fire to drive off a great wolf, "The Hound of Sauron", (Note: Tolkien 1954a, book 2, ch. 4, "A Journey in the Dark") and his wolf-pack; Burns writes that the wolves' attempt "to devour Gandalf hints at Odin's fate". The Dark Lord Morgoth, too, is in Burns's view Odinesque, taking on the god's negative characteristics: "his ruthlessness, his destructiveness, his malevolence, his all-pervading deceit".

In Middle-earth, Gandalf is a Wizard; the Norse name Gandálfr however was for a Dwarf. The name is composed of the words gandr ("magic staff") and álfr ("elf"), implying a powerful figure. In early drafts of The Hobbit, Tolkien used the name for the character that became Thorin Oakenshield, the head of the group of Dwarves.

=== The Valar and the Æsir ===
Tolkien's Valar, a pantheon of immortals, somewhat resemble the Æsir, the gods of Asgard. Manwë, the head of the Valar, has some similarities to Odin, the "Allfather". Thor, physically the strongest of the gods, can be seen both in Oromë, who fights the monsters of Melkor, and in Tulkas, the strongest of the Valar.

== Magical artefacts ==
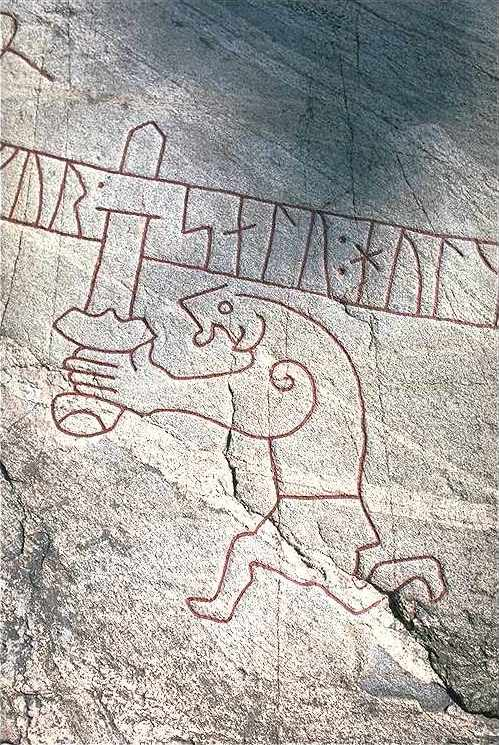
Sigurd holding the sword Gram on the Ramsund carving, c. 1030

Tolkien was influenced by Germanic heroic legend, especially its Norse and Old English forms. During his education at King Edward's School in Birmingham, he read and translated from the Old Norse in his free time. One of his first Norse purchases was the Völsunga saga. While a student, Tolkien read the only available English translation of the Völsunga saga, the 1870 rendering by William Morris of the Victorian Arts and Crafts movement and Icelandic scholar Eiríkur Magnússon.

The Old Norse Völsunga saga and the Old High German Nibelungenlied were written at around the same time, using the same ancient sources. Both of them provided some of the basis for Richard Wagner's opera series, Der Ring des Nibelungen, featuring in particular a magical but cursed golden ring and a broken sword reforged. In the Völsunga saga, these items are respectively Andvaranaut and Gram, and they correspond broadly to the One Ring and the sword Narsil (reforged as Andúril). The naming of weapons in Middle-earth, too, is a direct reflection of Norse mythology. The Völsunga saga also gives various names found in Tolkien. Tolkien's The Legend of Sigurd and Gudrún discusses the saga in relation to the myth of Sigurd and Gudrún.

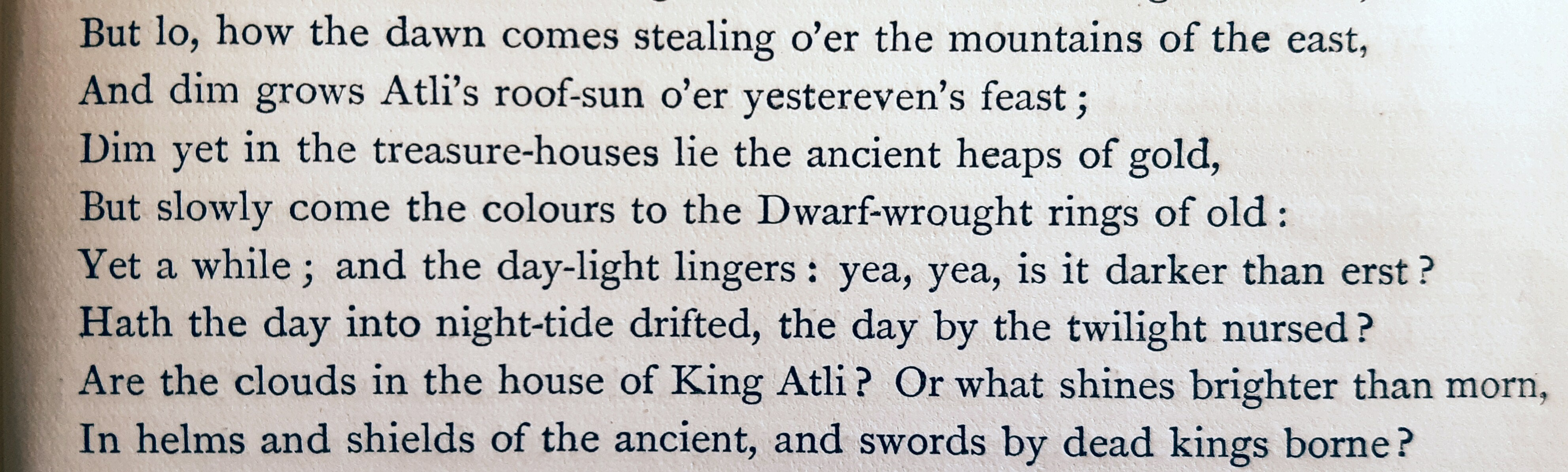
William Morris's epic poem Sigurd the Volsung told (in this extract from page 389) of Dwarf-Rings and swords carried by dead kings.

== "Northern courage" ==
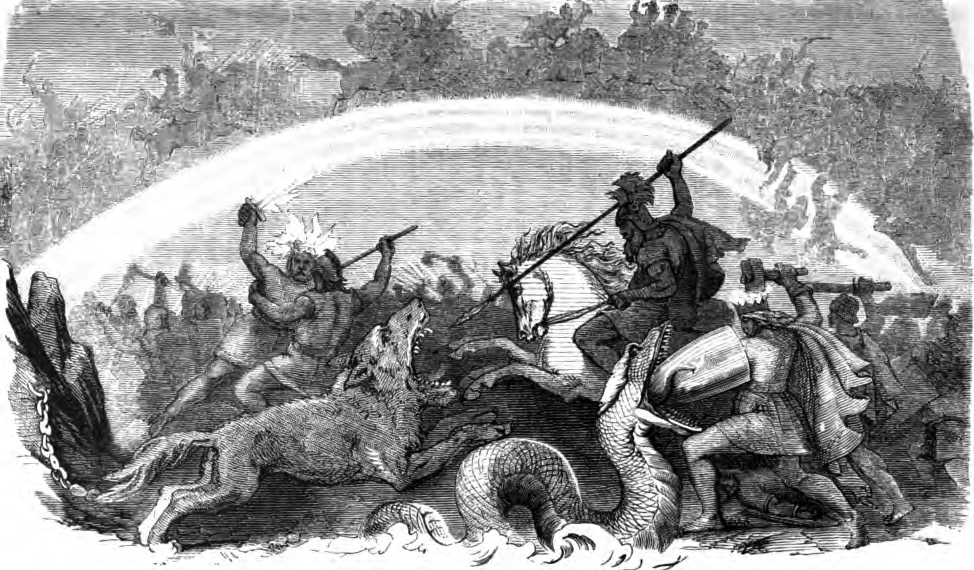
Tolkien called the quality he saw in the Norse gods at Ragnarök "Northern courage", and used it in The Lord of the Rings. Battle of the Doomed Gods by Friedrich Wilhelm Heine, 1882

For Tolkien, the quality that he called "Northern courage" was exemplified by the way the gods of Norse mythology knew they would die in the last battle, Ragnarök, but they went to fight anyway. He was influenced, too, by the Old English poems Beowulf and The Battle of Maldon, which both praise heroic courage. He hoped to construct a mythology for England, as little had survived from its pre-Christian mythology. Arguing that there had been a "fundamentally similar heroic temper" in England and Scandinavia, he fused elements from other northern European regions, both Norse and Celtic, with what he could find from England itself. Northern courage features in Tolkien's world of Middle-earth as a central virtue, closely connected to luck and fate. The protagonists of The Hobbit and The Lord of the Rings are advised by the Wizard, Gandalf, to keep up their spirits, as fate is always uncertain.

== See also ==
- Tolkien and the Celtic
- Tolkien and the classical world
- Tolkien's modern sources

== Sources ==
- Acker, Paul; Acker, Paul Leonard; Larrington, Carolyne (2002). The Poetic Edda: Essays on Old Norse Mythology. Psychology Press. ISBN 978-0-8153-1660-2.
- Attebery, Jennifer Eastman (1996). "The Trolls of Fiction: Ogres or Warm Fuzzies?". Journal of the Fantastic in the Arts. 7 (1 (25)): 61–74. JSTOR 43308256.
- Birkett, Tom (2020) [2014]. "Old Norse". In Lee, Stuart D. (ed.). A Companion to J.R.R. Tolkien. Wiley. ISBN 978-1-1196-5602-9.
- Burns, Marjorie J. (1991). "Echoes of William Morris's Icelandic Journals in J. R. R. Tolkien". Studies in Medievalism. 3 (3): 367–373.
- Burns, Marjorie (2000). "Gandalf and Odin". In Flieger, Verlyn; Hostetter, Carl F. (eds.). Tolkien's Legendarium: Essays on the History of Middle-earth. Westport, Connecticut: Greenwood Press. pp. 219–246. ISBN 978-0-313-30530-6. OCLC 41315400.
- Burns, Marjorie J. (2004). "Norse and Christian Gods: The Integrative Theology of J.R.R. Tolkien". In Chance, Jane (ed.). Tolkien and the Invention of Myth: A Reader. Lexington, Kentucky: University Press of Kentucky. pp. 163–178. ISBN 0-8131-2301-1.
- Burns, Marjorie (2005). Perilous Realms: Celtic and Norse in Tolkien's Middle-earth. University of Toronto Press. ISBN 0-8020-3806-9.
- Burns, Marjorie (2013). "Old Norse literature". In Drout, Michael D. C. (ed.). J.R.R. Tolkien Encyclopedia. Routledge. pp. 473–479. ISBN 978-0-41596-942-0.
- Burns, Marjorie (2014). "Night-wolves, Half-trolls and the Dead Who Won't Stay Down". In Houghton, John Wm.; Croft, Janet Brennan; Martsch, N. (eds.). Tolkien in the New Century: Essays in Honor of Tom Shippey. McFarland. pp. 182–196. ISBN 978-1-4766-1486-1.
- Byock, Jesse L. (1990). The Saga of the Volsungs: The Norse Epic of Sigurd the Dragon Slayer. University of California Press. ISBN 0-520-06904-8.
- Carpenter, Humphrey, ed. (2023) [1981]. The Letters of J. R. R. Tolkien: Revised and Expanded Edition. New York: HarperCollins. ISBN 978-0-35-865298-4.
- Carpenter, Humphrey (1977). J. R. R. Tolkien: A Biography. New York: Ballantine Books. ISBN 978-0-04-928037-3.
- Chance, Jane (2004). Tolkien and the Invention of Myth: A Reader. University Press of Kentucky. ISBN 0-8131-2301-1.
- Christopher, Joe R. (2012). "The Journeys To and From Purgatory Island: A Dantean Allusion at the End of C. S. Lewis's 'The Nameless Isle'". In Khoddam, Salwa; Hall, Mark R.; Fisher, Jason (eds.). C. S. Lewis and the Inklings: Discovering Hidden Truth. Cambridge Scholars Publishing. ISBN 978-1-4438-4431-4.
- Evans, Jonathan (2000). "The Dragon Lore of Middle-earth: Tolkien and Old English and Old Norse Tradition". In Clark, George; Timmons, Daniel (eds.). J. R. R. Tolkien and His Literary Resonances: Views of Middle-Earth. Greenwood Publishing Group. ISBN 0-313-30845-4.
- Evans, Jonathan (2013a) [2007]. "Mirkwood". In Drout, Michael D. C. (ed.). J. R. R. Tolkien Encyclopedia: Scholarship and Critical Assessment. Routledge. pp. 429–430. ISBN 978-0-415-96942-0.
- Evans, Jonathan (2013b) [2007]. "Dwarves". In Drout, Michael D. C. (ed.). The J. R. R. Tolkien Encyclopedia. Abingdon, England: Routledge. pp. 134–135. ISBN 978-0-415-86511-1.
- Flieger, Verlyn (2000). "J. R. R. Tolkien and the Matter of Britain". Mythlore. 23 (1 (87)): 47–58. JSTOR 26814251.
- Flieger, Verlyn (2002). Splintered Light: Logos and Language in Tolkien's World. Kent State University Press. ISBN 0-87338-744-9.
- Garth, John (2003). Tolkien and the Great War: The Threshold of Middle-earth. Houghton Mifflin Harcourt. ISBN 978-0-618-57481-0.
- Larrington, Carolyne (1999). The Poetic Edda. Oxford University Press. ISBN 978-0-19-283946-6.
- Morris, William; Magnússon, Eiríkur (1870). Völsunga Saga: The Story of the Volsungs and Niblungs, with Certain Songs from the Elder Edda. F. S. Ellis.
- Orchard, Andy (1997). Dictionary of Norse myth and legend. Cassell. ISBN 978-0-3043-4520-5.
- Parker, Douglass (1957). "Reviews: "Hwaet We Holbytla..."". The Hudson Review. 9 (4): 598–609. JSTOR 4621633.
- Rateliff, John D. (2007). The History of the Hobbit. London: HarperCollins. ISBN 978-0-00-723555-1.
- Risden, Edward L. (2015). Tolkien's Intellectual Landscape. McFarland. ISBN 978-0-7864-9865-9.
- Shippey, Tom (1982a). "Goths and Huns: the rediscovery of the Northern cultures in the nineteenth century". In Andreas Haarder (ed.). The Medieval Legacy: A Symposium. Odense University Press. pp. 51–69.
- Shippey, Tom (2004). "Light-elves, Dark-elves, and Others: Tolkien's Elvish Problem". Tolkien Studies. 1 (1): 1–15. doi:10.1353/tks.2004.0015.
- Shippey, Tom (2001). J. R. R. Tolkien: Author of the Century. HarperCollins. ISBN 978-0261-10401-3.
- Shippey, Tom (2005) [1982]. The Road to Middle-Earth: How J. R. R. Tolkien Created a New Mythology (Third ed.). HarperCollins. ISBN 978-0-261-10275-0.
- Shippey, Tom (2007). Roots and Branches: Selected Papers on Tolkien. Cormarë Series. Vol. 11. Walking Tree Publishers. ISBN 978-3-905703-05-4.
- Simek, Rudolf (2005). "Trolle (trolls)". Mittelerde: Tolkien und die germanische Mythologie [Middle-earth: Tolkien and Germanic Mythology]. Beck'sche Reihe (in German) (First ed.). C. H. Beck. pp. 125–128. ISBN 978-3-406-52837-8. JSTOR j.ctv19cwbqw.
- Simek, Rudolf (2007). Dictionary of Northern Mythology. Translated by Angela Hall. D.S. Brewer. ISBN 978-0-85991-513-7.
- St. Clair, Gloriana (1996). "An Overview Of the Northern Influences on Tolkien's Works". Mythlore. 21 (2). Article 13.
- St. Clair, Gloriana (1996b). "Volsunga Saga and Narn: Some Analogies". Mythlore. 21 (2). Article 14.
- Tolkien, J. R. R. (1937). Douglas A. Anderson (ed.). The Annotated Hobbit. Boston: Houghton Mifflin (published 2002). ISBN 978-0-618-13470-0.
- Tolkien, J. R. R. (1954a). The Fellowship of the Ring. The Lord of the Rings. Boston: Houghton Mifflin. OCLC 9552942.
- Tolkien, J. R. R. (1955). The Return of the King. The Lord of the Rings. Boston: Houghton Mifflin. OCLC 519647821.
- Tolkien, J. R. R. (1977). Christopher Tolkien (ed.). The Silmarillion. Boston: Houghton Mifflin. ISBN 978-0-395-25730-2.
- Tolkien, J. R. R. (1996). Christopher Tolkien (ed.). The Peoples of Middle-earth. Boston: Houghton Mifflin. ISBN 978-0-395-82760-4.
- Tolkien, J. R. R. (1997) [1983]. The Monsters and the Critics, and Other Essays. HarperCollins. ISBN 978-0-261-10263-7.
- Welch, Lynda C. (2001). Goddess of the North: A Comprehensive Exploration of the Norse Goddesses, from Antiquity to the Modern Age. Weiser Books. ISBN 978-1-60925-312-7.
- Wilkin, Peter (2006). "Norse Influences on Tolkien's Elves and Dwarves". Sydney Studies in Religion: 61–80. ISSN 1444-5158.
- Zoëga, Geir T. (1910). "vargr". A Concise Dictionary of Old Icelandic. Clarendon Press.
