= Scotsburn =

Scotsburn may refer to:

- Scotsburn, Highland, Scotland
- Scotsburn, Nova Scotia, Canada
- Scotsburn, Victoria, Australia

== See also ==
- Scott Burns (disambiguation)
