= England in Middle-earth =

Theme in Tolkien's writing

England and Englishness are represented in multiple forms within J. R. R. Tolkien's Middle-earth writings; it appears, more or less thinly disguised, in the form of the Shire and the lands close to it; in kindly characters such as Treebeard, Faramir, and Théoden; in its industrialised state as Isengard and Mordor; and as Anglo-Saxon England in Rohan. Lastly, and most pervasively, Englishness appears in the words and behaviour of the hobbits, both in The Hobbit and in The Lord of the Rings.

Tolkien has often been supposed to have spoken of wishing to create "a mythology for England"; though it seems he never used the actual phrase, various commentators have found it appropriate as a description of much of his approach in creating Middle-earth, and the legendarium that lies behind The Silmarillion. His desire to create a national mythology echoed similar attempts in countries across Europe, especially Elias Lönnrot's creation of the Kalevala in Finland.

== England ==
=== An English Shire ===
England and Englishness appear in Middle-earth, more or less thinly disguised, in the form of the Shire and the lands close to it, including Bree and Tom Bombadil's domain of the Old Forest and the Barrow-downs. In England, a shire is a rural administrative region, a county. Brian Rosebury likens the Shire to Tolkien's childhood home on the border of Worcestershire and Warwickshire in England's West Midlands in the 1890s:

Sarehole, with its nearby farms, its mill by the riverside, its willow-trees, its pool with swans, its dell with blackberries, was a serene quasi-rural enclave, an obvious model-to-be for ... Hobbiton and the Shire.

The Shire is described by Tom Shippey as a calque upon England, a systematic construction mapping the origin of the people, its three original tribes, its two legendary founders, its organisation, its surnames, and its placenames. Others have noted easily perceived aspects such as the homely names of public houses like The Green Dragon. Tolkien stated that he grew up "in 'the Shire' in a pre-mechanical age".

Tom Shippey's analysis of Tolkien's calque of the Shire upon England
Element	The Shire	England
Origin of people	The Angle between the Rivers Hoarwell (Mitheithel) and the Loudwater (Bruinen) from the East (across Eriador)	The Angle between Flensburg Fjord and the Schlei, from the East (across the North Sea), hence the name "England"
Original three tribes	Stoors, Harfoots, Fallohides	Angles, Saxons, Jutes (Note: Shippey comments that both nations have forgotten their origins.)
Legendary founders named "horse" (Note: Old English: hengest, stallion; hors, horse; *marh, horse, cf "mare"; blanca, white horse in Beowulf)	Marcho and Blanco	Hengest and Horsa
Length of civil peace	272 years from Battle of Greenfields to Battle of Bywater	270 years from Battle of Sedgemoor to publication of Lord of the Rings
Organisation	Mayors, moots, Shirriffs (Note: Sheriff, Shirriff is derived from Old English scir-gerefa "Shire-reeve", an officer of the shire.)	like "an old-fashioned and idealised England"
Surnames	e.g. Banks, Boffin, Bolger, Bracegirdle, Brandybuck, Brockhouse, Chubb, Cotton, Fairbairns, Grubb, Hayward, Hornblower, Noakes, Proudfoot, Took, Underhill, Whitfoot	All are real English surnames. Tolkien comments e.g. that "Bracegirdle" is "used in the text, of course, with reference to the hobbit tendency to be fat and so to strain their belts".
Placenames	e.g. "Nobottle" e.g. "Buckland"	Nobottle, Northamptonshire; Buckland, Oxfordshire

=== The vanishing "Little Kingdom" ===
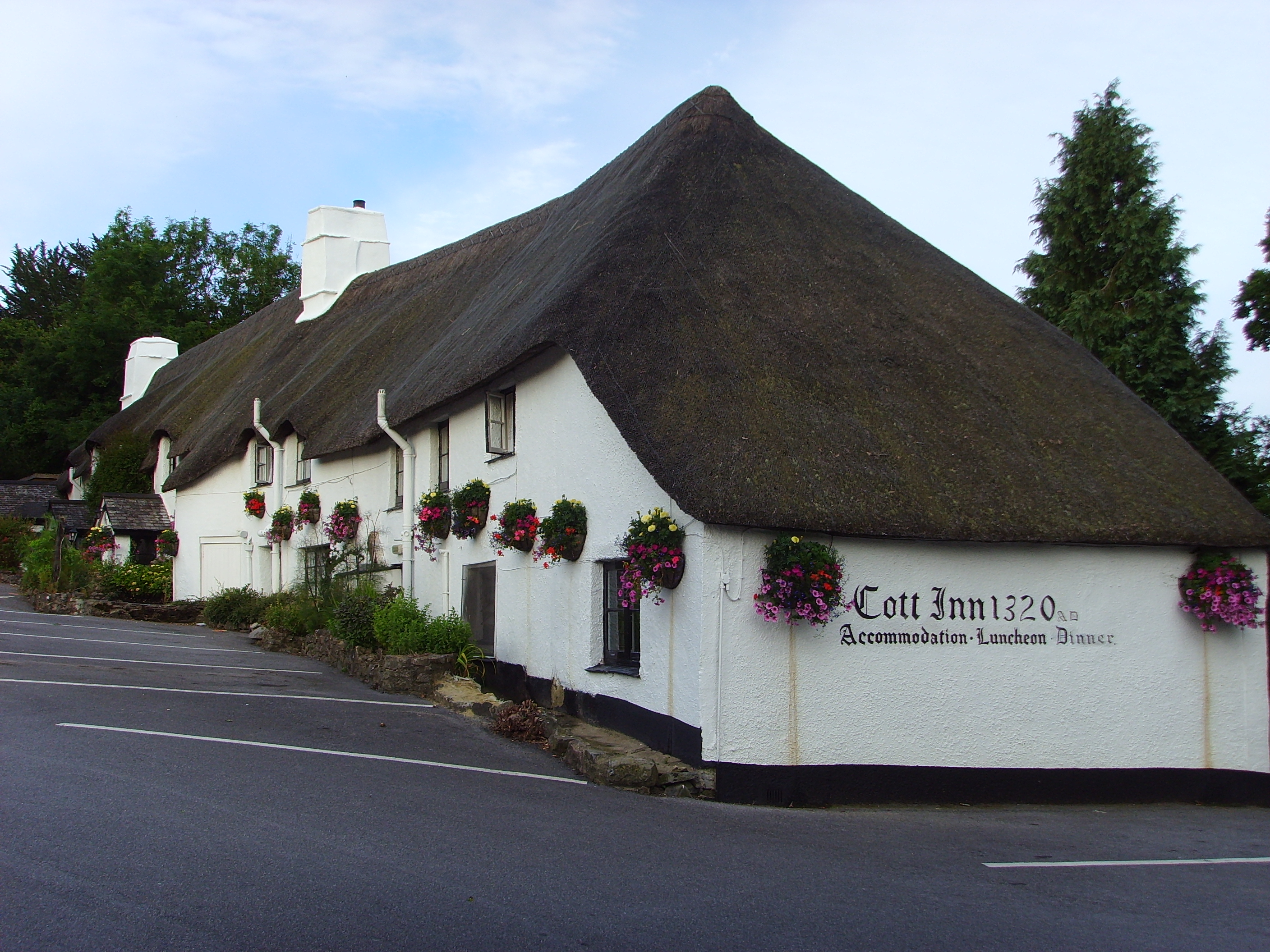
Both the Shire and Bree have comfortable English-style public houses that serve beer. The medieval Cott Inn, Devon, is pictured.

Bree and Bombadil are still, in Shippey's words, in "The Little Kingdom", if not quite in the Shire. Bree is similar to the Shire, with its hobbit residents and the welcoming Prancing Pony inn. Bombadil represents the spirit of place of the Oxfordshire and Berkshire countryside, which Tolkien felt was vanishing. (Note: Carpenter 2023, #19 to Stanley Unwin, 16 December 1937)

Shippey analyses how Tolkien's careful account in The Lord of the Rings of the land in the angle between two rivers, the Hoarwell and the Loudwater, matches the Angle between the Flensburg Fjord and the River Schlei, the legendary origin of the Angles, one of the three tribes who founded England.

Lothlórien, too, carries overtones of a perfect, timeless England; Shippey notes how the hobbits feel they have stepped "over a bridge in time" as they cross yet another pair of rivers to enter Lothlórien.

Tom Shippey's analysis of Tolkien's river angles
Rivers	Place	Peoples	Time
Flensburg Fjord, Schlei	Germany	The forefathers of the English	Long ago, before England was founded
Hoarwell, Loudwater	Eriador	The forefathers of the Hobbits	Long ago, before the Shire was founded
Nimrodel, Silverlode	Lothlórien	The Elves, as they used to be	Long ago, in "the Elder Days ... in a world that was no more"

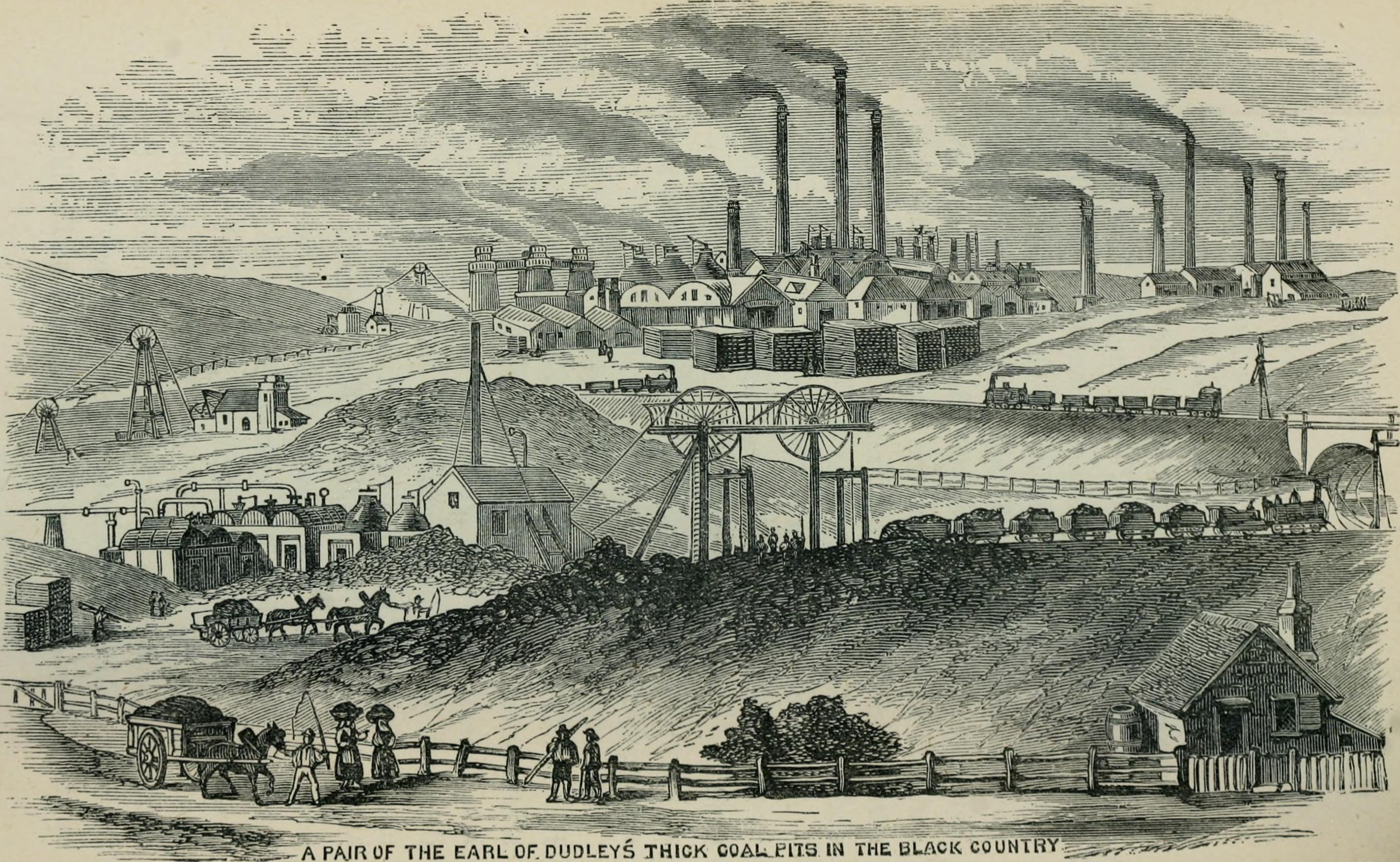
Mines, ironworks, smoke, and spoil heaps: the Black Country, near Tolkien's childhood home, has been suggested as an influence on his vision of Mordor.

=== Industrialised England ===
England appears in its industrialised state as Isengard and Mordor. In particular, it has been suggested that the industrialized area called "the Black Country" near J. R. R. Tolkien's childhood home inspired his vision of Mordor; the name "Mordor" meant "Black Land" in Tolkien's invented language of Sindarin, and "Land of Shadow" in Quenya. (Note: Carpenter 2023, #297 to Mr. Rang, draft, August 1967) Shippey further links the fallen wizard Saruman and his industrial Isengard to "Tolkien's own childhood image of industrial ugliness ... Sarehole Mill, with its literally bone-grinding owner".

=== Anglo-Saxon England ===
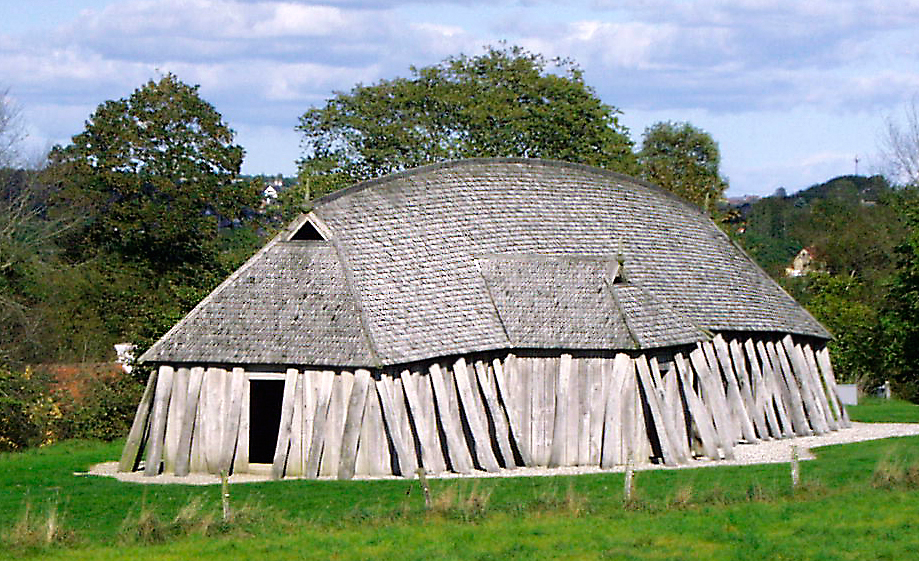
A reconstructed Viking Age longhouse similar to Beowulf's Heorot

Anglo-Saxon England appears, modified by the people's extensive use of horses in battle, in the land of Rohan. The names of the Rohirrim, the Riders of Rohan, are straightforwardly Old English, as are the terms they use and their placenames: Théoden means "king" in Old English; Éored means "troop of cavalry" and Éomer is "horse-famous", both related to Éoh, "horse"; Eorlingas means "sons of Eorl"; the name of his throne-hall is Meduseld, which means "mead-hall". The chapter "The King of the Golden Hall" is constructed to match the passage in the Old English poem Beowulf where the hero approaches the court of Heorot and is challenged by different guards along the way, and many of the names used come directly from there. (Note: Tolkien 1954, book 3 ch. 6 "The King of the Golden Hall") The name of the Riders' land, the Mark, is Tolkien's reconstruction of the Germanic word from which the Latinised name "Mercia", applied to the central kingdom of Anglo-Saxon England and the region where Tolkien grew up, derives.

== Englishness ==
=== Hobbits ===
Englishness appears in the words and behaviour of the hobbits, throughout both The Hobbit and The Lord of the Rings. Shippey writes that from the first page of The Hobbit, "the Bagginses at least were English by temperament and turn of phrase". Burns states that

it too lies within the English, in the best of English-kind. It lies in the courage and tenacity Tolkien admired in his fellow countrymen during the First World War; it lies in the English ability to recognize duty and carry resolutely through...

It is the same with the hobbits, who return and rebuild the Shire. Though it is their complacent and comfort-seeking qualities that stand out most consistently, a warrior's courage or an Elf's sensitivity can arise in hobbits as well.

Burns writes that Bilbo Baggins, the eponymous hero of The Hobbit, has acquired or rediscovered "an Englishman's northern roots. He has gained an Anglo-Saxon self-reliance and a Norseman's sense of will, and all of this is kept from excess by a Celtic sensitivity, by a love of earth, of poetry, and of simple song and cheer." She finds a similar balance in the hobbits of The Lord of the Rings, Pippin, Merry, and Sam. Frodo's balance, though, has been destroyed by a quest beyond his strength; he still embodies some of the elements of Englishness, but lacking the simple cheerfulness of the other hobbits because of his other character traits, his Celtic sorrow and Nordic doom.

=== 'English' characters ===
Kindly characters such as Treebeard, Faramir, and Théoden exemplify Englishness with their actions and mannerisms. Treebeard's distinctive booming bass voice with his "hrum, hroom" mannerism is indeed said by Tolkien's biographer, Humphrey Carpenter, to be based directly on that of Tolkien's close friend, fellow Oxford University professor and Inkling, C. S. Lewis. Marjorie Burns sees "a Robin Hood touch" in the green-clad Faramir and his men hunting the enemy in Ithilien, while in Fangorn forest, she feels that Treebeard's speech "has a comfortable English ring". Théoden's name is a direct transliteration of Old English þēoden, meaning "king, prince"; he welcomes Merry, a Hobbit from the Shire, with warmth and friendship. Garry O'Connor adds that there is a striking resemblance between the wizard Gandalf, the English actor Ian McKellen who plays Gandalf in Peter Jackson's Middle-earth films, and, based on Humphrey Carpenter's biographical account, of another Englishman, Tolkien himself:

He has a strange voice, deep but without resonance, entirely English but with some quality in it that I cannot define, as if he had come from another age or civilization. Yet for much of the time he does not speak clearly. Words come out in eager rushes ... He speaks in complex sentences ...

=== Shakespearean plot elements ===
Shippey suggests that Tolkien cautiously respected the English playwright William Shakespeare, and that he appears to have felt some kind of fellow-feeling with him, given that they were both from the county of Warwickshire in the English midlands, where Tolkien had passed his happiest childhood years. Some of the plot elements in The Lord of the Rings resemble Shakespeare's, notably in Macbeth. Tolkien's use of walking trees, the Huorns, to destroy the Orc-horde at the Battle of Helm's Deep carries a definite echo of the coming of Birnam Wood to Dunsinane Hill, though Tolkien admits the mythic nature of the event where Shakespeare denies it. Glorfindel's prophecy that the Lord of the Nazgûl would not die at the hand of any man directly reflects the Macbeth prophecy; commentators have found Tolkien's solution – he is killed by a woman and a hobbit in the Battle of the Pelennor Fields – more satisfying than Shakespeare's (a man brought into the world by Caesarean section, so not exactly "born").

Tom Shippey's analysis of Shakespearean prophecy in The Lord of the Rings and Macbeth
Plot element	Work	Prophecy	Events	Explanation
A forest seems to move	The Lord of the Rings	(unexpected)	Walking trees (Huorns) destroy Orc-horde at Battle of Helm's Deep	Mythic
A forest seems to move	Macbeth	Birnam Wood shall come to Dunsinane Hill	Macduff's men cut branches, carry them to Dunsinane	Ordinary
A villain seems to be protected	The Lord of the Rings	Not by the hand of Man will he fall	A woman, Éowyn, and a Hobbit, Merry, kill the Lord of the Nazgûl; Merry's sword was made exactly for this purpose (Note: Tolkien 1955, book 5, ch. 6 "The Battle of the Pelennor Fields": "No other blade, not though mightier hands had wielded it, would have dealt that foe a wound so bitter, cleaving the undead flesh, breaking the spell that knit his unseen sinews to his will.")	Mythic
A villain seems to be protected	Macbeth	None of woman born shall harm Macbeth	Macduff, delivered by Caesarean section so not strictly "born", kills Macbeth	Ordinary

== A mythology for England ==
Tolkien has often been supposed to have spoken of wishing to create "a mythology for England". It seems he never used the actual phrase, but commentators have found his biographer Humphrey Carpenter's phrase appropriate as a description of much of his approach in creating Middle-earth, and the legendarium that lies behind The Silmarillion. Tolkien's desire to create a national mythology (Note: Carpenter 2023, #131 to Milton Waldman (at Collins), late 1951) echoed similar attempts in countries across Europe, especially Elias Lönnrot's creation of the Kalevala in Finland, which Tolkien read and admired. Other attempts had been made in Denmark, Finland, Germany, Scotland, and Wales in the 18th and 19th centuries. The mythology was initially intended as a home for his invented languages such as those that became Quenya and Sindarin, but he discovered as he worked on it that he wanted to make a properly English epic, spanning England's geography, language, and mythology.

Tolkien recognised that any actual English mythology, which he presumed, by analogy with Norse mythology and the clues that remain, to have existed until Anglo-Saxon times, had been extinguished. Tolkien decided to reconstruct such a mythology, accompanied to some extent by an imagined prehistory or pseudohistory of the Angles, Saxons, and Jutes before they migrated to England. Tolkien therefore looked to Norse and other mythologies for guidance. He found hints in Beowulf and other Old English sources. These gave him his ettens (as in the Ettenmoors) and ents, his elves, and his orcs; his "warg" is a cross between Old Norse vargr and Old English wearh. He took his woses or wood-woses (the Drúedain) from the seeming plural wodwos in the Middle English Sir Gawain and the Green Knight, line 721; that comes in turn from Old English wudu-wasa, a singular noun. Shippey comments that

As for creating a "Mythology for England", one certain fact is that the Old English notions of Elves, Orcs, Ents, Ettens and Woses have through Tolkien been re-released into the popular imagination to join the much more familiar Dwarves ..., Trolls, ... and the wholly-invented Hobbits."

Verlyn Flieger comments that

If Tolkien's legendarium as we have it now is a mythology for England, it is a song about great power and promise in the throes of decline, racked by dissensions, split by factions, perpetually threatened by war, and perpetually at war with itself. It seems closer to Orwell's 1984 than to the furry-footed escapist fantasy that detractors of The Lord of the Rings characterize that work as being."

== Sources ==
- Baratta, Chris (15 November 2011). Environmentalism in the Realm of Science Fiction and Fantasy Literature. Cambridge Scholars Publishing. ISBN 978-1-4438-3542-8.
- Bosworth, Joseph; Toller, T. Northcote (1898). An Anglo-Saxon Dictionary. Prague: Charles University.
- Burns, Marjorie (2005). Perilous Realms: Celtic and Norse in Tolkien's Middle-earth. University of Toronto Press. ISBN 978-0-8020-3806-7.
- Butler, Catherine (2013). "Tolkien and Worldbuilding". In Hunt, Peter (ed.). J. R. R. Tolkien: The Hobbit and The Lord of the Rings. Palgrave Macmillan. pp. 106–120. ISBN 978-1-137-26399-5.
- Carpenter, Humphrey (1977). J. R. R. Tolkien: A Biography. New York: Ballantine Books. ISBN 978-0-04-928037-3.
- Carpenter, Humphrey, ed. (2023) [1981]. The Letters of J. R. R. Tolkien: Revised and Expanded Edition. New York: HarperCollins. ISBN 978-0-35-865298-4.
- Chance, Jane (1980) [1979]. Tolkien's Art: 'A Mythology for England'. Macmillan. ISBN 978-0-333-29034-7.
- Drout, Michael D. C. (2004). "A Mythology for Anglo-Saxon England". In Chance, Jane (ed.). Tolkien and the Invention of Myth: a Reader. University Press of Kentucky. pp. 229–247. ISBN 978-0-8131-2301-1.
- Duriez, Colin (1992). The J.R.R. Tolkien Handbook: A Comprehensive Guide to His Life, Writings, and World of Middle-earth. Baker Book House. ISBN 978-0-8010-3014-7.
- Fimi, Dimitra (2010) [2008]. Tolkien, Race, and Cultural History: From Fairies to Hobbits. Palgrave Macmillan. ISBN 978-0-230-21951-9. OCLC 222251097.
- Flieger, Verlyn (2005). "7. An Unfinished Symphony". Interrupted Music: The Making Of Tolkien's Mythology. Kent State University Press. pp. 139–142. ISBN 978-0-87338-824-5.
- Hostetter, Carl F.; Smith, Arden R. (1996). "A Mythology for England". Mythlore. 21 (2). Article 42.
- Kuusela, Tommy (May 2014). "In Search of a National Epic: The use of Old Norse myths in Tolkien's vision of Middle-earth". Approaching Religion. 4 (1): 25–36. doi:10.30664/ar.67534.
- Solopova, Elizabeth (2009). Languages, Myths and History: An Introduction to the Linguistic and Literary Background of J. R. R. Tolkien's Fiction. New York City: North Landing Books. ISBN 978-0-9816607-1-4.
- O'Connor, Garry (2019). Ian McKellen: a biography. St. Martin's Press. ISBN 978-1-250-22388-3. OCLC 1113218800.
- Rateliff, John D. (2009). "'A Kind of Elvish Craft': Tolkien as Literary Craftsman". Tolkien Studies. 6. West Virginia University Press: 11ff. doi:10.1353/tks.0.0048. S2CID 170947885.
- Rosebury, Brian (2003). Tolkien: A Cultural Phenomenon. Palgrave. ISBN 978-1-4039-1263-3.
- Shippey, Tom (2001). J. R. R. Tolkien: Author of the Century. HarperCollins. ISBN 978-0-261-10401-3.
- Shippey, Tom (2005) [1982]. The Road to Middle-Earth: How J. R. R. Tolkien Created a New Mythology (Third ed.). HarperCollins. ISBN 978-0-261-10275-0.
- Tolkien, J. R. R. (1954). The Two Towers. The Lord of the Rings. Boston: Houghton Mifflin. OCLC 1042159111.
- Tolkien, J. R. R. (1955). The Return of the King. The Lord of the Rings. Boston: Houghton Mifflin. OCLC 519647821.
- Tolkien, J. R. R. (1967). "Guide to the Names in The Lord of the Rings". Academia.edu. Also published in A Tolkien Compass (1975) and The Lord of the Rings: A Reader's Companion (2005).
- Tyler, J. E. A. (1976). The Tolkien Companion. Macmillan. ISBN 978-0-333-19633-5.
- Wynne, Patrick H. (2006). "Theoden". In Drout, Michael D. C. (ed.). The J. R. R. Tolkien Encyclopedia (first ed.). Routledge. p. 643. ISBN 978-0-415-96942-0.
