= Ernesto Gonzalez (politician) =

American politician (born 1956)

Member of New Hampshire House of Representatives for Merrimack County's 3rd district
- Incumbent
- Assumed office December 4, 2024
- Succeeded by: Scott Burns (elect)

Personal details
- Born: July 1, 1956 (age 70) Havana, Cuba
- Party: Republican
- Website: www.ernestogonzalezfornh.com

Ernesto Leonardo Gonzalez (born July 1, 1956 in Havana) is an American politician. He is a member of the New Hampshire House of Representatives.
