= Scott Burns (politician) =

American politician

Member-elect of the New Hampshire House of Representatives from the Merrimack 3rd district
- Assuming office December 2026
- Succeeding: Ernesto Gonzalez

Member of the New Hampshire House of Representatives from the Merrimack 2nd district
- In office 2012–2014

Personal details
- Party: Democratic

Scott Burns is an American politician. A member of the Democratic Party, he is the member-elect for the Merrimack 3rd district of the New Hampshire House of Representatives. He previously served in the House from 2012 to 2014.
