= Perilous Realms =

2005 Marjorie Burns book

- Cover of first edition
- Author: Marjorie Burns
- Language: English
- Subject: Tolkien studies
- Genre: Scholarly analysis
- Publisher: University of Toronto Press
- Publication date: 2005
- Media type: Paperback
- Pages: 225
- ISBN: 978-0-8020-3806-7
- OCLC: 254993213

Perilous Realms: Celtic and Norse in Tolkien's Middle-earth is a 2005 scholarly book about the origins of J. R. R. Tolkien's Middle-earth, and the nature of his characterisation, by the scholar of literature Marjorie Burns. Some of the chapters discuss "Celtic" and "Norse" influence on Tolkien's writing, while others explore literary themes. The book won a Mythopoeic Award for Inklings' Studies in 2008.

Reviewers have praised the book for helping to balance out earlier work on Middle-earth's Norse origins, for the way it shows the importance of "Celtic"-style crossings of rivers or gateways into Elvish and other realms, and for showing the fantasy author and Arts and Crafts advocate William Morris's influence on The Hobbit. Scholars have been less sure about the book's use of the shifting terms "Celtic" and "Norse", which are no longer used as they were in Tolkien's time.

== Publication history ==
Perilous Realms was published in paperback by the University of Toronto Press in 2005. They brought out a second edition in 2015.

== Synopsis ==
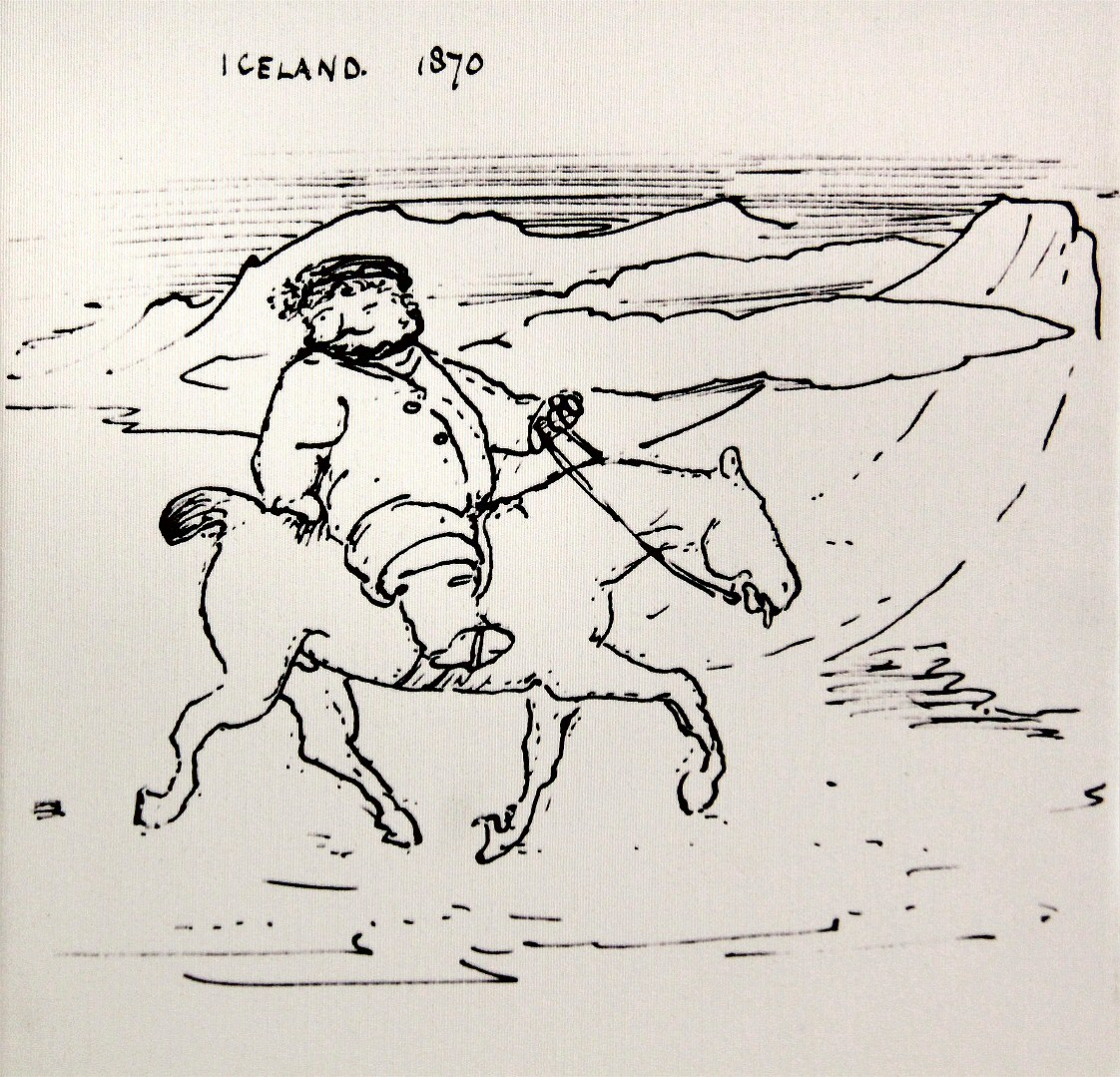
Burns argues that Bilbo's character and adventures match many details of William Morris's expedition in Iceland. Cartoon of Morris riding a pony by his travelling companion Edward Burne-Jones (1870)

Marjorie Burns introduces the book with a chapter on "Two Norths", meaning the "Celtic" and the "Norse", noting the history of the idealised "North" with the Romantic movement. She looks at the skin-changer Beorn, one of several loner characters "on the side of good but who carry an aura of risk", tracing him to Sir Gawain and the Green Knight as well as to Beowulf. She comments that Tolkien is often more subtle than people think, offering "contrasting viewpoints" rather than a simple good-versus-evil story. The chapter on "Bridges, Gates, and Doors" examines the "Celtic" otherworld's influence, with crossings of rivers or other gateways (such as into the Barrow-wight's ancient abode) marking the descent into strange and Elvish realms. Burns then explores the influence of William Morris on Tolkien, proposing that his Icelandic Journals may have suggested the character of Bilbo Baggins.

Returning to the theme of more complex characters with both good and bad sides, Burns notes in passing the pairing of Frodo with Gollum, or Théoden with Denethor. She suggests that Gandalf is an Odinic figure, taking on some of the attributes of that undependable Norse god, such as wandering in disguise as "an old man in a battered hat", while Galadriel borrows from "an impressive collection of influential [Celtic] figures" including the mother goddess Dana; the fertility goddess Rhiannon; and the battlefield goddesses like the Morrígan. She discusses, too, Galadriel's enchantress role, and compares her to the powerful Melian in The Silmarillion. Burns then looks at the apparently few women in Middle-earth; Burns notes that women may seem distant, but that both Elves and Hobbits "exhibit traits that are typically thought feminine", whether at "ethereal" or "earthly" levels, and his "most admirable males" have a softer side, whereas the "least desirable species" like Trolls and Orcs are "brutally male (and excessively Norse as well)".

Burns discusses food as an aspect of character, writing that the Elves have a delicate vegetarian diet whereas Orc food is quite the opposite. Further, The Hobbit indicates Bilbo's fear of being eaten, and with his home Bag End's multiple kitchens, dining rooms, and pantries, his fear of not having enough to eat. She writes that he faces the risk of becoming a meal for, in turn "trolls, goblins, and Gollum; wolves, spiders, and Smaug, each of them mightily hungry". She looks, too, at the consuming emptiness of the monstrous figures in The Lord of the Rings, naming "Lobelia [Sackville-Baggins], Gollum, Wormtongue, Saruman, Denethor", Shelob, and the Dark Lord Sauron's "lonely, raging emptiness".

== Awards ==
The book won a Mythopoeic Award in Inklings Studies in 2008.

== Reception ==
C. W. Sullivan III, reviewing Perilous Realms for the Journal of Folklore Research, found it both praiseworthy and problematic. He liked Burns's discussion of the English prejudice against the Celts, and of Tolkien's dislike of frivolous post-Shakespeare fairies. He noted that many of the chapters were published as separate papers, so there was some repetition. He commented that she had failed to note the Celtic origin of Sir Gawain: the Irish Bricriu's Feast describes a beheading challenge much like that of Sir Gawain. He wondered, too, why the chapter on eating and devouring barely mentioned Celtic or Norse, when there were "certainly important scenes of feasting and devouring, selfishness and selflessness" in those traditions' stories. "But she had written a "valuable window into Tolkien's sources" and the way he blended "Celtic enchantment and Norse vitality", and the book was accessible to scholars and the public alike.

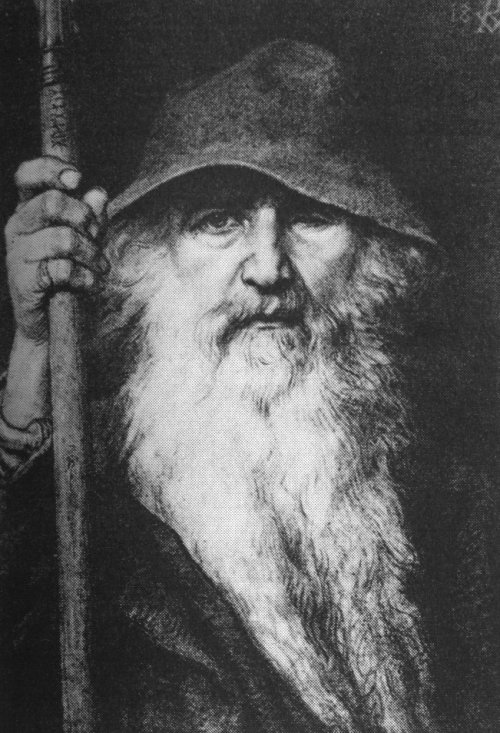
Gandalf-like: Odin, the Wanderer by Georg von Rosen, 1886

Kathryn Stelmach, reviewing the book for Comitatus, found Burns's exploration of Norse "more compelling" than her "overly simplified" approach to the "Celtic" identity and the use of unreliable sources. Stelmach writes that both "Celtic" and "Norse" have a "complicated and shifting nexus ... of identity", and that Burns's introductory chapter gives the reader an impression of the two identities based more on language than on culture. Stelmach is happier with the "Norse" discussion, such as of Gandalf's Norse counterpart, Odin, as it is based on Tom Shippey's "solid grounding", while the analysis of the influence of the Icelandic Journals of William Morris on The Hobbit offers "rare insights".

The folklorist Dimitra Fimi, in Tolkien Studies, writes that the book is mainly a collection of revised papers, with two new chapters, and that the focus is on Tolkien's created characters rather than the source analysis that its title might suggest. She finds Burns's introductory account of history "sometimes simplified" but a useful overview of the contested terms "Celtic" and "Teutonic" at Tolkien's time. She finds convincing Burns's argument that the "water barriers, the timelessness and the underground connotations of many Elvish realms in Middle-earth, such as Rivendell, Mirkwood and Lothlórien, come from ideas of the Celtic otherworld." She praises, too, the linking of William Morris to The Hobbit, writing that this "gave it much of its 'Northern' atmosphere." The two additional chapters, on male/female balance and on food, she finds somewhat out of place in the book, not least because they don't mention "Celtic or Norse sources or parallels". In sum, Fimi finds the book "thought-provoking and well researched", adding a "Celtic" balance to the mainly Norse emphasis of earlier scholars. She praises the analysis of Tolkien's characters and the book's freedom from "'defending' Tolkien". Fimi suggests that Burns had intended the book for the public rather than scholars as she uses "accessible language" and avoids the scholarly debate over "Celticity", preferring to use the terms of Tolkien's time.

Faye Ringel, reviewing the book in Journal of the Fantastic in the Arts, calls it "a valuable, beautifully crafted addition to the study of Tolkien's sources and influences", with the proviso that people suspicious of any appearance of ideology in high fantasy may not agree with her discussion of gender and race. She comments that Burns responds indirectly to such critics by providing evidence in favour of Tolkien's approach, such as by presenting his own "complexity through double attitudes". She suggests that the book may serve as a "counterweight" to the popular and "nonce" books that appeared alongside Peter Jackson's films.

== Sources ==
- Burns, Marjorie (2005). Perilous Realms: Celtic and Norse in Tolkien's Middle-earth. Toronto [Ontario]: Toronto University Press. ISBN 978-1-4426-2725-3. OCLC 903968395.
