= Marjorie Burns =

American scholar of English literature

Marjorie Jean Burns is a scholar of English literature, best known for her studies of J. R. R. Tolkien.

== Biography ==
Marjorie Jean Burns was born in 1940. She gained her PhD at the University of California, Berkeley.

She is an emeritus professor of English at Portland State University, having worked on the faculty there for over thirty years. She lectured on English literature and Tolkien, writing many papers on these topics. She married Don S. Willner. She has four children, and describes herself as "a traveler, a kayaker, a rock climber, and a lover of adventures". With Scott Burns she co-authored the 2019 book Cataclysms on the Columbia, the Great Missoula Floods.

Burns co-edited the 2006 J. R. R. Tolkien Encyclopedia, and contributed four articles to it on topics including Old Norse literature and the giant spider Shelob.

== Reception ==
=== Perilous Realms ===
C. W. Sullivan III, reviewing her 2005 book Perilous Realms for the Journal of Folklore Research, found it both praiseworthy and problematic. He liked Burns's discussion of the English prejudice against the Celts, and of Tolkien's dislike of frivolous post-Shakespeare fairies. He noted that many of the chapters were published as separate papers, so there was some repetition, and she had failed to note the Celtic origin of Sir Gawain. But she had written a "valuable window into Tolkien's sources"; he liked the way he blended "Celtic enchantment and Norse vitality", and the book was accessible to scholars and the public alike.

Kathryn Stelmach, reviewing the book for Comitatus, found her exploration of Norse "more compelling" than her "overly simplified" approach to the "Celtic" identity and the use of unreliable sources.

== Books ==
- 2005 Perilous Realms: Celtic and Norse in Tolkien’s Middle-earth , University of Toronto Press.
- 2007 On Tolkien: Interviews, Reminiscences, and Other Essays (ed., with Douglas A. Anderson), Houghton Mifflin.
