= Ancestry as guide to character in Tolkien's legendarium =

Theme in Tolkien's Middle-earth writings

In Tolkien's legendarium, ancestry provides a guide to character. The apparently genteel Hobbits of the Baggins family turn out to be worthy protagonists of The Hobbit and The Lord of the Rings. Bilbo Baggins is seen from his family tree to be both a Baggins and an adventurous Took. Similarly, Frodo Baggins has some relatively outlandish Brandybuck blood. Among the Elves of Middle-earth, as described in The Silmarillion, the highest are the peaceful Vanyar, whose ancestors conformed most closely to the divine will, migrating to Aman and seeing the light of the Two Trees of Valinor; the lowest are the mutable Teleri; and in between are the conflicted Noldor. Scholars have analysed the impact of ancestry on Elves such as the creative but headstrong Fëanor, who makes the Silmarils. Among Men, Aragorn, hero of The Lord of the Rings, is shown by his descent from Kings, Elves, and an immortal Maia to be of royal blood, destined to be the true King who will restore his people. Scholars have commented that in this way, Tolkien was presenting a view of character from Norse mythology, and an Anglo-Saxon view of kingship, though others have called his implied views racist.

== Context ==
J. R. R. Tolkien was an English author and philologist of ancient Germanic languages, specialising in Old English, the language of the Anglo-Saxons; he spent much of his career as a professor at the University of Oxford. He is best known for his novels about his invented Middle-earth, The Hobbit and The Lord of the Rings, and for the posthumously published The Silmarillion which provides a more mythical narrative about earlier ages. These have been so influential that has been called the "father" of modern fantasy. He invented several peoples for Middle-earth, including Elves, Dwarves, Hobbits, Orcs, Trolls, and Eagles. (Note: Carpenter 2023, Letter 142 to Robert Murray, 2 December 1953)

== Ancestry by race ==
=== Hobbit family trees ===
A Small Part (Note: The full tree is shown in the article on Frodo Baggins.) of the Genealogy of the Baggins Family of Hobbits,
from Appendix C of The Lord of the Rings, (Note: Tolkien 1955, Appendix C Family Trees)
annotated to show the inheritance of character

Balbo Baggins | Berylla Boffin
Laura Grubb | Mungo | Largo | Tanta Hornblower
Bungo Baggins (bourgeois) | Belladonna Took (adventurous) | Fosco | Ruby Bolger
Bilbo | Dora | Drogo Baggins (bourgeois) | Primula Brandybuck (outlandish)
Frodo

Tolkien's Middle-earth family trees have multiple functions, including establishing the characters' lineages and the relationships between them, and helping to create an impression of depth. Apart from these, a key function is to show how different ancestries, and hence in Tolkien's view different aspects of character, come together in his protagonists. The Tolkien scholar Jason Fisher explains that the apparently home-loving but in fact also adventurous and resourceful Bilbo Baggins, for instance, was born to a genteel Baggins and an adventurous Took, while his similarly conflicted cousin (often familiarly described as his nephew) and heir Frodo was the child of a Baggins and a relatively outlandish Brandybuck. Thus, character is explained and predicted by ancestry. Tolkien has his Hobbits share this belief; families were important to them, and they were extremely fond of studying their own genealogy, as illustrated, too, by the multiple Hobbit family trees in the appendices of The Lord of the Rings. Tolkien stated directly in the prologue: (Note: Tolkien 1954a, prologue)

All hobbits were, in any case, clannish and reckoned up their relationships with great care. They drew long and elaborate family-trees with innumerable branches. In dealing with hobbits it is important to remember who is related to whom, and in what degree.

Bilbo's and Frodo's ancestry analysed by geography of the Shire and Hobbit family character. Bilbo inherits bourgeois Baggins and adventurous Took, suiting him both for life in the Shire and for the adventure described in The Hobbit. Frodo inherits bourgeois Baggins and outlandish Buckland, suiting him for the quest of The Lord of the Rings, but leaving him ultimately unsettled.

The ancestry of Bilbo and Frodo involved the Boffin and Bolger families alongside the better-known Tooks and Brandybucks. Tolkien had drawn up family trees for the Boffins and Bolgers, providing additional background on the character of the central Hobbit figures, but these were left out of the appendices to save space. (Note: The two family trees can be seen at Boffins and Bolgers.)

=== Elvish splinterings ===
In the First Age, the Elves awoke at Cuiviénen in Middle-earth, and many of them (green titles for kindreds) migrated (arrows) westwards to Valinor in Aman, splintering into different groups according to the quality of their ancestry. (Note: Tolkien 1994, "Quendi and Eldar")

In the long and complex process of the Sundering of the Elves, Tolkien consistently shows that the highest Elves are those who deviated least from their initial uncorrupted state: they complied with the will of the Valar, travelled to the blessed realm of Valinor where they saw the light of the Two Trees, and continued to speak the highest language, Quenya. Conversely, the lowest Elves, the Avari, refused to make the journey, never saw the light, and fragmented into many kindreds with different languages as they eventually spread out across Middle-earth. The Tolkien scholars Tom Shippey and Verlyn Flieger both note that Tolkien thus intended ancestry to be a guide to character. The differences between the various Elvish languages mirror both the Sundering and the events of The Silmarillion.

Flieger states that the three major groups of Elves who set out on the journey to Valinor, the Eldar, each had their own character, which the reader needs to grasp to understand what drives the protagonists of The Silmarillion, by way of their personal membership of one or more of these groups.

Verlyn Flieger's analysis of the effect of history on the character of the Eldar
| Group | History | Character from history |
|---|---|---|
| Vanyar | First to set out, stay in Valinor for ever after arriving; close to the godlike Valar | Highest of the Elves; settled in the light and in themselves |
| Noldor | Set out next, go to Valinor and leave again | Torn both ways, creative, artistic, seeking knowledge, skilful, loving words, with potential for both good and ill |
| Teleri | Last to set out, least eager for the light, most numerous | "Vacillate, hesitate, are changeful in mind and spirit"; they are "the Singers", love water, always live by it, are mutable |

Shippey writes that The Silmarillion echoes Norse mythology in its belief that character is determined by ancestry, and that one perhaps needs to study the family trees to see clearly how it all works. He gives the example of Fëanor, the impetuous creator of the Silmarils, and his relatives:

Tom Shippey's analysis of the effect of Eldar ancestry on character
| Person | Ancestry | Character from ancestry |
|---|---|---|
| Fëanor | pure Noldor from both father and mother | Creative, headstrong, selfish |
| Fëanor's half-brothers Finarfin and Fingolfin | mother is of "'senior' race", Vanyar | "Superior" to Fëanor "in restraint and generosity" |
| Finarfin's children Finrod and Galadriel | mother is of "junior" race, Teleri | Relatively sympathetic |
| Fingolfin's children, e.g. Aredhel | "mixed Noldor/Vanyar" | "Reckless" |
| Fëanor's sons | pure Noldor | Aggressive, unsympathetic |

Shippey comments that one way to read The Silmarillion is to assume that "'character' is in a sense fixed, static, even diagrammatic." He states that this was a common belief in medieval times, giving the example of the Old English proverb which asserts that "a man shows what he's like when he can do what he wants", i.e. their character was assumed to be built-in. Similarly in Norse mythology, the nature of each person in a saga is, Shippey writes, stated when they are introduced; the rest of the story just demonstrates how that plays out in practice.

=== Mannish lineages ===
Half-elven family tree (Note: Tolkien 1977, "Of the Rings of Power and the Third Age": Family Trees I and II: "The house of Finwë and the Noldorin descent of Elrond and Elros", and "The descendants of Olwë and Elwë") (Note: Tolkien 1955, Appendix A: Annals of the Kings and Rulers, I The Númenórean Kings)

Melian the Maia | Thingol of the Teleri | House of Bëor | House of Haleth | House of Hador | Finwë of the Noldor | Indis of the Vanyar | Olwë of the Teleri
Barahir | Belegund | Hareth | Galdor | Fingolfin | Finarfin | Eärwen
Lúthien | Beren | Rían | Huor | Húrin | Turgon | Elenwë
Dior | Nimloth | Tuor | Idril
Eluréd | Elurín | Elwing | Eärendil | Celeborn | Galadriel
Elros | Elrond | Celebrían
22 Kings of Númenor and Lords of Andúnië
Elendil
Isildur | Anárion
22 Kings of Arnor and Arthedain | 27 Kings of Gondor
Arvedui | Fíriel
15 Dúnedain; Chieftains
Aragorn | Arwen | Elladan | Elrohir
Eldarion | daughters

Colour key:
| Colour | Description |
|---|---|
| | Elves |
| | Men |
| | Maiar |
| | Half-elven |
| | Half-elven who chose the fate of Elves |
| | Half-elven who chose the fate of mortal Men |

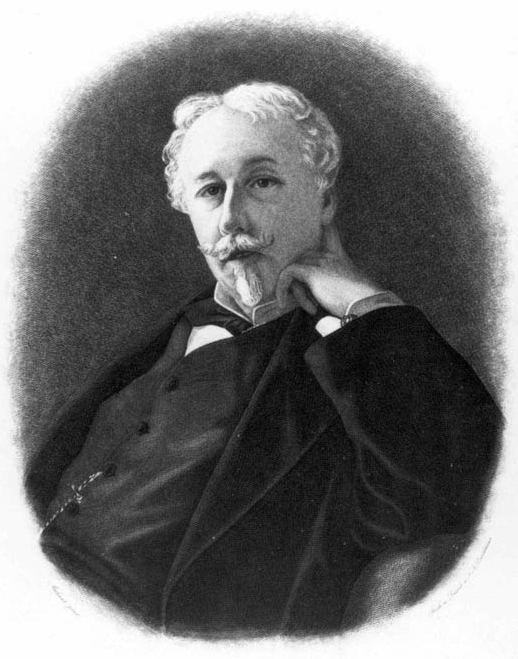
Robert Stuart has likened Tolkien's views on ancestry to those of the racist Arthur de Gobineau. 1876 portrait by the Comtesse de la Tour

Aragorn, hero of The Lord of the Rings, appears as a Man, and is described as such with the epithet Dúnadan, "Man of the West". His blood is however richer than that, as he can trace his ancestry back to the marriage of Eärendil and Elwing, both half-Elven and thus higher than mortal Men. Further, Elwing's ancestry goes back to the marriage of Thingol, the Elven King of Doriath, and Melian, a Maia or immortal spirit, one of the angelic Ainur. As far as his Elven pedigree is concerned, he was not only of the Teleri ("Those who come last") via Thingol; Eärendil was descended via Idril Celebrindal from Finwë of the Noldor ("Deep Elves") and Indis of the Vanyar ("The Fair"). These two groups were the highest of the Elves, and unlike the Teleri kept the faith by migrating all the way to Aman and thus saw the light of the Two Trees of Valinor. (Note: Tolkien 1977, ch. 24 "Of the Voyage of Eärendil and the War of Wrath") Aragorn was thus not only of a long royal lineage, and not only with an admixture of Elvish blood: it was the best possible, being both from high Elves and Elvish kings.

The Tolkien scholar Angela Nicholas argues that Aragorn's combined Man, Elf, and Maia ancestry "infuses divinity into his character." Judy Ann Ford and Robin Anne Reid write in Tolkien Studies that while the destruction of the One Ring prevents Sauron from taking over the whole of Middle-earth, the "true king", Aragorn, is required "to restore the world of men to its former glory." Aragorn has this destiny in his epithets, "for in the high tongue of old [Quenya] I am Elessar, the Elfstone, and Envinyatar, the Renewer'". (Note: Tolkien 1955 book 5, ch. 8 "The Houses of Healing") Ford and Reid comment that Tolkien has made Aragorn conform to the Anglo-Saxon ideal of kingship, noting that their kings "claimed descent from [the god] Woden", and further that "This divine ancestry was believed to endow royal blood with a portion of divine wisdom and supernatural power."

In his 2022 book Tolkien, Race, and Racism in Middle-earth, Robert Stuart on the other hand describes Tolkien's emphasis on Aragorn's ancestry as "aristocratic racism", likening Tolkien's implied views on race to those of the French 19th century diplomat Arthur de Gobineau, which he characterises as "anti-democratic, anti-national and, above all, anti-modern".

== Sources ==
- Carpenter, Humphrey (1977). J. R. R. Tolkien: A Biography. New York: Ballantine Books. ISBN 978-0-04-928037-3.
- Carpenter, Humphrey, ed. (2023) [1981]. The Letters of J. R. R. Tolkien: Revised and Expanded Edition. New York: HarperCollins. ISBN 978-0-35-865298-4.
- Dickerson, Matthew (2013) [2007]. "Elves: Kindreds and Migrations". In Drout, Michael D. C. (ed.). J.R.R. Tolkien Encyclopedia. Routledge. pp. 152–154. ISBN 978-0-415-86511-1.
- Fisher, Jason (2013) [2007]. "Family Trees". In Drout, Michael D. C. (ed.). J.R.R. Tolkien Encyclopedia. Routledge. pp. 188–189. ISBN 978-0-415-86511-1.
- Flieger, Verlyn (1983). "Light into Darkness". Splintered Light: Logos and Language in Tolkien's World. William B. Eerdmans Publishing Company. pp. 88–131. ISBN 978-0-8028-1955-0.
- Shippey, Tom (2001). J. R. R. Tolkien: Author of the Century. HarperCollins. ISBN 978-0261-10401-3.
- Shippey, Tom (2005) [1982]. The Road to Middle-Earth: How J. R. R. Tolkien Created a New Mythology (Third ed.). HarperCollins. ISBN 978-0-261-10275-0.
- Tolkien, J. R. R. (1954a). The Fellowship of the Ring. The Lord of the Rings. Boston: Houghton Mifflin. OCLC 9552942.
- Tolkien, J. R. R. (1955). The Return of the King. The Lord of the Rings. Boston: Houghton Mifflin. OCLC 519647821.
- Tolkien, J. R. R. (1977). Christopher Tolkien (ed.). The Silmarillion. Boston: Houghton Mifflin. ISBN 978-0-395-25730-2.
- Tolkien, J. R. R. (1994). Christopher Tolkien (ed.). The War of the Jewels. Boston: Houghton Mifflin. ISBN 0-395-71041-3.
