= The Children of Húrin =

Novel by J. R. R. Tolkien

- Front cover of hardback edition
- Editor: Christopher Tolkien
- Author: J. R. R. Tolkien
- Illustrator: Alan Lee
- Cover artist: Alan Lee
- Language: English
- Subject: Tolkien's legendarium
- Genre: Epic Fantasy; Tragedy
- Publisher: HarperCollins (UK); Houghton Mifflin (US)
- Publication date: 17 April 2007
- Publication place: United Kingdom
- Media type: Print (hardback, paperback); audiobook; e-book
- Pages: 320
- ISBN: 978-0-618-89464-2
- OCLC: 78790549
- Dewey Decimal: 823/.912 22
- LC Class: PR6039.O32 N37 2007
- Followed by: Beren and Lúthien

The Children of Húrin is a 2007 epic fantasy novel by J. R. R. Tolkien. He wrote the original version of the story in the late 1910s, revising it several times later, but did not complete it before his death in 1973. His son, Christopher Tolkien, edited the manuscripts to form a consistent narrative, and published it in 2007 as an independent work. The book is illustrated by Alan Lee. The story is one of the three "Great Tales" set in the First Age of Tolkien's Middle-earth, the other two being Beren and Lúthien and The Fall of Gondolin. All three stories are briefly summarised in the 1977 book The Silmarillion.

The book was mostly well received by critics, though some found it overblown or too fragmentary. Some critics wondered if it was suitable only for existing Tolkien aficionados, given the prose style and the large cast of characters, while others thought that despite its flaws it had the potential to reach a wider readership. Scholars have identified multiple themes in the tale, including evil, free will, predestination, heroism, courage, and the noble outlaw in the wilderness. The book's initial sales were double the U.S. publisher's expectations; it reached number one on The New York Times's Hardcover Fiction Best Seller list.

== Background ==
=== Author ===
J. R. R. Tolkien was an English author and philologist of ancient Germanic languages, specialising in Old English, the language of the Anglo-Saxons; he spent much of his career as a professor at the University of Oxford. He is best known for his novels about his invented Middle-earth, The Hobbit and The Lord of the Rings, and for the posthumously published The Silmarillion which provides a more mythical narrative about earlier ages.

The story of The Children of Húrin is one of Tolkien's three "great tales" set in the First Age of Middle-earth, the other two being Beren and Lúthien and The Fall of Gondolin. (Note: Tolkien 2007, pp. 269–282 "The Evolution of the Great Tales")

=== In-universe ===
Middle-earth is populated by Men, Elves, Dwarves, and Orcs, as well as divine beings, the Valar and the Maiar. The history and descent of the main characters begins five hundred years before the action of the book, when the evil Vala Morgoth escapes from the Blessed Realm of Valinor to the north-west of Middle-earth. From his fortress of Angband, he endeavours to gain control of the whole of Middle-earth, unleashing a war with the Elves that dwell in the land of Beleriand to the south. However, the Elves manage to stay his assault, and most of their realms remain unconquered; one of the most powerful of these is Doriath, ruled by Thingol. Later, the Noldorin Elves forsake Valinor and pursue Morgoth to Middle-earth to take vengeance upon him. Together with the Sindar of Beleriand, they lay siege to Angband, and establish new strongholds and realms in Middle-earth, including Hithlum ruled by Fingon, Nargothrond by Finrod Felagund and Gondolin by Turgon.

Three centuries pass, during which the first Men appear in Beleriand. These are the Edain, descendants of those Men who have rebelled against the rule of Morgoth's servants and journeyed westward. Most of the Elves welcome them, and they are given fiefs throughout Beleriand. The House of Bëor rules over the land of Ladros, the Folk of Haleth retreat to the forest of Brethil, and the lordship of Dor-lómin is granted to the House of Hador. Later, other Men enter Beleriand, the Easterlings, many of them in secret league with Morgoth. Eventually Morgoth manages to break the Siege of Angband in the Battle of Sudden Flame. The House of Bëor is destroyed and the Elves and Edain suffer heavy losses, but the realm of Dor-lómin remains unconquered; its lordship has passed to Húrin.

== Plot summary ==
Túrin, son of Húrin is a Man who lives in Dor-lómin. Húrin is taken prisoner by Morgoth after the Battle of Unnumbered Tears; Túrin is sent by his mother, Morwen, to live in the Elf-realm Doriath for protection after Easterlings invade their hometown. Morwen gives birth to Niënor, a girl. Morgoth curses Húrin and all his family, that evil will befall them for their whole lives.

King Thingol of Doriath takes Túrin as a foster-son. Túrin befriends Beleg, an expert hunter. Túrin accidentally causes the death of the King's counsellor Saeros, who attempts to jump a ravine while fleeing a wrathful Túrin. Túrin refuses to return to Doriath to face judgement and lives as an outlaw. Thingol pardons him and lets Beleg search for him.

Túrin becomes captain of a band of outlaws. Beleg locates the band while Túrin is absent; the outlaws leave him tied to a tree until he agrees to give them information. Túrin returns in time to cut Beleg free and, horrified by the outlaws' actions, resolves to forsake his cruel habits. Beleg tells him of the king's pardon but Túrin refuses to return to Doriath. Túrin and his men capture Mîm, a Petty-dwarf, who leads them to the caves at Amon Rûdh. Beleg returns to Túrin, who welcomes him. The outlaws resent the elf's presence and Mîm grows to hate him. Mîm betrays the outlaws to orcs; Túrin's entire band is killed, save for Beleg and Túrin. The orcs take Túrin towards Angband, leaving Beleg chained to a rock. Beleg escapes and pursues Túrin. Beleg happens across a mutilated elf, Gwindor of Nargothrond, sleeping in the forest of Taur-nu-Fuin. They enter the orc camp at night and carry Túrin, asleep, from the camp. Beleg begins to cut Túrin's bonds with his sword Anglachel, but the sword slips and cuts Túrin. Túrin, mistaking Beleg for an orc, kills Beleg with his own sword. When a flash of lightning reveals Beleg's face, Túrin falls into a frenzy. He refuses to leave Beleg's body until morning, when Gwindor is able to bury the elf. Túrin takes Anglachel but remains witless with grief.

Túrin and Gwindor proceed to Nargothrond. Túrin becomes King Orodreth's chief counsellor and commander of his forces, and leads the Elves to considerable victories. Against all advice, Túrin refuses to hide Nargothrond from Morgoth or to avoid full-scale battle. Morgoth sends an orc-army commanded by the dragon, Glaurung; Nargothrond is defeated. The orcs, crossing easily over the bridge that Túrin had built, sack Nargothrond. Túrin returns as the prisoners are led away by the orcs, and encounters Glaurung. The dragon enchants and tricks him into returning to Dor-lómin to seek out Morwen and Niënor instead of rescuing the prisoners—among whom is Finduilas, Orodreth's daughter, who loved him.

In Dor-lómin, Túrin learns that Morwen and Niënor are in Doriath, and that Glaurung deceived him into letting Finduilas go to her death. He tracks Finduilas' captors to the forest of Brethil, only to learn she has been murdered. Grief-stricken, Túrin seeks sanctuary among the folk of Haleth. Túrin renames himself Turambar, "Master of Doom" in Quenya, and gradually supplants Brandir, Brethil's lame chieftain.

In Doriath, Morwen and Niënor hear rumours of Túrin's deeds; Morwen determines either to find Túrin or to hear news of his death. Against Thingol's advice, she rides out of Doriath alone; Niënor conceals herself among Mablung's riders whom Thingol sends to follow and protect Morwen. At Nargothrond, Mablung encounters Glaurung, who scatters the elves. Glaurung discovers Niënor's identity and enchants her so that her mind is made blank; she forgets her name and how to speak.

Mablung attempts to return to Doriath alone with Niënor. The two become stranded in the wilderness, and in an orc attack, Niënor runs into the woods and is lost. She collapses near Brethil on the grave of Finduilas, where Turambar finds her. He brings her back to the town, where she recovers the use of speech, but with no memory of her past life. Niënor and Turambar fall in love. They marry, not realising their kinship, and Niënor becomes pregnant.

Glaurung returns to exterminate the men of Brethil. Turambar leads an expedition to cut him off, and stabs Glaurung from beneath. As Glaurung lies dying, Turambar pulls his sword from the dragon's belly; blood spurts onto his hand and burns him. He faints; Niënor finds him and mistakes his swoon for death. In a last effort of malice, Glaurung opens his eyes and informs her that she and Turambar are brother and sister. Glaurung dies, and his spell of forgetfulness passes from Niënor. Remembering that her unborn child was begotten in incest, she drowns herself. When Turambar wakes, Brandir informs him of Niënor's death and of their true relationship as siblings, as he had overheard the dragon's words. Turambar accuses Brandir of leading Niënor to her death and publishing Glaurung's lies. He kills Brandir. Mablung confirms Brandir's tale, and Turambar kills himself with his sword.

The main narrative ends with Túrin's burial. Appended to this is an extract from The Wanderings of Húrin, which recounts how Húrin is at last released by Morgoth and comes to his children's grave. There he finds Morwen, who dies in her husband's arms.

== Publication history ==
The Children of Húrin was published on 17 April 2007, by HarperCollins in the United Kingdom and Canada, and by Houghton Mifflin in the United States. Alan Lee, illustrator of other fantasy works by J. R. R. Tolkien (The Hobbit and The Lord of the Rings) created the jacket painting, as well as the 33 illustrations within the book, eight of them full-page and in colour. Christopher Tolkien included a description of the evolution of the tale, several genealogical tables, and a redrawn map of Beleriand in the book. (Note: Tolkien 2007, Front Matter, Table of Contents)

== Analysis ==
=== Source texts ===
A brief version of the story formed the basis of chapter 21 of The Silmarillion, setting the tale in the context of the wars of Beleriand. Although based on the same texts used to complete the new book, the Silmarillion account leaves out the greater part of the tale. Other incomplete versions have been published in the Narn i Hîn Húrin in Unfinished Tales; Turambar and the Foalókë, in The Book of Lost Tales; and The Lay of the Children of Húrin, an early narrative poem in The Lays of Beleriand. None of these constitute a complete and mature narrative. Christopher Tolkien assembled them as follows: (Note: Tolkien 2007, pp. 283–292 "The Composition of the Text")

Christopher Tolkien's construction of The Children of Húrin
The Children of Húrin	Sources
Ch 1	Narn i Hîn Húrin
Ch 2	The Silmarillion, ch. 20 Nírnaeth Arnoediad
Chs 3–7	Narn i Hîn Húrin
Chs 8–12	The Silmarillion, with Narn i Hîn Húrin for the more developed sections, namely: the exploits of the outlaws in Dor-Cúarthol; Túrin's romantic connection with Finduilas; his debate with Gwindor over the Elves of Nargothrond's strategy for the fight against Morgoth; the coming of the Elves Gelmir and Arminas to the halls of Narog
Chs 13–18	Narn i Hîn Húrin (+ afterword)

=== Editorial process ===
Christopher Tolkien quoted his father's own words on his fictional universe, that he "had in mind to make a body of more or less connected legend... I would draw some of the great tales in fullness, and leave many only placed in the scheme, and sketched." He explained his editorial function as "presenting my father's long version of the legend of the Children of Húrin as an independent work, between its own covers, with a minimum of editorial presence, and above all in continuous narrative without gaps or interruptions, if this could be done without distortion or invention". Ethan Gilsdorf, reviewing the book, wrote of the editorial function that Christopher Tolkien "explains his editorial process this way: "While I have had to introduce bridging passages here and there in the piecing together of different drafts, there is no element of extraneous 'invention' of any kind, however slight." He had been criticized for having tampered with his father's text when constructing the connected narrative of The Silmarillion. In Gilsdorf's view, Christopher Tolkien's words must be a "pre-emptive strike ... meant to allay the fears of Tolkien's most persnickety readers." Christopher Tolkien explained that in Unfinished Tales "the story breaks off at the point where Beleg, having at last found Túrin among the outlaws, cannot persuade him to return to Doriath (pp. 115-119 in the new text), and does not take up again until the outlaws encounter the Petty-dwarves." He states that he used The Silmarillion to fill the gap. (Note: Tolkien 2007, p. 286) He had already explained in Unfinished Tales how he had used the Narn and The Silmarillion to achieve a complete tale of Túrin: "I have contrived a narrative, in scale commensurate with other parts of the Narn out of the existing materials ...; but from that point onwards, I have found it unprofitable to attempt it... I have cited isolated fragments from this part of the projected larger narrative."

=== Influences ===
The story, as already published in The Silmarillion and Unfinished Tales, is mainly based on the legend of Kullervo, a character from Elias Lönnrot's compilation of Finnish folklore poems, the Kalevala. Tolkien drew inspiration from the Kalevala for "The Story of Kullervo" in 1914, one of the earliest elements of his legendarium. This became the model for his tale of Túrin. Túrin (like Kullervo) also resembles Sigmund, the father of Sigurd in the Volsunga saga, in the incestuous relationship he had with his sister. In Richard Wagner's opera, Die Walküre (likewise drawn in part from the Volsung myths), Siegmund and Sieglinde are parallels of Túrin and Niënor. Túrin further resembles Sigurd himself, as both achieve great renown for the slaying of a dragon of immense power and magic. Túrin's suicide following an exchange of words with his sword is lifted essentially unchanged from Kullervo's tale in Kalevala.

Tolkien mentioned Túrin's resemblance to figures from Classical, Finnish, and Norse tales in a letter:

There is the Children of Húrin, the tragic tale of Túrin Turambar and his sister Níniel – of which Túrin is the hero: a figure that might be said (by people who like that sort of thing, though it is not very useful) to be derived from elements in Sigurd the Volsung, Oedipus, and the Finnish Kullervo. (Note: Carpenter 2023, letter No. 131 to Milton Waldman, late 1951)

The moral issues in The Children of Húrin have been compared to Tolkien's analysis of The Battle of Maldon that shows Tolkien's interest in the "theory of courage", and distinguish between arrogance and true courage. Túrin's decision to build a bridge at Nargothrond which enables the invasion by Morgoth's forces resembles the character Byrthtnoth from The Battle of Maldon.

=== Themes ===
The themes explored in the story include evil, free will and predestination. The book reflects also on heroism and courage. It has been suggested that Túrin's character is not only shaped by Morgoth's curse but that he himself is also partly responsible for his actions. The curse cannot completely control his free will, and Túrin displays traits like arrogance, pride and a desire for honour, that eventually cause the doom of his allies and family. Jesse Mitchell, in Mythlore, compares Túrin both to the Byronic hero and to the absurd hero of Camus's The Myth of Sisyphus.

Philip Vogel and Kenton Sena, in Journal of Tolkien Research, add the theme of the "noble outlaw archetype", which they compare to Joseph Campbell's American monomyth: Túrin sometimes thinks of himself as an outsider, but he comes from and returns to the Dor-lómin community. Further, they examine the role of wilderness, the perilous borderlands around civilized realms, in Túrin's life. Fleeing from Doriath, he goes into an exile of his own choosing in the wilderness, partly identifying as an outlaw fitting the "Wild Man archetype", partly rejecting the outlaws' desperate ways.

== Reception ==
The initial reviews following the publication of The Children of Húrin were mostly positive. Likening it to a Greek tragedy, the author Elizabeth Hand in The Washington Post called it "a bleak, darkly beautiful tale" which "possesses the mythic resonance and grim sense of inexorable fate". The screenwriter and novelist Frank Cottrell-Boyce, in The Independent, described the chapter "The Death of Túrin" as "dry, mad, humourless, hard-going and completely brilliant". Bryan Appleyard of The Sunday Times set The Children of Húrin above other Tolkien writings, noting its "intense and very grown-up manner" and "a real feeling of high seriousness". Maurice Chittenden of The Sunday Times commented that "it may merit an X-certificate" for its many violent deaths. The novelist Philip Hensher in The Daily Telegraph wrote that there were many reasons to detest the book, and enumerated them, but relented for its powerful final episode "in which an incestuous passion and a battle with a great dragon enfold each other". He disagreed with Tolkien about what gave power to his writing: Tolkien thought it was its links to antiquity; Hensher, for its modernity, referencing imperialism not feudalism, and an elf capable of evil.

The book received negative reviews (Note: Compare the literary reception of The Lord of the Rings.) from the Detroit Free Press which called it "dull and unfinished", Entertainment Weekly which described it as "awkward and immature" with an "impenetrable forest of names ... overstuffed with strangled syntax", and The Guardian, which stated that it was about "a derivative Wagnerian hero ... on a quasi-symbolic quest".

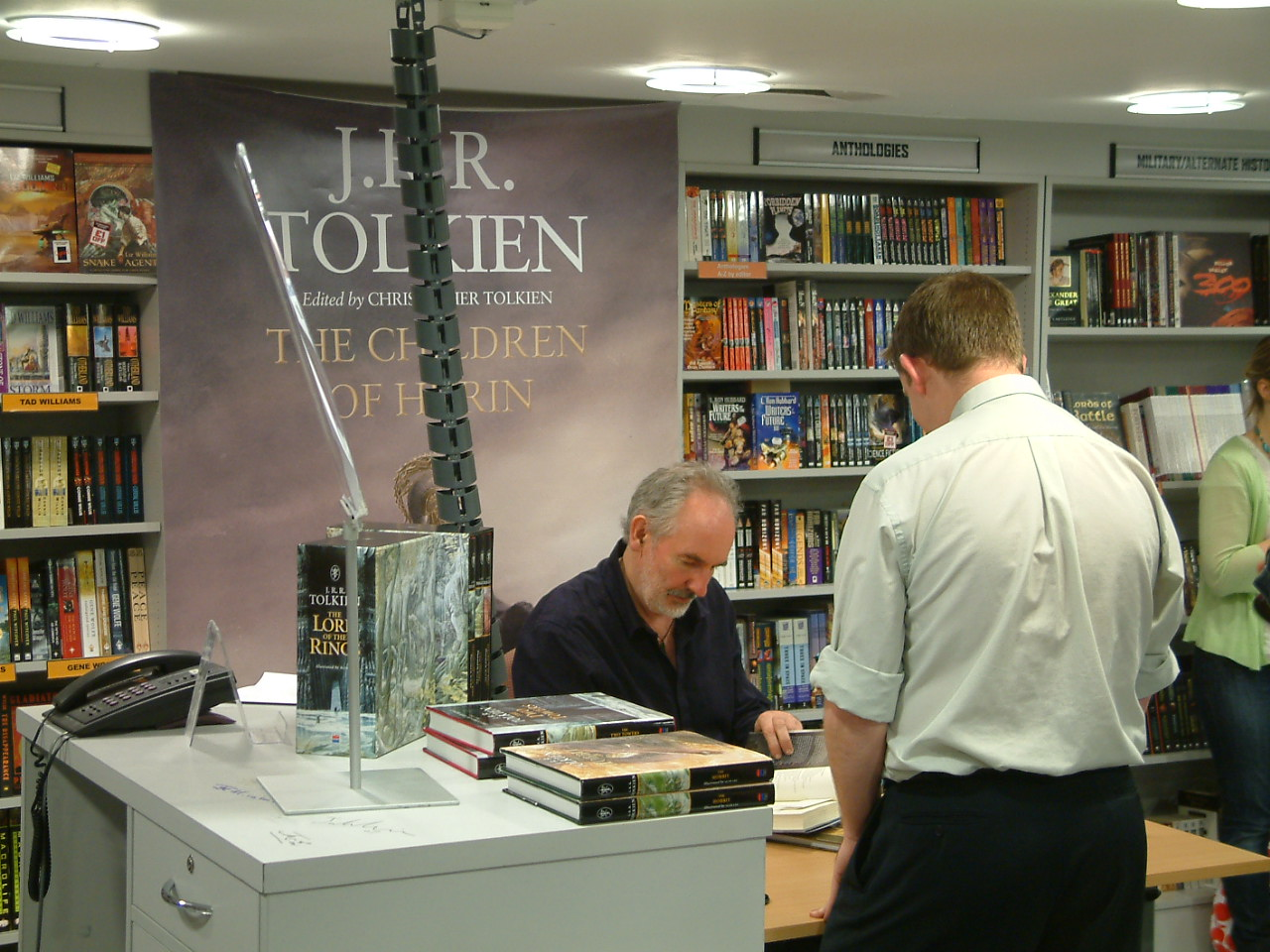
The illustrator Alan Lee signing copies of The Children of Húrin

Other critics distinguished two audiences. Tom Deveson of The Sunday Times said that "although J. R. R. Tolkien aficionados will be thrilled, others will find The Children of Hurin barely readable". Kelly Grovier from The Observer, on the other hand, stated that it "will please all but the most puritanical of his fans", referring to the scepticism about Christopher Tolkien's involvement. Jeremy Marshall of The Times generally echoed this, writing that "It is worthy of a readership beyond Tolkien devotees," although he thought it was flawed; he stated that "occasionally the prose is too stilted, the dialogue too portentous, the unexplained names too opaque". He presupposed that: "In The Children of Húrin we could at last have the successor to The Lord of the Rings that was so earnestly and hopelessly sought by Tolkien’s publishers in the late 1950s."

The Tolkien scholar Nicholas Birns commented that the book solves a longstanding problem, that Tolkien's Middle-earth writing is "really one giant work", whereas to a publisher, it consists of one complete novel, one children's book, and an enormous mass of background materials, some of them more or less consisting of stories. The Children of Húrin finally, in Birns's view, provides a "short, accessible" work from Tolkien's legendarium that can let people in; he contrasts this with Marcel Proust, whose admittedly great oeuvre remains hard to enter.

The Children of Húrin debuted at number one on The New York Times Hardcover Fiction Best Seller list. According to Houghton Mifflin, the U.S. publisher, 900,000 copies were in print worldwide in the first two weeks, double their initial expectations. HarperCollins, the U.K. publisher, claimed 330,000 copies were in print in the U.K. in the first two weeks.

== Sources ==
- Carpenter, Humphrey (1977). J. R. R. Tolkien: A Biography. New York: Ballantine Books. ISBN 978-0-04-928037-3.
- Carpenter, Humphrey, ed. (2023) [1981]. The Letters of J. R. R. Tolkien: Revised and Expanded Edition. New York: HarperCollins. ISBN 978-0-35-865298-4.
- Solopova, Elizabeth (2009). Languages, Myths and History: An Introduction to the Linguistic and Literary Background of J. R. R. Tolkien's Fiction. New York City: North Landing Books. ISBN 978-0-9816607-1-4.
- Tolkien, J. R. R. (1980). Christopher Tolkien (ed.). Unfinished Tales. Boston: Houghton Mifflin. ISBN 978-0-395-29917-3.
- Tolkien, J. R. R. (2007). Christopher Tolkien (ed.). The Children of Húrin. London: HarperCollins. ISBN 0-007-24622-6.
