= Tolkien's Middle-earth family trees =

Component of Tolkien's writings

Tolkien's Middle-earth family trees contribute to the impression of depth and realism in the stories set in his fantasy world by showing that each character is rooted in history with a rich network of relationships. J. R. R. Tolkien included multiple family trees in both The Lord of the Rings and The Silmarillion; they are variously for Elves, Dwarves, Hobbits, and Men.

The family trees gave Tolkien, a philologist, a way of exploring and developing the etymologies and relationships of the names of his characters. They imply, too, the fascination of his Hobbit characters with their family history. A further function was to show how aspects of character derive from ancestry.

== Genealogies ==
A Part (Note: The full tree is shown in the article on Frodo Baggins.) of the Genealogy of the Baggins Family of Hobbits, from Appendix C of The Lord of the Rings (Note: Tolkien 1955, Appendix C Family Trees) It shows among other things that the Bagginses had married into both Merry's family, the Brandybucks and Pippin's family, the Tooks. In Tolkien's theory that character derives from ancestry, this suggests that adventurous Took and outlandish Brandybuck combined with genteel Baggins nature in the characters of Bilbo and Frodo.

Balbo Baggins	Berylla Boffin
Laura Grubb	Mungo	Pansy	Fastolph Bolger	Ponto	Mimosa Bunce	Largo	Tanta Hornblower
Bungo	Belladonna Took	Longo	Camellia Sackville	Bingo	Chica Chubb	Fosco	Ruby Bolger
Bilbo	Otho Sackville-Baggins	Lobelia Bracegirdle	Falco Chubb-Baggins	?	Dora	Drogo	Primula Brandybuck
Lotho	Poppy	Filibert Bolger	Frodo

=== The Lord of the Rings ===
The appendices to The Lord of the Rings provide family trees for Dwarves, Hobbits, and Men. The Hobbit trees are introduced with the words "The names given in these Trees are only a selection from many." (Note: Tolkien 1955, Appendix A I The Numenorean Kings [Men] (lists of the Kings and Queens; Heirs of Isildur; Heirs of Anarion); II The House of Eorl, list of The Kings of the Mark; III Durin's Folk [Dwarves], tree of Durin the Deathless; appendix C Family Trees [of Hobbits]: Baggins of Hobbiton; Took of Great Smials; Brandybuck of Buckland; The Longfather-Tree of Master Samwise) Their development is chronicled in The Peoples of Middle-earth; it records that the Boffin and Bolger family trees were typed up for inclusion in Appendix C but were dropped at the last moment, apparently for reasons of space. (Note: Tolkien 1996, chapter 3 "The Family Trees". The trees are online at Tolkien Gateway.)

=== The Silmarillion ===
The Silmarillion provides family trees for the Elves Finwë, father of Fëanor, and Olwë, ancestor of Galadriel and Lúthien; the Man Bëor the Old, ancestor of Beren, Húrin, and Túrin; and of Hador, ancestor of Eärendil the mariner. (Note: Tolkien 1977, after "Of the Rings of Power and the Third Age") In The Silmarillion, Tolkien described an extraordinarily complex set of family relationships, feuds, and migrations of family subgroups within the various lineages of Elves. The lengthy course of development of all these is detailed by Christopher Tolkien in Unfinished Tales, The Book of Lost Tales II, and The Lays of Beleriand. The family trees and resulting populations have been explored by Tom Loback in Mythlore.

== Effects ==
Jason Fisher, in the J. R. R. Tolkien Encyclopedia, writes that Tolkien's family trees serve multiple functions. They define the ancestry of both heroes and villains, along with all their relationships, just as in the medieval Icelandic sagas which Tolkien studied carefully. In this way, Tolkien was placing the Middle-earth sagas in a definite tradition. Secondly, the family trees provide a powerful impression of depth, bringing "essential details, texture, and verisimilitude" to his secondary world. In The Two Towers, the Wizard Gandalf jokingly warns Théoden, King of Rohan, of the ways of Hobbits with family affairs: (Note: Tolkien 1954, book 3, ch. 8 "The Road to Isengard")

'You do not know your danger, Theoden', interrupted Gandalf. 'These hobbits will sit on the edge of ruin and discuss the pleasures of the table, or the small doings of their fathers, grandfathers, and great-grandfathers, and remoter cousins to the ninth degree, if you encourage them with undue patience.'

Thirdly, the trees allowed him, as a philologist, to develop, explore, and play with the etymologies and relationships of the names of his characters, something that he much enjoyed. (Note: Many of the Hobbit surnames in the Baggins family tree, such as Boffin, Bolger, Bunce, Chubb, and Hornblower are real English surnames. For example, Boffin's Bakery was a cake shop in Oxford.) Fourthly, the family trees helped to guide him while writing to avoid mistakes in describing relationships. Fifthly, the Hobbit-style genealogies imitate the hobbitic fascination with family history; Tolkien maintained the framing fiction that The Lord of the Rings was, in fact, the Red Book of Westmarch written entirely by Hobbits. Tolkien says as much in the novel's prologue:

All hobbits were, in any case, clannish and reckoned up their relationships with great care. They drew long and elaborate family-trees with innumerable branches. In dealing with hobbits it is important to remember who is related to whom, and in what degree. (Note: Tolkien 1954a, prologue)

Yet another function was to show how different ancestries, and hence different aspects of character, come together in some of the characters. Bilbo Baggins, eponymous protagonist of The Hobbit, was born to a genteel Baggins and an adventurous Took, while his cousin (often familiarly described as his nephew) and heir Frodo was the child of a Baggins and a relatively outlandish Brandybuck. Finally, the trees mention which Hobbits had children and which did not, thus giving the impression that the story continues after the end of the book, reinforcing the impression of depth.

Fisher states that in The Silmarillion, the family trees work the same way, but the tales, told as ancient legends rather than in-the-moment action, are narrated from the points of view of Elves or sometimes of Men (Edain). Here the trees help with a different function, namely to visualise the splitting and mixing of family lines, mirroring the bitter family feuds among The Silmarillion's Elves.

== Construction ==
Malcolm Forbes, reviewing Catherine McIlwaine's exhibition of Tolkien's Middle-earth artefacts at the Bodleian Library, commented that "his realm of Middle-earth [is] the product of a fecund imagination, fierce intelligence and creative prowess. Few fantasy writers so meticulously map their kingdoms, or invent legends, family trees and even languages for their characters."

Dwayne Thorpe comments in Mythlore that family trees are one of the elements that Tolkien used to make Middle-earth seem real:

Elves and dwarves are drawn partly from tradition, of course. But Tolkien uses the same process to make his own inventions: ents who are as ancient as their immemorial forest, and who boom and mutter about history and tales and the growth of words like a certain prominent philologist; the regal, civilized men of Gondor with their complex system of law, seven-volumed history, and seven-tiered city; the horsey riders of Rohan, their humanized horses, and the rolling horse-meadows which create both; and Hobbits, their furry toes, inns, six meals a day, and absorption in family trees drawn from the comfortable associations of rural Oxfordshire and the habits of Inklings. He was ingenious at abstracting qualities from their normal locations and fusing them with his own inventions to produce cultures, geography, languages, creatures.

== Sources ==
- Fisher, Jason (2013) [2007]. "Family Trees". In Drout, Michael D. C. (ed.). J.R.R. Tolkien Encyclopedia: Scholarship and Critical Assessment. Routledge. pp. 188–189. ISBN 978-0-415-86511-1.
- Forbes, Malcolm (30 June 2018). "Stunning new exhibition explores Tolkien's life, work and legacy". The National.
- Garth, John (2020). Tolkien's Worlds: The Places That Inspired the Writer's Imagination. Quarto Publishing. ISBN 978-0-7112-4127-5.
- Loback, Tom (1987). "The Kindreds, Houses & Population of the Elves during the First Age". Mythlore. 14 (1). article 7.
- Thorpe, Dwayne (1996). "Tolkien's Elvish Craft". Mythlore. 21 (1). article 47.
- Tolkien, J. R. R. (1954a). The Fellowship of the Ring. The Lord of the Rings. Boston: Houghton Mifflin. OCLC 9552942.
- Tolkien, J. R. R. (1954). The Two Towers. The Lord of the Rings. Boston: Houghton Mifflin. OCLC 1042159111.
- Tolkien, J. R. R. (1955). The Return of the King. The Lord of the Rings. Boston: Houghton Mifflin. OCLC 519647821.
- Tolkien, J. R. R. (1977). Christopher Tolkien (ed.). The Silmarillion. Boston: Houghton Mifflin. ISBN 978-0-395-25730-2.
- Tolkien, J. R. R. (1996). Christopher Tolkien (ed.). The Peoples of Middle-earth. Boston: Houghton Mifflin. ISBN 978-0-395-82760-4.
