= Galdor =

Galdor can refer to:

- Galdr, a magical song in some Germanic languages.
- Galdor, the father of Húrin in The Silmarillion.
