= Húrin =

Man in Tolkien's legendarium

- Tolkien character

In-universe information
- Aliases: Thalion, the Steadfast, Lord of Dor-lómin
- Race: Men
- Gender: Male
- Book(s): The Silmarillion, The Children of Húrin, The War of the Jewels, Unfinished Tales

Húrin is a fictional character in the Middle-earth legendarium of J. R. R. Tolkien. He is introduced in The Silmarillion as a hero of Men during the First Age, said to be the greatest warrior of both the Edain (Men of Númenor and their descendants) and all Men in Middle-earth. His actions, however, bring catastrophe and ruin to his family and to the people of Beleriand.

Scholars have remarked the power and grimness of the tale. Tom Shippey calls the scene where Húrin is freed after 28 years by the Dark Lord Morgoth the "lyric core" of the tale of the fall of Gondolin. Christopher Garbowski comments that when Húrin cries aloud, revealing the hidden entrance to Gondolin, the effect is quite unlike that of The Lord of the Rings. Helen Lasseter Freeh comments on the version in Unfinished Tales where Húrin and Morgoth discuss luck and fate in Middle-earth. Shippey remarks that Tolkien often provides double explanations of events throughout his Middle-earth writings, so that their cause could be luck, but could equally be fate, the will of the godlike Valar.

== Fictional history ==
[Húrin] was shorter in stature than other men of his kin; in this he took after his mother's people, but in all else he was like Hador his grandfather, fair of face and golden-haired, strong in body and fiery of mood. But the fire in him burned steadily, and he had great endurance of will. Of all Men of the North he knew most of the counsels of the Noldor. (Note: Tolkien 1980, Narn i Hîn Húrin, The childhood of Túrin)

Húrin is the elder son of Galdor of the House of Hador and Hareth of the Men of Haladin, who are Edain; his younger brother is Huor. (Note: Tolkien 1977, ch. 17 "Of the Coming of Men into the West") They live with their uncle Haldir in Dor-lómin in Beleriand, and join a war party against the Orcs. The brothers are cut off from their company and chased by Orcs in the Vale of Sirion. The Vala Ulmo, Lord of Waters, causes a mist to arise from the river, and they escape. Two Eagles bring them to the hidden Elvish city of Gondolin. King Turgon welcomes them, remembering Ulmo's prophecy that the House of Hador will aid Gondolin in its time of need. Turgon's nephew Maeglin urges that they not be allowed to leave, but Turgon overrides him; swearing secrecy, they return to Dor-lómin. (Note: Tolkien 2007, "The Childhood of Túrin", pp. 35–37)

Morgoth's orcs attack Hithlum, killing Húrin's father; Húrin chases the Orcs away and becomes the Lord of his people. He marries Morwen, who bears him a son, Túrin, and a daughter, Nienor. Húrin rides his horse Arroch, 'Noble horse', to battle alongside his brother. In the midst of battle he meets Turgon again. Losing the battle, Húrin and Huor take a stand, allowing Turgon to escape. Huor is killed, but Húrin fights until he is buried under a mountain of Orcs and Trolls. Gothmog Lord of Balrogs brings him to Morgoth's fortress, Angband. Morgoth tries to force Húrin to reveal where Gondolin is. When Húrin refuses, Morgoth curses him along with his kin and puts him on a high mountain peak in chains, and lets him see and hear from the seat the evils that will befall his son and daughter, but not the good they will do. Húrin is embittered to learn that his children, both under a dragon-spell, marry each other, conceive a child, and commit suicide. (Note: Tolkien 1977, ch. 21 "Of Túrin Turambar")

After twenty-eight years of imprisonment and the death of his children, Morgoth releases Húrin: "He had grown grim to look upon: his hair and beard were white and long, but there was a fell light in his eyes. He walked unbowed, and yet carried a great black staff; but he was girt with a sword." (Note: Tolkien 1994, "The Wanderings of Húrin", pp. 252, 297) He is brought to his old homelands, but enemies are living there. Seven outlaws join Húrin; they go to the Vale of Sirion. Húrin abandons his followers and seeks the entrance to Gondolin, but it is closed, and Turgon does not wish to allow him in. Húrin cries out against Turgon, revealing the location of Gondolin to Morgoth's spies, and leaves. Too late, Turgon changes his mind and sends Eagles, but they do not find Húrin. (Note: Tolkien 1980, "Narn i Hîn Húrin")

Húrin travels to the forest of Brethil where his son and daughter died, and meets Morwen at their grave, just before she dies. In anger and despair he seeks out the Folk of Haleth, blaming them for the deaths of his wife and children; a revolt ensues, killing the last Haladin. Hardang the Chieftain of Brethil fears and imprisons Húrin. A leader, Manthor, sets the people against Hardang; they kill him. Manthor too is killed; he asks Húrin: "Was not this your true errand, Man of the North: to bring ruin upon us to weigh against thine own?"

Húrin and the outlaws go to Nargothrond. They take the dragon's gold from the dwarf who had claimed it, to avenge his family. They bring the treasure, including the dwarves' necklace, the Nauglamír, to Doriath; they insult Thingol by giving the necklace as payment for his care of Húrin's kin. This brings a curse on Doriath, leading to its downfall. (Note: Tolkien 1977, ch. 22 "Of the Ruin of Doriath") Melian the Maia, queen of Doriath, uses kind words to reach Húrin's clouded mind. Húrin sees that all his deeds have only aided Morgoth. A broken man, he drowns himself in the sea, ending the life of the "mightiest of the warriors of mortal men".

== Descent of Húrin ==
Túrin–Tuor family tree

Bëor	Haladin
Bregolas	Haldad	Hador
Belegund	Baragund	Hareth	Galdor
Rían	Morwen	Húrin	Huor	Rían	Turgon
Túrin; Turambar	Urwen; Lalaith	Niënor; Níniel	Tuor; Eladar	Idril; Celebrindal
Elwing	Eärendil
Elros	Elrond

Colour key:
Colour	Description
	Elves
	Men
	Half-elven who chose the fate of Elves
	Half-Elven who chose the fate of mortal Men

== Analysis ==
=== Effects ===
The Tolkien scholar Tom Shippey writes that the "lyric core" of the story of the fall of Gondolin, the source of narrative dynamism amidst all the description and genealogy in The Silmarillion, is the scene where Húrin is set free after 28 years imprisoned by Morgoth. In his view, "everything in this scene is emblematic"; the sun sets behind the Mountains of Shadow, standing for the coming catastrophe, but "the real sunset is in Húrin's heart". The dynamism is revealed, Shippey writes, by asking who is at fault on this occasion: is it Húrin, for despair, or Turgon, for being suspicious? Shippey comments that to answer fully would be to retell "the whole unhappy story of Middle-earth." He explains that the matter hinges on "a conflict of kinship"; Húrin remembers from many years earlier how he suffered to help Turgon; but though Turgon knows Húrin's situation, the royal Elf "refuses to trust the man who saved him once", and does not relent until it is too late. It is thus vital to the scene, and to the whole story, that the reader appreciates why Húrin goes into this emotional sunset; and that in turn requires the reader to know about his kinship with Turgon, from the family tree.

Christopher Garbowski writes in the J.R.R. Tolkien Encyclopedia that the depiction of Húrin in The War of the Jewels, crying aloud in the wilderness by the hidden entrance to Gondolin, creates a very different and far less optimistic effect to that of The Lord of the Rings, which had already been written. The Vala Manwe sends an eagle to Turgon for help, but the account seems, writes Garbowski, to allow no time for the message to arrive. He calls Shippey's description of the scene, a "posed tableau", apt.

=== Tolkien's choices ===
Alex Lewis, writing in Mythlore, asserts that Tolkien introduced a historical bias into the tale of Húrin's coming to Gondolin. He suggests that Tolkien chose to favour Turgon at the expense of Maeglin, because Turgon was a direct ancestor of Elrond. Since in Tolkien's view ancestry indicated character, that meant that Turgon had to be spared the blame for the fall of Gondolin – Húrin had to take this blame in his place. Lewis comments that the long version in The Book of Lost Tales differs markedly from the account in The Silmarillion here. He notes that Tolkien started to revise the tale but never completed the revision. Lewis asserts, too, that "Hurin was a far better tactician than Fingon or Turgon. He had the best idea of keeping the high-ground advantage", putting this down to Tolkien's bias in favour of Elves over Men.

David Greenman, also in Mythlore, proposes a classical influence on Tolkien. He describes the sad tale of Húrin as "Aristotelian Epic-Tragedy", as defined in the Poetics in terms of Aristotelian elements such as "plot, ... spectacle, language, character, ... reversal, and catharsis".

The attorney Douglas Kane, writing in Tolkien Studies, discusses Húrin's trial as described in The Wanderings of Húrin, published in The War of the Jewels. He assaults Hardang with a stool; he is drugged and put on trial; Manthor advises him. Húrin "falsely charges" the people of Brethil with failing to help Morwen. Kane calls the tale "some of Tolkien's most incisive political commentary", citing "Húrin's cold comfort to Manthor on his deathbed": telling Manthor that his friendship "was rooted in self-interest", as he hoped to "use his defense of Húrin to further his own ambition to become the Chieftain."

=== Fate and free will ===
The Tolkien scholar Helen Lasseter Freeh notes that the longer version of the tale of Túrin Turambar in Unfinished Tales (the Narn) contains a dialogue between Morgoth and Húrin about fate and providence. Despite his imprisonment, Húrin insists that Morgoth cannot control everything. While Morgoth does not directly contradict this, he says he will spread a "cloud of Doom" on everyone Húrin loves, and "wherever they go, evil shall arise". Túrin lives a life of disaster, in which Freeh sees the hand of fate, which threatens to overwhelm Túrin's free will. Shippey comments that Morgoth is one of the Valar, whose power in the world appears as luck, or chance, or fate. Terrible things in the Narn seem to be coincidences; but, writes Shippey, Tolkien often gives double explanations of these events, one fate, one just accident.

== See also ==
- The Children of Húrin, a novel assembled by Christopher Tolkien from his father's fragmentary manuscripts
- The Lay of the Children of Húrin, an early alliterative poem telling of the tragic life of Húrin's son Túrin.
