= The Book of Lost Tales =

Collection of stories by J. R. R. Tolkien

- Volume 1, illustrated by John Howe
- Editor: Christopher Tolkien
- Author: J. R. R. Tolkien
- Language: English
- Series: The History of Middle-earth
- Subject: Tolkien's legendarium
- Genre: High fantasy; Literary studies
- Publisher: George Allen & Unwin (UK); Houghton Mifflin (US)
- Publication date: 1983 (Vol. 1); 1984 (Vol. 2)
- Publication place: United Kingdom
- Media type: Print
- Pages: 297 (Vol. 1, first edition); 400 (Vol. 2, first edition)
- ISBN: 0-395-35439-0: (Vol. 1); 0-395-36614-3 (Vol. 2)
- Followed by: The Lays of Beleriand

The Book of Lost Tales is a collection of early stories by the English writer J. R. R. Tolkien, published as the first two volumes of Christopher Tolkien's 12-volume series The History of Middle-earth, in which he presents and analyses the manuscripts of those stories, which were the earliest form (begun in 1917) of the complex fictional myths that would eventually form The Silmarillion. Each of the Tales is followed by notes and a detailed commentary by Christopher Tolkien.

For publication the book was split into two volumes: The Book of Lost Tales 1 (1983) and The Book of Lost Tales 2 (1984), but this is simply an editorial division. Each volume contains several "Lost Tales".

== Content ==
Navigable diagram of Tolkien's legendarium. The Book of Lost Tales is among his earliest Middle-earth writings.

=== Outline, with later equivalents in The Silmarillion ===
| The Book of Lost Tales (1917) | Storyteller | The Silmarillion (1977) |
Book I
| 1. "The Cottage of Lost Play" | Vairë | (Frame story omitted by Christopher Tolkien, to his later regret) |
| 2. "The Music of the Ainur" | Rúmil | "Ainulindalë" |
| 3. "The Coming of the Valar and the Building of Valinor" | Rúmil | "Valaquenta"; 1. "Of the Beginning of Days" |
| - | | 2. Of Aulë and Yavanna |
| 4. "The Chaining of Melko"; 5. "The Coming of the Elves and the Making of Kôr" | Meril-i-Turinqi | 3. "Of the Coming of the Elves and the Captivity of Melkor"; 4. "Of Thingol and Melian"; 5. "Of Eldamar and the Princes of the Eldalië" |
| 6. "The Theft of Melko and the Darkening of Valinor"; 7. "The Flight of the Noldoli" | Lindo | 6. "Of Fëanor and the Unchaining of Melkor"; 7. "Of the Silmarils and the Unrest of the Noldor"; 8. "Of the Darkening of Valinor"; 9. "Of the Flight of the Noldor" |
| 8. "The Tale of the Sun and Moon"; 9. "The Hiding of Valinor" | Lindo; Vairë | 11. "Of the Sun and Moon and the Hiding of Valinor" |
| 10. "Gilfanon's Tale: The Travail of the Noldoli and the Coming of Mankind"; – unwritten; 2 fragments and 2 outlines only | Gilfanon | 10. "Of the Sindar"; 12. "Of Men"; 13. "Of the Return of the Noldor"; 14. "Of Beleriand and its Realms"; 15. "Of the Noldor in Beleriand"; 16. "Of Maeglin"; 17. "Of the Coming of Men into the West"; 18. "Of the Ruin of Beleriand and the Fall of Fingolfin" |
Book II
| 1. "The Tale of Tinúviel" | Vëannë | 19. "Of Beren and Lúthien" |
| - | | 20. "Of the Fifth Battle: Nirnaeth Arnoediad" |
| 2. "Turambar and the Foalókë" | Eltas | 21. "Of Túrin Turambar" |
| 3. "The Fall of Gondolin" | Ilfinion | 23. "Of Tuor and the Fall of Gondolin" |
| 4. "The Nauglafring" | Ailios | 22. "Of the Ruin of Doriath" |
| 5. "The Tale of Eärendel"; — unwritten; 3 outlines and 4 poems only | - | 24. "Of the Voyage of Eärendil and the War of Wrath" |
| 6a. "The End of the Tales" — unwritten; 1 outline, 4 notes, epilogue only 6b. "The History of Eriol or Ælfwine" — unwritten; 2 outlines (based on 19 notes), 2 poems, 1 fragment only | - | (Frame story; see note to 'The Cottage of Lost Play' in Book I) |

=== Inscriptions ===
There is an inscription in the Fëanorian characters (Tengwar, an alphabet Tolkien devised for High-Elves) in the first pages of every History of Middle-earth volume, written by Christopher Tolkien and describing the contents of the book. The inscription in Book I reads "This is the first part of the Book of the Lost Tales of Elfinesse which Eriol the Mariner learned from the Elves of Tol Eressëa, the Lonely Isle in the western ocean, and afterwards wrote in the Golden Book of Tavrobel. Herein are told the Tales of Valinor, from the Music of the Ainur to the Exile of the Noldoli and the Hiding of Valinor."

The inscription in Book II reads "This is the second part of the Book of the Lost Tales of Elfinesse which Eriol the Mariner learned from the Elves of Tol Eressëa, the Lonely Isle in the western ocean, and afterwards wrote in the Golden Book of Tavrobel. Herein are told the Tales of Beren and Tinúviel, of Turambar, of the Fall of Gondolin and of the Necklace of the Dwarves."

== Reception ==
=== General ===
The science fiction author Colin Greenland reviewed The Book of Lost Tales I for Imagine magazine, and stated that "Those who prefer their fairy-tales sophisticated, in weighty prose with scholarly footnotes and appendices, will plunge joyously into J R R Tolkien's first Book of Lost Tales."

The science fiction critic Dave Langford reviewed The Book of Lost Tales II for White Dwarf #59, stating that he had mixed feelings about it, since while it provided some added depth, he was not sure that every detail was worth "annotating with such ghastly solemnity."

=== Scholarly ===
The Tolkien scholar Charles Noad, reviewing Part 1 in Mallorn in 1984, notes the mismatches between the names in the book and those in The Silmarillion, the many alternative names, and the varying attributes of the characters when the name remains unchanged. He likens the book's relationship to The Silmarillion to that of a charcoal sketch and the oil painting that it precedes: much work is evidently needed. Further, Tolkien's prose style is at this point still "immature and unsophisticated". Noad quotes Christopher Tolkien's remark that development was usually "by subtle transformation". He finds "very extraordinary" the revelation that the island that the wanderer Eriol sets foot on is what would become England. He notes, too, what he calls a major problem facing Tolkien: how "to present his mythology in the proper perspective", commenting that it was meant to be "a survival from the remotest antiquity". That, Noad writes, requires an indirect approach, which The Hobbit eventually provided: the legendarium became the distant past to the story in the foreground. He concludes that the book will be mainly of [literary] 'archaeological' interest "and cannot be recommended to the casual reader".

Noad, in his review of Part 2, comments that the reviewer's task faces the problem that the sort of comparisons a review would normally make have already all been made, in "abundant detail", by Christopher Tolkien in his commentary and notes. But it was still striking, he wrote, how Beren is here an Elf, not a Man; and Lúthien rescues him not from Sauron but from Tevildo, Prince of Cats. Noad finds it remarkable how much the story had changed, given that the tale of Lúthien and Beren was so important to Tolkien. Of the volume as a whole, Noad comments that it is less "cosmographic" than Part 1, but has a stronger narrative thread. All the same, he feels it is "more of use to the curious" or the researcher than a stand-alone work; he finds the writing "stilted", failing to achieve its intended effects. Evidently, he concludes, Tolkien did not acquire his finished prose style quickly or easily. Noad praises Christopher Tolkien's editing, setting out the complicated materials "astonishingly well".

The Tolkien scholar Vladimir Brljak, writing in Tolkien Studies in 2010, notes that Tolkien's comment in Beowulf: The Monsters and the Critics, that Beowulf was already antiquarian when written, and is now "an echo of an echo", bringing poignant vistas of sad times long gone by, was also a defence of his own writings, where he followed the Beowulf poet in deliberately seeking to create an impression of depth. He did this in the two Books of Lost Tales by creating "an intricate metafictional structure", embedding his works in a framework of "translations of redactions of ancient works, telling of things even more ancient." Brljak argues that this framework is "both the cornerstone and crowning achievement of Tolkien's mature literary work."

== See also ==
- Unfinished Tales (1980)
- The Children of Húrin (2007)

== Sources ==
- Tolkien, J. R. R. (1984). Christopher Tolkien (ed.). The Book of Lost Tales. Vol. 1. Boston: Houghton Mifflin. ISBN 0-395-35439-0.
