= Impression of depth in The Lord of the Rings =

Literary device in Tolkien's fiction

The impression of depth in The Lord of the Rings is an aesthetic effect deliberately sought by its author, J. R. R. Tolkien. It was intended to give the reader the feeling that the work had "deep roots in the past", and hence that it was attractively authentic.

The effect was constructed on at least four factors, namely the enormous scale of The Lord of the Rings and the amount of background detail, including maps and genealogies; the apparently casual and incomplete mentions of this background; multiple inconsistent accounts, as in real history; and writing different texts in varying styles.

Scholars have noted some of Tolkien's medieval antecedents in the effect, such as Beowulf and Sir Gawain and the Green Knight. Fantasy authors such as Ursula K. Le Guin and J. K. Rowling have to an extent followed Tolkien in using the technique.

== Effect ==
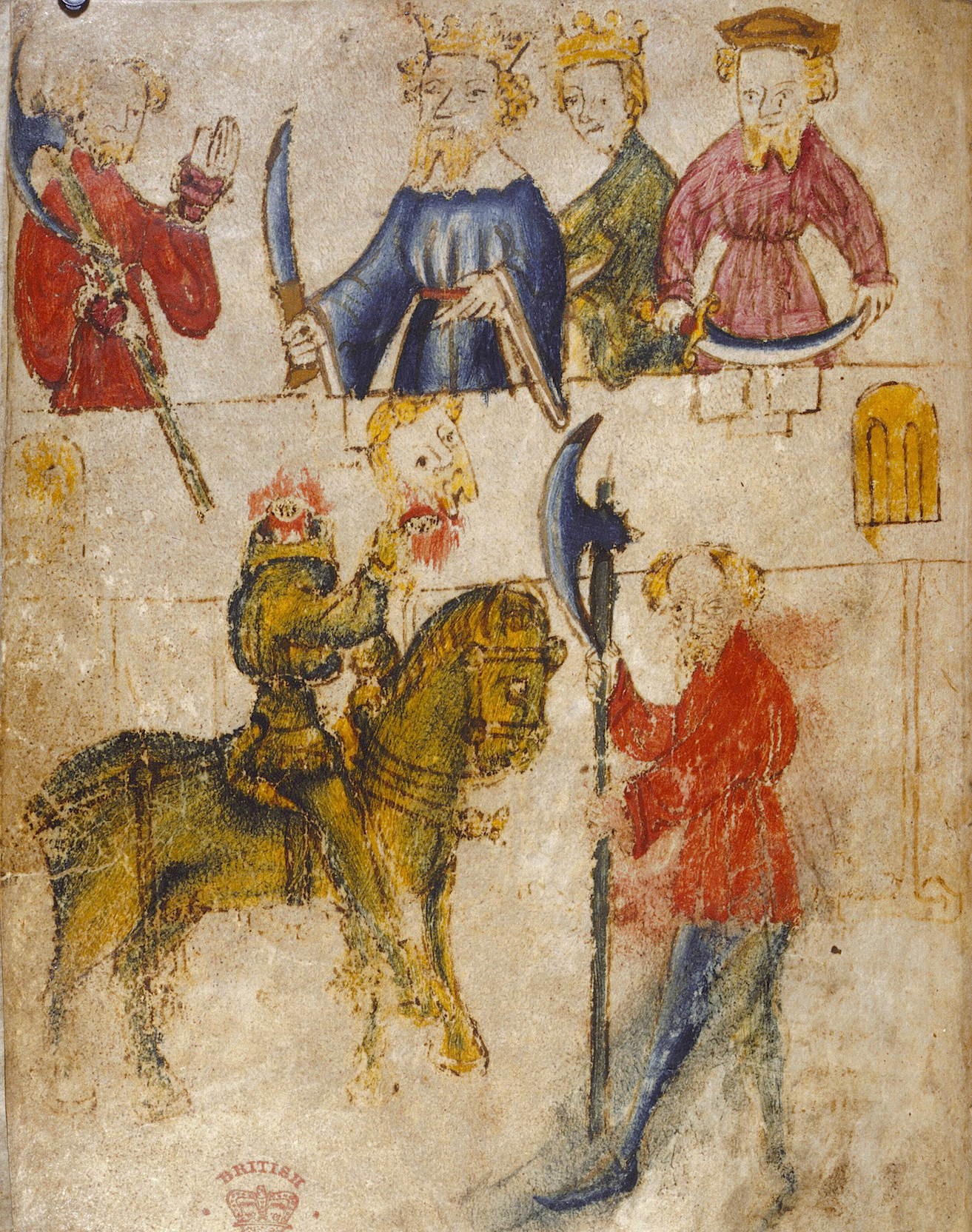
Tolkien admired the impression of depth in Sir Gawain and the Green Knight. (Note: Tolkien 1983, p. 72, "Sir Gawain and the Green Knight") Illustration from the medieval manuscript

In an essay, Tolkien praised the 14th-century English chivalric romance Sir Gawain and the Green Knight for its "deep roots in the past, deeper even than its author was aware". In his opinion, this enabled it to survive even the severe test of being a set text for students; it deserved "close and detailed attention, and after that ... careful consideration, and re-consideration". In an aside, he went on to discuss what that meant:

It is an interesting question: what is this flavour, this atmosphere, this virtue that such rooted works have, and which compensates for the inevitable flaws and imperfect adjustments that must appear, when plots, motives, symbols, are rehandled and pressed into the service of the changed minds of a later time, used for the expression of ideas quite different from those which produced them.

In a letter, Tolkien provided at least part of his own view of the impression of depth in The Lord of the Rings, namely that (Note: Carpenter 2023, Letter #247 to Colonel Worskett, 20 September 1963)

Part of the attraction of the L.R. is, I think, due to the glimpses of a large history in the background: an attraction like that of viewing far off an unvisited island, or seeing the towers of a distant city gleaming in a sunlit mist.

Tolkien noted further that this effect would be difficult to attain in the legendarium that lay behind The Lord of the Rings, "unless new unattainable vistas are again revealed". He added that "many of the older legends are purely 'mythological', and nearly all are grim and tragic".

The scholar of English literature Katarzyna Ferdynus comments that

the pseudo-mediaeval reality of The Lord of the Rings is full of dim echoes of the ancient past, the old glorious days remembered and praised by many of the inhabitants ... the Fellowship constantly encounters the relics of the past, as they travel through long–forgotten countries, the ruins of old cities, fortresses and watchtowers, forests and rivers that once witnessed important historical events. In their dialogues they constantly refer to legends, they sing or recite old ballads and poems, and they narrate stories whenever there is an opportunity. 'As night f[alls] and the light of the fire beg[ins] to shine out brightly' they listen to the 'histories and legends of long ago, of Elves and Men and the good and evil deeds of the Elder Days'. (Note: Tolkien 1954a, book 1, ch. 11 "A Knife in the Dark") Those numerous references create the striking impression of the depth of time".

Tom Shippey, a Tolkien scholar, writes that depth is "the one literary quality, to say no more, which most certainly distinguishes Tolkien from his many imitators" in fantasy, and that behind the visible text lay "a coherent, consistent, deeply fascinating world about which he had no time [then] to speak".

== Precedents ==
This quality of depth, that Tolkien valued highly, he found especially in Beowulf, but also in other works that he admired, such as Virgil's Aeneid, Shakespeare's Macbeth, Sir Orfeo, and Grimms' Fairy Tales. Scholars such as Gergely Nagy have identified other texts well known to Tolkien that provide a strong impression of depth, including Thomas Malory's Le Morte d'Arthur and Geoffrey Chaucer's Troilus and Criseyde. Beowulf contains numerous digressions into other stories which have functions other than advancing the story, in Adrien Bonjour's words rendering "the background of the poem extraordinarily alive", (Note: Nagy cites Bonjour, Adrien (1950). The Digressions in 'Beowulf'. Basil Blackwell.) and providing contrasts and examples that repeatedly illuminate the key points of the main story. Tolkien stated in The Monsters and the Critics that Beowulf (Note: Tolkien 1983, p. 27, "The Monsters and the Critics")

must have succeeded admirably in creating in the minds of the poet's contemporaries the illusion of surveying a past, pagan but noble and fraught with a deep significance - a past that itself had depth and reached backward into a dark antiquity of sorrow. This impression of depth is an effect and a justification of the use of episodes and allusions to old tales, mostly darker, more pagan, and desperate than the foreground".

== Factors ==
Scholars have identified four factors that help to build the impression of depth:

1. the enormous scale and detail of Tolkien's Middle-earth background
2. the apparently casual and incomplete mentions of this background in the text, as if it were something taken for granted
3. the multiple accounts, containing gaps and inconsistencies, as if it were a real body of historical documents
4. the multiple styles in which the various texts are written, as if by different hands.

=== Vast backcloths ===
The backdrop to The Lord of the Rings encompassed cosmological myths on a grand scale.

Tolkien alluded to the first factor with the phrase "vast backcloths": (Note: Carpenter 2023, Letter #131 to Milton Waldman, late in 1951)

once upon a time I had a mind to make a body of more or less connected legend, ranging from the large and cosmogonic, to the level of romantic fairy-story—the larger founded on the lesser in contact with the earth, the lesser drawing splendour from the vast backcloths—which I could dedicate simply to: to England; to my country.

The Tolkien scholar Michael Drout, with colleagues, notes that the vastness was not an exaggeration, given that it encompassed The Silmarillion and much of the multi-volume legendarium edited by Tolkien's son Christopher, not to mention the many "further drafts, partially edited copies, riders, cancelled pages, and even lost texts" behind even those lengthy works. Shippey adds that Tolkien's maps, too, lend an "air of solidity and extent" to the work, providing "repeated implicit assurances of the existence of the things they label, and of course of their nature and history too".

=== Casual mentions ===
I remember well the splendour of their banners ... It recalled to me the glory of the Elder Days and the hosts of Beleriand, so many great princes and captains were assembled. And yet not so many, nor so fair, as when Thangorodrim was broken...

— Elrond alluding to the War of Wrath at the end of the First Age, and the Last Alliance of Elves and Men in the Second Age, at "The Council of Elrond" (Note: Tolkien 1954a, book 2, ch. 2 "The Council of Elrond")

Mentions of background stories and events in The Lord of the Rings take many forms. These include songs and poems interspersed in the text, such as of Beren and Lúthien sung by Aragorn; mentions of objects like the prized Silmarils, by the Hobbit Sam Gamgee; and people from past ages like the Elven-smith Celebrimbor, described by the Elf-lord Elrond. All these mentions made use of existing but at the time unpublished texts. Similarly, the lady of Rohan, Éowyn, does not just give Merry Brandybuck a horn; she gives him an ancient silver horn "from the Hoard of Scatha the Worm". The mentions give the reader the feeling that Middle-earth is far larger than the parts described in the story, and that it had "a deep history" much older than the War of the Ring.

Nagy analyses the effect of such mentions in the case of Sam's fight with the giant spider Shelob during his and Frodo's dangerous struggle to enter the Dark Lord Sauron's evil land of Mordor. Sam desperately slashes at Shelob's underside after she has stung Frodo:

The blade scored it with a dreadful gash, but those hideous folds could not be pierced by any strength of men, not though Elf or Dwarf should forge the steel or the hand of Beren or of Túrin wield it. (Note: Tolkien 1954, book 4, ch. 10, "The Choices of Master Samwise")

The invocation of the First Age hero Túrin Turambar, Nagy writes, "becomes a reflection of Túrin slaying Glaurung" the dragon. He states that Glaurung's allegiance to the original Dark Lord, Morgoth, reinforces the link with evil already suggested by the descent of Shelob from the first and greatest of all the evil giant spiders, Ungoliant, who destroyed the Two Trees of Valinor in The Silmarillion, (Note: Tolkien 1977, "Quenta Silmarillion", ch. 8 "Of the Darkening of Valinor") and that Túrin's feud with the dragon is mirrored by Sam's feud with the spider, begun by its attack on Sam's master, Frodo. Nagy comments that "the dimension of the scene is [thus] greatly increased".

Gergely Nagy's analysis of depth in Sam's fight with Shelob
	Surface	Depth via Ungoliant backstory	Depth via Túrin backstory
Story	Sam fights Shelob		
Mentions		"But none could rival her, Shelob the Great, last child of Ungoliant to trouble the unhappy world" (Note: Tolkien 1954, book 4, ch. 9, "Shelob's Lair")	"those hideous folds could not be pierced by any strength of men, not though Elf or Dwarf should forge the steel or the hand of Beren or of Túrin wield it"
Protagonist	Sam		Túrin
Antagonist	Shelob the giant spider	Ungoliant the first giant spider	Glaurung the dragon
Link with evil	The Dark Lord Sauron's tacit acceptance of Shelob as an unwitting gatekeeper	Ungoliant's service to the fallen Vala Melkor, who became Morgoth	Glaurung's allegiance to the first Dark Lord, Morgoth
Feud	Sam avenges Shelob's attack on Frodo	Ungoliant hates all light, destroys the Two Trees of Valinor that shine silver and gold (Note: A further deep connection here is that the light of the Two Trees is contained in the Phial of Galadriel that Frodo and Sam use in the battle with Shelob.)	Túrin ends his long feud with Glaurung

=== Multiple accounts, apparent contradictions ===
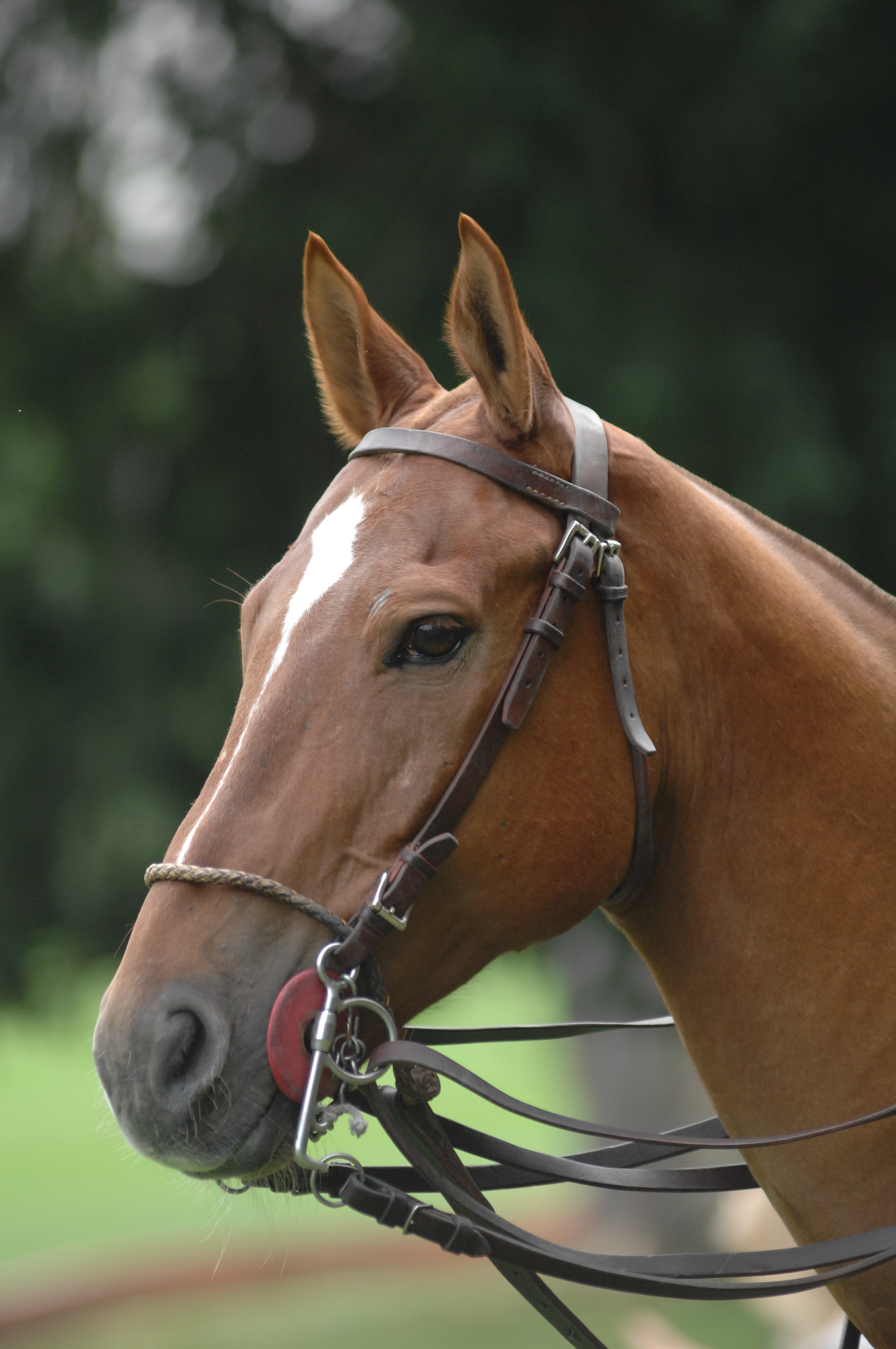
Apparent contradiction: Tolkien stated that Elves rode without saddle or harness of any kind, but gives Glorfindel's horse both bit and bridle (modern bit and bridle shown).

Scholars such as Peri Sipahi note that the use of multiple accounts is introduced in the Prologue to The Lord of the Rings, where the narrator explains that "many of their traditions, up to that time still mainly oral, were collected and written down", (Note: Tolkien 1954a, "Prologue", "Note on the Shire Records") and then details the various copies, redactions, and translations that were made of the fictive Red Book of Westmarch. Beowulf is similarly written as if its audience knew of the historic characters already. The Poetic Edda is a compilation of numerous older sources.

Apparent contradictions, Drout notes, tend to give readers the impression of a real and complex history, since they may assume that an omniscient author can make a fictional story wholly consistent. Among the examples he gives are that Tolkien stated that Elves rode without either a saddle or a harness, but the Elf-lord Glorfindel's horse is described as having both bit and bridle, and Glorfindel says he will shorten his horse's stirrups for the Hobbit Frodo. (Note: Tolkien 1954a, book 1, ch. 12 "Flight to the Ford") (Note: In a letter written after the publication of The Lord of the Rings, Tolkien writes that "actually bridle was casually and carelessly used for what I suppose should have been called a headstall... Glorfindel's horse would have an ornamental headstall, carrying a plume, and with the straps studded with jewels and small bells; but Glor[findel] would certainly not use a bit. I will change bridle and bit to headstall." (Note: Carpenter 2023, letter 211 to Rhona Beare, 14 October 1958)) In another case, Tolkien intentionally did not edit away the contradiction between Tom Bombadil's claim that he was "Eldest ... here before the river and the trees; Tom remembers the first raindrop and the first acorn", (Note: Tolkien 1954a, book 1, ch. 7 "In the House of Tom Bombadil") and Gandalf's description of the Ent Treebeard that "Treebeard is Fangorn, the guardian of the forest; he is the oldest of the Ents, the oldest living thing that still walks beneath the Sun upon this Middle-earth". (Note: Tolkien 1954, book 3, ch. 5, "The White Rider")

=== Varying styles ===
The characters from each part of Middle-earth speak and act in a way that is characteristic of that place, as with the Rohirrim. Sipahi notes, too, that all four factors tend to occur together, again as seen in the account of the Rohirrim. In addition, their language and names—all taken from Old English—lend further depth by linking back to the medieval period in the real primary world.

== Reception ==
The critic and experimental novelist Christine Brooke-Rose attacked "the histories and genealogies" as not "in the least necessary to the narrative", thus demonstrating in Shippey's view her ignorance of Tolkien's creation of depth. He notes that she guessed wrongly that Tolkien would have translated all the "runic and other messages inside the narrative", as, he suggests, almost all other authors would have done, but that Tolkien did not, as he saw a value in the sound of untranslated language.

Later fantasy authors such as Ursula K. Le Guin made use of the device of giving pseudo-references to create depth; in the Earthsea novels, she alluded to tales of Elfarran, Morred, and the Firelord, which she wrote many years later. The scholar Katherine Sas writes that J. K. Rowling scaled down Tolkien's impression of depth but applied all four factors involved to her book Harry Potter and the Prisoner of Azkaban.

== See also ==
- Non-narrative elements in The Lord of the Rings
