= Melian (Middle-earth) =

Fictional character created by J. R. R. Tolkien

- Tolkien character

In-universe information
- Aliases: Queen of Doriath, Queen of the Sindar, Queen of the Teleri, Queen of Beleriand
- Race: Maia
- Book(s): The Silmarillion; The History of Middle-earth; The Children of Húrin; Beren & Lúthien

Melian is a fictional character in J.R.R. Tolkien's Middle-earth legendarium. She appears in The Silmarillion, The Children of Húrin, Beren and Lúthien, and in several stories within The History of Middle-earth series. An early version of Melian is found in The Book of Lost Tales II, part of The History of Middle-earth, where her characterization differs significantly. The final version of the character is presented as a Maia, a lesser class of powerful divine beings in Tolkien's legendarium known as the Ainur, who takes the form of an Elf and becomes the loyal queen consort of Elu Thingol.

Melian is an important character in the First Age of Middle-earth, and an essential part of the ancestral backgrounding of the interracial romances between her daughter Lúthien and the mortal Man Beren, as well as that of her descendants Aragorn and Arwen. Commentators have analysed the character's mystical nature, as well as her role as a forerunner of the Elf-queen Galadriel in The Lord of the Rings.

== Fictional biography ==
Melian counsels Thingol

Now Melian had much foresight, after the manner of the Maiar; and when the second age of the captivity of Melkor had passed, she counselled Thingol that the Peace of Arda would not last for ever. He took thought therefore how he should make for himself a kingly dwelling, and a place that should be strong, if evil were to awake again in Middle-earth; and he sought aid and counsel of the Dwarves of Belegost. They gave it willingly, for they were unwearied in those days and eager for new works; and though the Dwarves ever demanded a price for all that they did, whether with delight or with toil, at this time they held themselves paid. (Note: Tolkien 1977 ch. 10 "Of the Sindar")

Melian is an angelic being, a Maia close to the godlike Valië, the Queen of the Earth, Yavanna. She originally tended fruit trees in the gardens of Lórien and served the Valier Estë and Vána prior to her departure for Middle-earth. She is defined by her beauty, her connection to the natural world, her gifts of foresight and wisdom, and especially her "angelic and haunting singing". (Note: Tolkien 1977, ch. 4 "Of Thingol and Melian") It is said that she arrives in Middle-earth to teach its birds to sing, and dwells in the forest of Nan Elmoth, to the east of Doriath in Beleriand. Because she is from Valinor, her face carries the strength and splendour of the light of Valinor when she arrives in Middle-earth, much like the Noldor who had seen the light of the Two Trees. In Nan Elmoth, she meets her future husband, the Elf Prince Elwë, while she is singing with the nightingales one day. It was then that Elwë, being "filled with love" for Melian, falls under an enchantment and utterly forgets his people the Sindar, wishing instead to spend the rest of his years with her. Taking the form of an elf and thus subjecting herself to the limits of physical embodiment, Melian spends many years in solitude with Elwë, who is thought lost to his people in Nan Elmoth until the couple re-emerge into Middle-earth society.

Melian and her husband, now known as Elu Thingol, settle in Beleriand, and establish a realm called Doriath, which they rule over as its monarchs. Their only daughter, Lúthien, is the most beautiful person who ever lived in Middle-earth. Weaving "much magic and mystery" around Thingol's halls, Melian uses her vast powers to shroud Doriath in an impenetrable, invisible barrier known as the Girdle of Melian to protect them from Morgoth's forces. It prevents anyone from entering without her or Thingol's permission, bewildering and confusing travellers and wanderers, or driving them mad. (Note: Tolkien 1977 ch. 14 "Of Beleriand and its Realms") The Girdle of Melian proves to be stronger than any power except unselfish love as the mortal Man Beren, who falls in love with her daughter, manages to overcome it. As a divine being in Tolkien's legendarium, Melian's bloodline which is carried on from the marriage between Beren and Lúthien represents "a strain of the Ainur who were with Ilúvatar before Eä": her descendants include Elwing, Elrond, Arwen, Elendil, and Aragorn.

Said to be wiser than "any child of Middle-Earth", Melian is known for her insights into the future, though her counsel is repeatedly left unheeded. In The Children of Húrin, Melian is depicted as trying in vain to "avert the evil that was prepared in the thought of Morgoth": she attempts to convince Morwen against leaving the safety of Doriath, advises Túrin on the best course of action, and warns Beleg not to take up Anglachel, a cursed blade forged by the Dark Elf Eöl. She does convince Húrin to come to terms with his grief over the tragic fate of his family, after he goes on a violent rampage fuelled by rage and bitterness. Thingol himself seldom heeds her advice or warnings; this leads to disaster when his greed for the Silmaril retrieved from Morgoth's crown triggers a series of events which culminates in his own death and the fall of Doriath. Following Thingol's passing, she confers with Lúthien and Beren one final time, before returning to Valinor on her own.

== Creation and conception ==
The name "Melian" means Beloved in Tolkien's constructed language of Sindarin. In Quenya, another of Tolkien's languages, her name is "Melyanna", signifying "Dear Gift" or "Gift of Love" (Q. melya, "dear, lovely" < Q. mel-, "love"; Q. anna, "gift"). (Note: Tolkien 1987 "The Etymologies")

Tolkien had given Melian other names throughout the development process of his legendarium. She appears in The Book of Lost Tales Part One as Tindriel or Wendelin in Quenya, and in a Gnomish dictionary as Gwendeling or Gwendhiling. (Note: Tolkien 1984 Part I, entry "Wendelin") Within the story of The Book of Lost Tales, Vëannë and Ausir argued whether she should be called Wendelin or Gwendeling. These names were reintroduced into the 2017 book Beren and Lúthien, an extended story about the tale of Lúthien and Beren.

Tolkien defined Melian as a fay in earlier drafts of his work, and she was written as a somewhat sinister character. This version of the character appears in "The Tale of Tinúviel", Tolkien's first story about Beren and Lúthien, which was written in archaic English and published in The Book of Lost Tales Part Two. (Note: Tolkien 1984b Part 2 "The Tale of Tinúviel") In one variant of her backstory, she is a daughter of the Vala Irmo, also known as Lórien. She is discovered by Tinwelint, a precursor of Thingol, while listening to the song of nightingales; when he tried to touch her hair, she ran away laughing, after which he fell into a deep slumber and she kept watch over him while he slept. She later became his wife and the queen of Artanor, and together they have a son, Tinfang, and a daughter, Tinúviel. She appears in another later narrative within the same publication, although her character is portrayed as being far weaker and more frail. Christopher Tolkien noted that in this early version, the Girdle of Melian is sufficiently weaker in power that it is possible for Morgoth's forces to follow Beren and Tinúviel all the way back to Doriath.

== Analysis ==
=== Female authority figure ===
"What strikes me about the story of Melian is that she gives up the splendor, joy, and privilege of eternal life in Valinor to dwell in the middle-world, a world of shadows as well as light, out of a vast, unreasonable, powerful love. Thus does Melian the Maia, in her willing sacrifice, become the foremother of some of the most powerful, redeeming figures in Middle-earth's long, scarred history."
— Megan N. Fontenot, Exploring the People of Middle-earth: Melian, Divine Enchantress and Deathless Queen

In an article for Tor.com's bi-weekly series on "Exploring the People of Middle-earth", Megan N. Fontenot said that she admires how Melian's strength and wisdom is characterised, as well as her discreet nature and foresight to choose the appropriate time to speak, or to listen and observe. For Fontenot, Melian's backstory and nature represent "an important metaphor in Tolkien for one's ability to remain hopeful even in the most dire and desperate of circumstances", as she is accompanied by nightingales, birds that sing in the darkness, demonstrating that the ability "to enjoy and appreciate even the shadows brought other joy and beauty to Middle-earth".

Writing in Mythlore about female authority figures in fiction, Lisa Hopkins argued that "power in the works of Tolkien is often to be found in the hands of a woman", and that in Melian's case "the role of woman as mother as well as wife is markedly stressed". For Hopkins, Melian's marriage with Thingol is parallel to the marriage between Elves and mortal Men, where the wives are always of Elven heritage, and considerable status is attributed to these women within their marriages. She noted the Girdle of Melian is capable of repelling even the power of Morgoth himself, "providing a considerably more potent protection than any which could have been afforded by her husband Thingol".

=== Marriage to Thingol ===
Melian's association with Thingol, as well as the continuation of her divine bloodline through the Half-elven and the royal bloodline of the Dúnedain, is considered to be an important element within Tolkien's legendarium. The scholar Cathy Akers-Jordan noted that as an Elf and thus "the lesser race", Thingol is ennobled by his marriage to Melian the Maia, "a greater race". Commentators noted that Lúthien's power is derived from her inheritance of at least some of her mother's might. Fontenot suggested that it is partially due to Melian's influence or standing with her Ainur brethren that Lúthien was given an audience with Mandos, and that her plea to have Beren returned to life was ultimately granted. Hopkins in particular highlighted Lúthien as an equal to Beren and suggested that he "would undoubtedly never have survived his quest without her help".

Melian's decision to take "upon herself the form of the Elder Children of Iluvatar" out of love for Thingol represents a more fatal version of the adoption of form by the Ainur, as "in that union she became bound by the chain and trammels of the flesh of Arda". Writing in Mythlore, Robley Evans explained that Tolkien represents creation through music, "the art of time, with its potential for modulation". He drew attention to Tolkien's explanation that The Ainur "are shown visions but not their fulfillment, darkness but not its meaning. They participate in the divine music without knowing its purposes, and give form without knowing consequences, so that creativity, by analogy, will always be ambiguous in its delimiting power". Thus, Melian assumes the form of Elf based on her "knowledge of the visible World, rather than of the World itself".

=== Shielding her realm, like Galadriel ===
Several commentators have discussed the relationship between Melian and Galadriel at length. The scholar of English literature Marjorie Burns describes Melian as "the most traditional enchantress in Tolkien's literature", comparing her Celtic nature to that of Galadriel. Burns observed that unlike Galadriel, Melian is overtly sexual, with her clothes "'filmy' and "most lovely", and her singing and dancing is like 'strong wine'" to Thingol, who is bewitched by her. Commentators agreed that Galadriel's protective shield around her realm generated through the power of the Ring of Nenya is directly inspired by the Girdle of Melian; Evans in particular considered it a "lovely but pale reflection". Jeff LaSala and Megan N. Fontenot from Tor.com agree that Melian's close relationship with Galadriel as depicted in The Silmarillion provided much context for how Galadriel is characterized and presented in The Lord of the Rings. The depiction of Melian distributing lembas bread is noted as a particularly significant act within the legendarium; Fontenot suggested that Galadriel "consciously mirrored it" when she gives lembas to the Fellowship in The Fellowship of the Ring; The Catholic World Report compared it to the Eucharist.

Melian is somewhat Homeric in opposing Ungoliant, the monstrous spider of darkness in The Silmarillion, just as Galadriel opposes Ungoliant's spawn Shelob in The Lord of the Rings. Mac Fenwick noted that while Melian is no longer present in Middle-earth by the Third Age, Galadriel continues her legacy, just as Sauron and Shelob continue the thematic positions of their predecessors Morgoth and Ungoliant.

=== Comparisons with other characters ===
"The moral of the story, one that clearly resonates down through the legendarium in an unbroken line from The Story of Kullervo through Turambar and the Foalókë and The Children of Húrin, potent enough to find its way into The Tale of Tinúviel and all its antecedents, is that when the Lady of the Forest tells you to stick to the path, whether it be physical or metaphorical, you best listen. Nothing less than your very fate hangs in the balance."
— Kristine Larsen, Ladies of the Forest: Melian and Mielikki

Ivana Šarić contrasted Melian with Gandalf, another Maia character whom she considers equal to Melian in power and wisdom. She commented that unlike the Wizard she is absent as an active agent in Tolkien's stories, as she is primarily bound to Middle-earth out of love for Thingol, and remains largely passive due to her primary characterization as his wife. Šarić noted that the absence of any masculine qualities in her appearance, described by Tolkien as exceedingly beautiful, is a signal of Melian's more subservient nature, as she maintains a strictly defensive position with her Girdle over Doriath and is never shown as having a desire for power.

In an article published by Central Connecticut State University, Kristine Larsen contended that Melian was recycled from another character in the Kalevala. Larsen compared her to the Finnish goddess Mielikki in The Story of Kullervo, which played a central role in Tolkien's first attempts to compose original mythology. Verlyn Flieger, the editor of The Story of Kullervo, identifies its "blue-robed Lady of the Forest" character as Mielikki. Larsen associates the blue robes with Melian's magical powers of enchantment as well as the gift of foresight, a reflection of what Flieger terms Tolkien's "long preoccupation with the nature of magic and the supernatural". Larsen noted that when Tolkien expanded and revised the tale of Beren and Lúthien over the years, he also emphasized the role of Melian as a sage "who pronounces dooms and whose advice is ignored only at significant risk", as well as the tragic consequences suffered by the characters who do not heed her advice. Lisa Coutras noted that Thingol's reckless actions and refusal to heed Melian's counsel about the Silmarils brought about the downfall of his kingdom.

Fontenot makes some comparisons with classical figures, too. She describes Melian as "the Orpheus of Arda", since, much like the lyre-playing musician of Greek myth, "Her voice is so beautiful that all of paradise leaves off its normal activities just to listen to her." Further, she likens Melian to Cassandra, the prophetess of Troy who makes accurate predictions of trouble to come, but is ignored all the same.

== Genealogy ==
Half-elven family tree (Note: Tolkien 1977, "Of the Rings of Power and the Third Age": Family Trees I and II: "The house of Finwë and the Noldorin descent of Elrond and Elros", and "The descendants of Olwë and Elwë") (Note: Tolkien 1955, Appendix A: Annals of the Kings and Rulers, I The Númenórean Kings)

Melian the Maia	Thingol of the Teleri	House of Bëor	House of Haleth	House of Hador	Finwë of the Noldor	Indis of the Vanyar	Olwë of the Teleri
Barahir	Belegund	Hareth	Galdor	Fingolfin	Finarfin	Eärwen
Lúthien	Beren	Rían	Huor	Húrin	Turgon	Elenwë
Dior	Nimloth	Tuor	Idril
Eluréd	Elurín	Elwing	Eärendil	Celeborn	Galadriel
Elros	Elrond	Celebrían
22 Kings of Númenor and Lords of Andúnië
Elendil
Isildur	Anárion
22 Kings of Arnor and Arthedain	27 Kings of Gondor
Arvedui	Fíriel
15 Dúnedain; Chieftains
Aragorn	Arwen	Elladan	Elrohir
Eldarion	daughters

Colour key:
Colour	Description
	Elves
	Men
	Maiar
	Half-elven
	Half-elven who chose the fate of Elves
	Half-elven who chose the fate of mortal Men
