= Túrin Turambar =

Fictional character from Middle-earth

Túrin
- Tolkien character

In-universe information
- Race: Men
- Book(s): The Silmarillion, Unfinished Tales; The Book of Lost Tales Part II; The Lays of Beleriand; The War of the Jewels; The Children of Húrin

Túrin Turambar (pronounced [ˈtuːrɪn tuˈrambar]) is a fictional character in J. R. R. Tolkien's legendarium. Turambar and the Foalókë, begun in 1917, is the first appearance of Túrin in the legendarium. Túrin is a Man of the First Age of Middle-earth, whose family had been cursed by the Dark Lord Morgoth. While trying vainly to defy the curse, Túrin brings ruin across much of Beleriand, and upon himself and his sister Niënor. His title, "Turambar", means master of fate.

Tolkien consciously based the story on the tale of Kullervo in the 19th-century Finnish mythological poem Kalevala. Scholars have noted parallels with other myths including that of Sigmund and Sigurd in the Völsunga saga of Norse mythology; with the Greek myth of Oedipus; and in terms of structure and style, with Arthurian legend.

Excerpts have been published in prose in The Silmarillion, Unfinished Tales, The Book of Lost Tales Part II, and The War of the Jewels, and in alliterative long-line verse in The Lays of Beleriand. The complete story was published as The Children of Húrin in 2007.

== Publication history ==
Tolkien wrote multiple versions of the tale of Túrin. (Note: Tolkien 1993, "Myths Transformed" (I), p. 373 and note 2) These were published after his death, edited by his son Christopher Tolkien, as follows:

Published versions of the tale of Túrin
Date	Book	Section	Type	Notes
1977	The Silmarillion	"Of Túrin Turambar"	Prose	Chapter; omits what would have been a short summary of the story's conclusion, "The Wanderings of Húrin" as Christopher Tolkien judged it too complex
1980	Unfinished Tales	"Narn i Chîn Húrin" ("Tale of the Children of Húrin")	Prose	Known as the "Narn"; c. 90 pages, prose, written c. 1917
1984	The Book of Lost Tales Part II	"Turambar and the Foalókë"	Prose	c. 45 pages, with 28 pages of commentary. This was the first version of the Túrin story, written c. 1917
1985	The Lays of Beleriand	"The Lay of the Children of Húrin"	Poetry	2276 lines of long-line alliterative verse, composed c. 1925 in Leeds
1994	The War of the Jewels	"The Wanderings of Húrin"	Prose	Continues the "Narn"
2007	The Children of Húrin	(whole book)	Prose	Complete, book-length; drafted from 1910, revised repeatedly, not finished in Tolkien's lifetime

== Narrative ==
=== Dor-lómin ===
Túrin is the son of Húrin, Lord of the Folk of Hador, and Morwen of the House of Bëor. (Note: Tolkien 2007 "The Childhood of Túrin") The Siege of Angband has been broken, but Túrin's homeland of Dor-lómin in the northwest of Beleriand is still contested by Húrin against the Dark Lord Morgoth's forces. When Túrin is eight, Húrin leads his Men to war; all are killed in the Battle of Unnumbered Tears. Húrin is captured and cursed by Morgoth, who sends an army of Easterlings to Dor-lómin. Túrin remains with Morwen, who hides him and sends him secretly to the hidden Elven-realm of Doriath; Morwen remains in Dor-lómin, and shortly afterwards gives birth to a girl, Niënor. (Note: Tolkien 1977, ch. 22 "Of Túrin Turambar") (Note: Tolkien 1994 "The Wanderings of Húrin", pp. 256–257 (a plot-synopsis for the Narn))

=== Doriath ===
Túrin reaches Doriath, which is protected by an enchantment, the Girdle of Melian. The marchwarden Beleg leads them to the city of Menegroth, where King Thingol adopts Túrin, in memory of Húrin's heroism. The Elven-lady Nellas watches over Túrin at Melian's bidding, teaching him Elven-lore. Túrin becomes esteemed for his prowess, and Beleg teaches him warfare. When after some years Dor-lómin is cut off and news from Morwen and Niënor ceases to arrive, Túrin decides to pit his strength against Morgoth's forces, hoping to avenge the sorrows of his kin. Thingol appoints him a "knight of the sword". (Note: Tolkien 2007 "Túrin in Doriath") Túrin departs to fight the Orcs in the north of Doriath, where he is joined by Beleg. His chief weapon is the sword, and he wears the Dragon-helm of Hador, so that the Orcs fear him. At the age of 20, (Note: Tolkien 1994 The Grey Annals, pp. 61–103, 129–165.) Túrin accidentally kills Saeros, one of Thingol's counsellors, who had insulted him. Ignoring advice, he flees from Doriath, fearing imprisonment. Thingol pardons Túrin, and Beleg obtains leave to seek out his friend.

=== Amon Rûdh ===
Túrin, unaware of this, flees westward, joining a band of outlaws in Gaurwaith and becomes its leader by accidentally killing their captain. (Note: Tolkien 2007 "Túrin among the Outlaws".) Beleg finds the band in the wild, but Túrin rejects Beleg's advice to return to Doriath. Túrin's band captures Mîm the Petty-dwarf. To save his life, Mîm shares his dwellings on the hill of Amon Rûdh with the band. Beleg returns to Túrin, bringing the Dragon-helm. The "Two Captains" free much of West Beleriand from evil, but the Dragon-helm reveals Túrin's identity to Morgoth, who attacks Amon Rûdh. The Orcs find Mîm, and he buys his life by leading them up the hill. Túrin is captured and all his men killed; Beleg escapes. (Note: Tolkien 1994, "Ælfwine and Dírhaval", pp. 311–315) Beleg follows the Orcs through the forest of Taur-nu-Fuin, and meets Gwindor, an escaped slave from Angband. Together they rescue Túrin in Anfauglith. Unfortunately, while Beleg is cutting the sleeping Túrin free from his bonds, he pricks Túrin's foot with the black sword Anglachel. Túrin, mistaking him in the darkness for an Orc, takes the sword and kills Beleg. Gwindor leads the grief-stricken Túrin to the Pools of Ivrin, where he returns to his senses.

=== Nargothrond ===
They journey to the hidden fortress of Nargothrond, where Gwindor had been a lord. He gives Beleg's sword Anglachel to Túrin, who has it reforged and renamed Gurthang, "Iron of Death". Túrin hides his own name, becoming known as Mormegil or the Blacksword of Nargothrond. Gwindor meets his beloved, Finduilas daughter of King Orodreth, but she unwillingly falls in love with Túrin; Túrin does not perceive this and holds her in awe. Túrin becomes a chief counsellor to the King. He encourages the Elves to abandon their secrecy, and they build a great bridge before the Doors of Nargothrond and clear the land between the River Sirion and the coastal Falas from enemies. Túrin becomes arrogant, ignoring even a warning from the godlike Vala Ulmo to destroy the bridge and return to secrecy.

After five years, Morgoth sends a great host of Orcs led by the dragon Glaurung. Túrin persuades Orodreth to fight them in the open. In the ensuing Battle of Tumhalad, Nargothrond's forces are destroyed and Orodreth is killed; the bridge helps Morgoth's forces to locate the fortress and cross the river Narog. Túrin fights Glaurung off, but leaves the battle to carry away the mortally wounded Gwindor. Before Gwindor dies, he instructs Túrin to save Finduilas, prophesying that she alone can avert Túrin's doom. Hastening to save the captives, Túrin is caught by Glaurung's powerful gaze. He stands by enspelled as Finduilas is dragged away, calling to him. The dragon deceives him into believing that Morwen and Niënor are suffering in Dor-lómin; Túrin abandons Finduilas to seek out his kin. When he reaches Dor-lómin, he finds that Morwen had already left for Doriath before the fall of Nargothrond. In his rage he kills the people around him.

=== Brethil ===
Túrin next tries to find Finduilas, travelling to the forest of Brethil, but is too late: the woodmen inform him that she had been killed by the Orcs when the Men of Brethil tried to rescue her. Túrin collapses in grief upon her grave, and is brought to a village in the forest, Ephel Brandir. There he takes up his life again, now calling himself Turambar ("Master of Doom") and renouncing his descent, hoping to overcome his curse. The Folk of Haleth dwelling there are ruled by Brandir the Lame, who hopes to preserve his people by secrecy. Turambar quickly gains power, gathering companies to fight Orcs. He stops wielding Gurthang and fights using a spear and a bow.

When Morwen and Niënor hear the news of Nargothrond's destruction, they rashly go to look for Túrin. Glaurung, now living in the ruins of Nargothrond, descends into the river to create a fog. Morwen loses her way in the fog, but Niënor meets the dragon and is enspelled by him, forgetting her past. She flees to Brethil. Turambar finds her at Finduilas's grave, naked, unable to speak and remembering nothing. He names her Níniel, "Maid of Tears", and takes her to Ephel Brandir. There she is healed by Brandir, who falls in love with her; but Níniel and Turambar come to love each other. Turambar asks her to marry him; Brandir dissuades her, foreboding evil, but they are married. Turambar goes back to war when Glaurung sends Orcs to attack Brethil: taking up the sword again, Turambar drives them away. Next year Níniel conceives, and Glaurung attacks Brethil in person.

Turambar decides to ambush the Dragon and to try stabbing him from beneath. Of his two companions, Dorlas deserts, and Hunthor is killed by a stone. Turambar mortally wounds Glaurung with Gurthang, but is poisoned by the Dragon's blood and falls in a swoon. When Níniel comes to search for him, Glaurung with his last words undoes his spell, and she remembers who she is, and that Turambar is her brother. Horrified, Niënor drowns herself in the river Teiglin.

Brandir tauntingly tells Turambar what has happened. Turambar kills the defenceless Brandir and runs in madness to Finduilas's grave. There an Elf of Doriath, Mablung, confirms the words of Brandir. Turambar flees and kills himself with Gurthang. He is buried in a high mound, together with the shards of the sword. A great stone is set upon the grave, upon which the Elves write in Cirth runes:

TÚRIN TURAMBAR DAGNIR GLAURUNGA
NIËNOR NÍNIEL

(Túrin, Conqueror of Fate, Slayer of Glaurung

Niënor Níniel)

However, Niënor's body is not there. Two years later Morwen and Húrin meet there for the last time; Morwen is later buried there. The mound survives the War of Wrath and the Drowning of Beleriand; Tol Morwen becomes an island off the coast of Middle-earth.

=== Fate after death ===
Tolkien wrote several versions of a prophecy about Túrin's fate after death.

The fragmentary earliest outline mentions "purification of Turambar and Vainóni who fare shining about the world and go with the hosts of Tulkas against Melko." (Note: Tolkien 1984b, "Turambar and the Foalókë", pp. 69–143) In the finished manuscript of The Tale of Turambar and the Foalókë, this becomes a story that Túrin and Niënor were only admitted to Mandos after their parents' prayers; they entered the "bath of flame", where the Sun replenished its light, "and so were all their sorrows and stains washed away, and they dwelt as shining Valar among the blessed ones." A new detail is introduced, that "Turambar indeed shall stand beside Fionwë in the Great Wrack, and Melko and his drakes shall curse the sword of Mormakil".

In Tolkien's later writings, Niënor's fate is not mentioned, but Túrin's destiny is made even more prominent. Túrin would take part in the Last Battle before the End of the World, when Morgoth would return and make the final assault upon the Valar and the Children of Ilúvatar. In the "Earliest Silmarillion", "the spirit of Túrin" comes back and fights, and "it shall be Túrin who with his black sword will slay Morgoth", (Note: Tolkien 1986, "The Earliest 'Silmarillion'", p. 29–30, 40–41; "The Quenta", p. 125–131) elaborated in the 1930 revision of the Quenta Noldorinwa. (Note: Tolkien 1986, "Quenta Noldorinwa", p. 165) In "The Problem of Ros" (1968 or later), the last time Tolkien returned to the subject, Túrin is prophesied to return from death and kill Ancalagon the Black in the War of Wrath, replacing the role of Eärendil. (Note: Tolkien 1994 "The Problem of Ros", p. 374)

=== Line of Túrin and Niënor ===
Túrin–Tuor family tree

Bëor	Haladin
Bregolas	Haldad	Hador
Belegund	Baragund	Hareth	Galdor
Rían	Morwen	Húrin	Huor	Rían	Turgon
Túrin; Turambar	Urwen; Lalaith	Niënor; Níniel	Tuor; Eladar	Idril; Celebrindal
Elwing	Eärendil
Elros	Elrond

Colour key:
Colour	Description
	Elves
	Men
	Half-elven who chose the fate of Elves
	Half-Elven who chose the fate of mortal Men

== Analysis ==
=== Mythological parallels ===
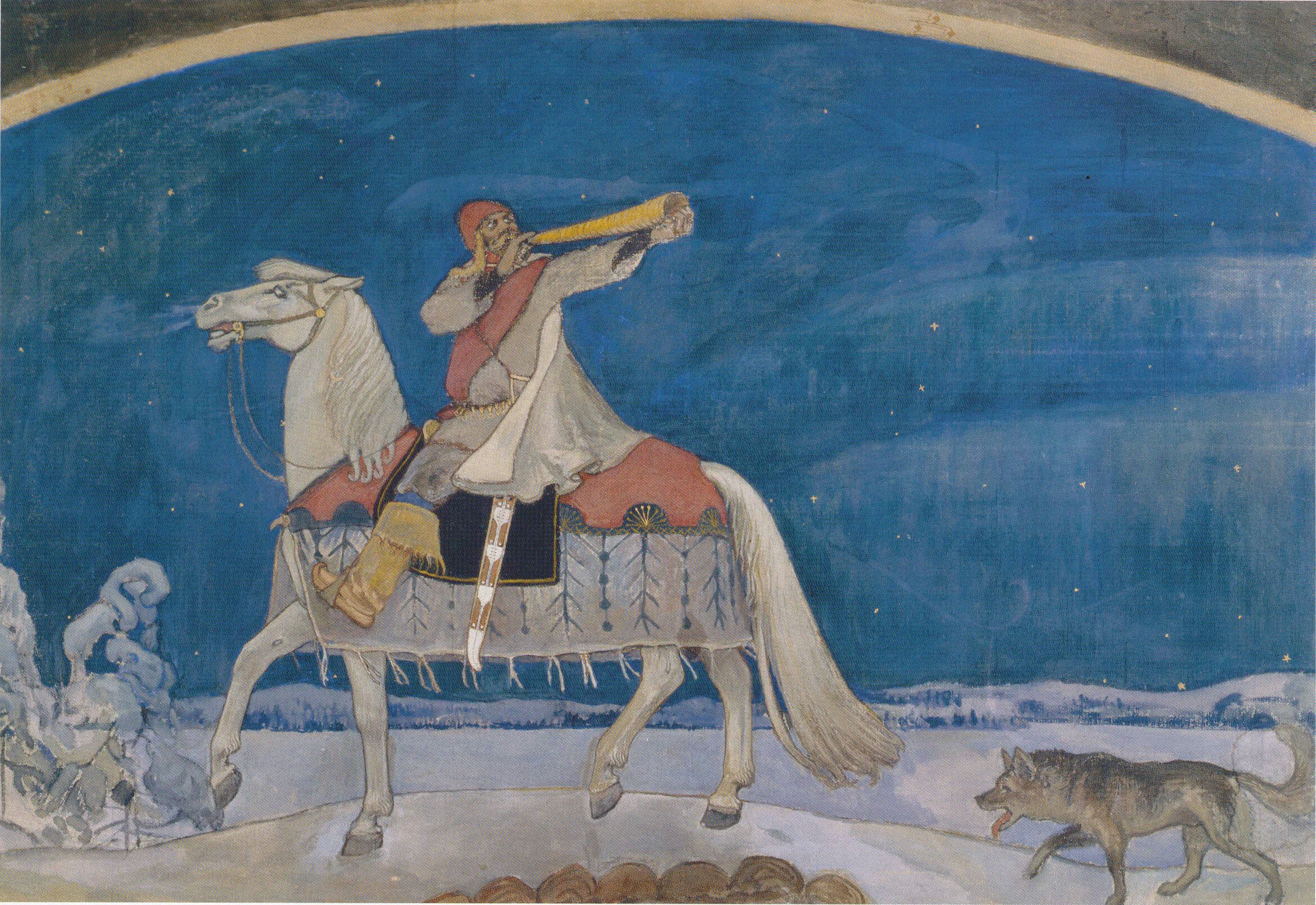
Tolkien partly based Túrin on the tragic figure of Kullervo from the Finnish Kalevala. Painting Kullervo Rides to War by Akseli Gallen-Kallela, 1901

Tolkien noted some of Túrin's mythological parallels in a letter to the publisher Milton Waldman:

There is the Children of Húrin, the tragic tale of Túrin Turambar and his sister Níniel – of which Túrin is the hero: a figure that might be said (by people who like that sort of thing, though it is not very useful) to be derived from elements in Sigurd the Volsung, Oedipus, and the Finnish Kullervo. (Note: Carpenter 2023, #131 to Milton Waldman, late 1951)

Túrin, as Tolkien stated, is mainly based on Kullervo, a character from the Finnish folklore poems known as Kalevala. Kullervo similarly committed unwitting incest with his sister, brought ruin upon his family, and slew himself. In Norse mythology, Sigmund, the father of Sigurd in the Völsunga saga, resembles Túrin in the incestuous relationship he has with his sister. In Richard Wagner's opera Die Walküre (drawn in part from the Völsung myths), Siegmund and Sieglinde are parallels of Túrin and Niënor. Further, Túrin is like Sigurd, as both achieve great renown for the slaying of a dragon of immense power: in Sigurd's case Fafnir; in Túrin's, Glaurung. The Tolkien scholar Verlyn Flieger further likens the tale of Túrin to Arthurian Legend, with its complex manuscript history and "overlapping story variants in both poetry and prose", supplemented by Tolkien's pretence that he was translating a lost Narn poem from its original Elvish language.

Tolkien mentions the resemblance to the unfortunate Oedipus, prince of Thebes, who unwittingly fulfils a prophecy that he will kill his father and marry his mother. The Tolkien scholar Richard C. West, in The J. R. R. Tolkien Encyclopedia, writes that the tale "is one of almost unrelieved gloom", though a prophecy in Tolkien's mythology holds that Túrin will help in the final defeat of Morgoth, after the end of the world, and that he and his sister will be cleansed of their sin. West writes that as in many other stories of Middle-earth, there is a "delicate balance" between fate, whereby each character inevitably takes certain actions and suffers the consequences, and free will, whereby he makes his own bold or rash choices that determine the outcomes for him.

Parallels of Túrin to mythical heroes, as noted by Tolkien
Source	Hero	Curse	Incest	Kills dragon	Suicide	Disaster to his people
Tolkien	Túrin	Yes	Yes with sister	Yes; Glaurung	Yes	Yes
Kalevala; Finnish mythology	Kullervo	Yes	Yes with sister		Yes	Yes
Völsunga saga Norse mythology	Sigmund		Yes			
Völsunga saga Norse mythology	Sigurd (Sigmund's son)			Yes; Fafnir	(is murdered)	
Greek mythology	Oedipus	Yes kills father	Yes marries mother			Yes

=== A woman in wartime ===
According to the biographer Charles Moseley, Niënor and Túrin are one of only four "couples whose love gets much space" in Tolkien's works; the others are Lúthien and Beren; Eärendil and Elwing; and Aragorn and Arwen. West described the story of Niënor's family as tragic. Elizabeth A. Whittingham wrote in A Companion to J. R. R. Tolkien that the story had grown darker with time, commenting that "no tale of Middle-earth is as dark as that", and stating that in its rendition in The Silmarillion as published in 1977 with the end omitted, contrary to the author's original intent, "all glimmer of hope has been extinguished". The scholar of literature Victoria Holtz-Wodzak calls Niënor a "study of the lives of women during wartime. She is, for all practical purposes, a war orphan". Holtz-Wodzak sees the war-time fate of the women in Tolkien's life as well as his own experiences as inspiration for the character and its sympathetic treatment by the author. Holtz-Wodzak also compares his situation to that of Brandír, who as a non-combatant loses the struggle with Turambar for both the respect of his people and the love of Níniel. The scholar even sees an echo of Tolkien's sentiments about not being able to be active in World War II due to age in "Niennor's desperate wish either to keep the man she loves from danger or to die with him".
