= Jason Fisher =

Tolkien expert

Jason Fisher is a Tolkien scholar and winner of multiple Mythopoeic Scholarship Awards, including one in 2014 for his book Tolkien and the Study of His Sources: Critical Essays. He served as the editor of the Mythopoeic Society's monthly Mythprint from 2010 to 2013. He is the author of many book chapters, academic articles, and encyclopedia entries on J. R. R. Tolkien.

== Biography ==
Jason Aldrich Fisher was born in 1970. He lives in Dallas, Texas. He is a software developer. He has worked since 2002 as an independent scholar specialising in the work of J. R. R. Tolkien, his literary circle the Inklings, and fantasy more widely.

Fisher has contributed to the J. R. R. Tolkien Encyclopedia (including on 'Mythology for England', 'Family Trees', and 'Palantíri'), to the Tolkien Studies journal, to the Literary Encyclopedia, and to the Inklings journal Mythlore, among other journals and websites, as well as chapters of Tolkien criticism. He has been interviewed on PBS about Tolkien's 1937 book The Hobbit.

== Reception ==
=== Tolkien and the Study of His Sources ===
Reviewing Tolkien and the Study of His Sources for Mythlore, Mike Foster writes that Fisher, and Tom Shippey who wrote the book's introduction, are right in pursuing Tolkien's sources, despite the author's objections; the book usefully clarifies Tolkien's approach for readers not familiar with early 20th century adventure stories and medieval stories of the saints. In Foster's view, while scholars have long ago picked the "low-hanging fruit", the book "proves that ... plenty of fruit still remains for the picking".

Emily Auger, reviewing the same work in Journal of the Fantastic in the Arts, writes that "Fisher ... not only explains what source studies are, he explains how good source studies should be done".

== Works ==
=== Books ===
- 2011 (editor) Tolkien and the Study of His Sources: Critical Essays, McFarland & Company.
- 2012 (editor, with Salwa Khoddam and Mark R. Hall) C.S. Lewis and the Inklings: Discovering Hidden Truth, Cambridge Scholars Publishing.
- 2015 (editor, with Salwa Khoddam and Mark R. Hall) C.S. Lewis and the Inklings: Reflections on Faith, Imagination, and Modern Technology, Cambridge Scholars Publishing.

== Awards and distinctions ==
- 2010 Best Scholar Paper, 13th Annual C.S. Lewis and Inklings Conference
- 2011 Best Scholar Paper, 14th Annual C.S. Lewis and Inklings Conference
- 2012 Best Scholar Paper, 15th Annual C.S. Lewis and Inklings Conference
- 2013 Best Scholar Paper, 16th Annual C.S. Lewis and Inklings Conference
- 2014 Best Scholar Paper, 17th Annual C.S. Lewis and Inklings Conference
- 2014 Mythopoeic Scholarship Award
