= Noble outlaw =

Literary archetype

The noble outlaw is a literary archetype found in cultures around the world. Other phrases denoting the same or a similar concept include "knight-errant", particular to European medieval chivalric romance literature, and Byronic hero, especially in European Romanticism.

== Definition ==
Hubert Babinski, in a review of a study of the 18th-century Italian bandit-outlaw Angelo Duca defines it as follows: the noble outlaw is "a basically good person who had been wronged early in his life by some superior in the social hierarchy. On the basis of that experience the young man decides that such a wrong can only be redressed if the society changes, but such changes can not come from within the social system, only in defiance of it."

Peter L. Thorslev, Jr., in his book on The Byronic Hero in the 1960s, described the noble outlaw as a development of a prior archetype, the gothic villain, that in its turn led to the Byronic hero. Both noble outlaw and gothic villain are rebels, against society and even against God or gods, but the gothic villain is not a hero, whereas noble outlaws "are invariably solitaries, and are fundamentally and heroically rebellious" against injustices, be they divine or of their fellow humans. He related these developments to shifts in the values of Romantic authors and readers "from conformism in large social patterns of conduct or thought, to radical individualism; from humble right reason, common sense, and the proper study of mankind, to a thirst to know and experience all things, to encompass infinities; from acquiescence before God and the social order, to heroism and hubris". However, noble outlaws retained nostalgic vestiges of the past, as they rebelled in part against the rise of bureaucratic nation states and harked back to the more feudalistic times of "personal loyalties; personal justice; and personal heroism". He characterized the noble outlaw as "certainly the single most popular hero of the Romantic Movement".

== Examples ==
In medieval European literature, a well-known example is Robin Hood. Others are found in the Decameron, Two Gentlemen of Verona, Don Quixote (Roque Guinart), and The Beggar's Opera. These are named in Paul Angiolillo's study of Angelo Duca; Babinski notes that Angiolillo's relies for his analysis on the work of Eric Hobsbawm. Examples from the Romantic period in Europe include Goethe's Götz, Friedrich Schiller's Karl Moor, and Walter Scott's Lord Marmion and Byron's Conrad. A 20th-century American example is Arthur Miller's John Proctor.

The noble outlaw as highwayman was a widespread and popular character in the literature of the 18th century (colonial era) Southern United States and thenceforwards. Highwaymen were portrayed almost as social reformers, championing the people and avenging injustices done against them. Karl Moor, aforementioned, was emblematic of this, and The Robbers had lasting appeal in the South. Walter Scott himself was to describe his historical novels as full of "the dubious characters of Borderers, buccaneers, Highland robbers, and all others of a Robin Hood description".

In Chinese culture, the archetype is called hsia, or wuxia. In Japanese literature, a semi-legendary figure is Ishikawa Goemon.

In 1910 Maud Isabel Ebbutt characterized the eponymous characters of The Tale of Gamelyn and William of Cloudslee as noble outlaws, who are always historical in tales, and who "stand in the mind of the populace for justice and true liberty against the oppressive tyranny of subordinate officials [...] and are always taken into favour by the king, the fount of true justice".

== See also ==
- Folk hero
- Outlaw
