= Thingol =

Fictional character in J. R.R. Tolkien's legendarium

- Tolkien character
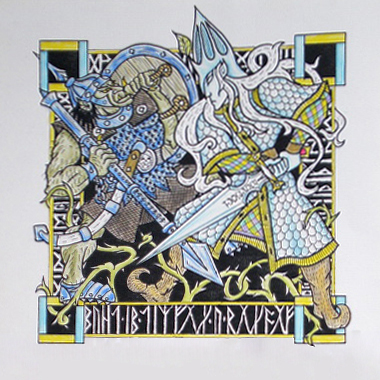
- A battle between Thingol (right) and the Orc chieftain Boldog. Illustration by Tom Loback.

In-universe information
- Aliases: Elwë Singollo, Elu Thingol
- Race: Elves
- Gender: Male
- Book(s): The Silmarillion, The Children of Húrin, The Lays of Beleriand, Beren & Lúthien

Elu Thingol or Elwë Singollo is a fictional character in J.R.R. Tolkien's Middle-earth legendarium. He appears in The Silmarillion, The Lays of Beleriand and The Children of Húrin and in numerous stories in The History of Middle-earth. The King of Doriath, King of the Sindar Elves, High-king (Note: Tolkien 1994, p. 21, "Fingolfin...acknowledged the high-kingship of Thingol"; p. 380, Thingol is acknowledged high-king by Círdan and his following; p. 410, the Grey-elves of Mithrim acknowledged Thingol as high-king.) and Lord of Beleriand, he is a major character in the First Age of Middle-earth and an essential part of the ancestral backgrounding of the romance between Aragorn and Arwen in The Lord of the Rings. Alone among the Elves, he married an angelic Maia, Melian.

Scholars have written that Thingol turns away from the light, so that when he receives a Silmaril, he is unable to appreciate it. They have stated, too, that he fails to take advantage of his marriage to Melian, instead ignoring her advice about the Silmaril, leading to the downfall of his kingdom.

== Fictional history ==
Arda in the First Age. The Elves awaken in Middle-earth (right). Elwë (Thingol), Finwë, and Ingwë encourage their peoples to obey the call of the Valar and travel to Valinor (green arrows to the left), but some refuse, causing the first Sundering of the Elves. When the Noldor return to Beleriand (red arrows to the left), Thingol is suspicious of them and refuses to fight the common enemy Morgoth alongside them.

In The Silmarillion, Thingol is introduced as Elwë, one of the three chieftains (with Finwë and Ingwë) of the Elves who depart from Cuiviénen, the place where the Elves awaken, with the Vala Oromë as ambassadors to Valinor, and who later become Kings. Upon his return, he persuades many of his people to follow him west to Valinor. This host becomes known as the Teleri. (Note: Tolkien 1977, ch. 3 "Of the Coming of the Elves and the Captivity of Melkor") Some of the Teleri go to Valinor, following Thingol's younger brother Olwë. (Note: Tolkien 1996, "Last Writings") Thingol meanwhile meets Melian the Maia, an angelic immortal, and falls in love with her; they create an enchantment which keeps his people from finding him. (Note: Tolkien 1977, ch. 4 "Of Thingol and Melian") Others of the Teleri reach the northwestern region of Beleriand, but choose to remain there to look for Thingol, who had disappeared there. They later inhabit the forest realm of Doriath, when Thingol reappears and sets up his Kingdom of Doriath and his city of Menegroth; they are among the Sindar or Grey Elves of Beleriand. Alone of his people, he is an Elf of the Light as he has seen the light of the Two Trees of Valinor. (Note: Tolkien 1977, ch. 10 "Of the Sindar") (Note: Tolkien 1977, ch. 21 "Of Túrin Turambar")

Thingol and Melian have a daughter, Lúthien, who in turn falls in love with the mortal Man Beren. Disapproving of their relationship, Thingol sets numerous quests that he thinks impossible for Beren, so as to prevent him from marrying Lúthien. One of these quests is to recover one of the priceless star-jewels, the Silmarils which Fëanor had created, and the Dark Lord Morgoth had stolen and set in his crown; but even that quest succeeds. (Note: Tolkien 1977, ch. 19 "Of Beren and Lúthien")

Thingol fights several wars with Morgoth. He is suspicious of the Noldor Elves when they arrive in Beleriand, (Note: Tolkien 1977, ch. 13 "Of the Return of the Noldo") and refuses to assist them when they fight Morgoth. (Note: Tolkien 1977, ch. 15 "Of the Noldor in Beleriand") The hero of Men, Húrin, comes to Menegroth in his old age, lamenting the death of his son Túrin. In bitter rage he hurls the treasured necklace of the fallen Noldor city of Nargothrond, the Nauglamír, at Thingol's feet. Melian sees Húrin's thought, and deals with him gently; Húrin is sorry, and gives Thingol the Nauglamír. Thingol gets some Dwarves to set his Silmaril in the necklace. The Dwarves do so, but come to covet the unequalled work, and ask Thingol if they may keep it as payment. Thingol angrily refuses; offended, the Dwarves kill him and sack Menegroth. The Sons of Fëanor, who had sworn a terrible oath to recover the Silmarils on behalf of their father, later destroy Doriath to recover the Silmaril; they kill Dior, Thingol's grandson, the second and last King of Doriath. (Note: Tolkien 1977, ch. 22 "Of the Ruin of Doriath")

== Analysis ==
In Tolkien's constructed languages, Thingol is Sindarin for "grey cloak", "greymantle", while the Quenya form of his name, Singollo, has the same meaning. (Note: Tolkien 1977, annotated index entry for "Thingol") The medievalist and Tolkien scholar Verlyn Flieger writes that while the name Elwë ("the star") indicates light, this is dimmed by the character's second name, the light being "cloaked or mantled over". Further, Flieger comments that the softening of "Singollo" to "Thingol" can also be taken as a diminishment, reflecting the "sound shifts that occur as light-infused Quenya modifies to twilight Sindarin".

Flieger states that Thingol's actions may seem unjustified thematically, but they make sense in terms of his politics and dynastic needs. She contrasts him with Beren, who though a Man is constantly drawn towards the light. With the return of the Noldor to Middle-earth, perhaps threatening his kingdom, Thingol's mood darkens. After he learns of the Elf-on-Elf Kinslaying at Alqualondë perpetrated by the Noldor on the Teleri, Thingol (Telerin himself) bans the use of their language Quenya in his lands, and Sindarin becomes the most prevalent Elven tongue in Middle-earth. He takes successively darker actions, moving further and further from the light, so that even when he receives the Silmaril from Beren, he knows neither how to appreciate it nor how to use it.

Robley Evans, writing in Mythlore, draws a parallel between Thingol and Fëanor: like him, he turns away from the Light, and chooses to remain in Middle-earth with Melian, who could stop time and its changes. Evans states that Thingol's marriage with Melian seems to "promise a model union of diverse created beings" on first impression. He comments that Thingol is however the "complementary opposite of Fëanor in Tolkien's structural counterpoint" in that he is ultimately destroyed by his own version of Fëanor's oath; the act of claiming the Silmaril recovered by Beren places his kingdom under the Doom of Mandos. This warned that the Elves would come to harm if they continued their rebellion against the Valar.

The Tolkien scholar Tom Shippey writes that Thingol forms part of the tightly-woven plot of The Silmarillion, each part leading ultimately to tragedy. There are three Hidden Elvish Kingdoms, including Doriath, founded by Thingol and his relatives, and they are each betrayed and destroyed. The Kingdoms are each penetrated by a mortal Man, in Doriath's case Beren; and the sense of Doom, which Shippey glosses as "future disaster", hangs heavy over all of them in the tale.

Tom Shippey's analysis of the Hidden Kingdoms of Beleriand
Hidden Kingdom	Elvish Kings (all relatives)	Man who penetrates the Kingdom	Result
Nargothrond	Finrod	Túrin	City destroyed
Doriath	Thingol	Beren	City destroyed
Gondolin	Turgon	Tuor	City destroyed

The medievalist Marjorie Burns states that Thingol gains "great power" through his marriage to Melian, writing that she resembles Rider Haggard's infinitely desirable Arthurian muse, Ayesha of his 1887 novel She: A History of Adventure.

The scholar of religion Lisa Coutras compares Melanie Rawls's account of Thingol and Melian to Lisa Hopkins's analysis of Tuor and Idril. Rawls presents Thingol as a prideful king who rarely listens to his wife's counsel, even though she has immense foresight and wisdom; this helps to bring about the downfall of his kingdom. Hopkins discusses the hero Tuor, who is all the wiser for listening to his wife Idril.

== The House of Thingol ==
Family tree (Note: Tolkien 1980, "The History of Galadriel and Celeborn") (Note: Tolkien 1996, "The Shibboleth of Fëanor")

Melian the Maia	Thingol (Elwë)	Elmo §	Olwë	Círdan the shipwright
Galadhon §	Eärwen	Finarfin
Lúthien	Galathil §	Celeborn	Galadriel	Angrod	Edhellos ¶	Finrod	Aegnor
Dior	Nimloth	Orodreth ¶
Eluréd	Elurín	Elwing	Finduilas	Gil-galad ¶
Elros	Elrond	Celebrían
Elendil
Isildur	Anárion
Arvedui	Fíriel
Aragorn	Arwen	Elladan	Elrohir
Eldarion

Colour key:
Colour	Description
	Elves
	Men
	Maiar
	Half-elven
	Half-Elven who chose the fate of Elves
	Half-Elven who chose the fate of mortal Men

§ These figures appear in Unfinished Tales, but not in the published Silmarillion. Late in life Tolkien revised the descent of Celeborn to make him a Teler of Alqualondë.

¶ In the published Silmarillion, Edhellos does not appear, Orodreth is Finarfin's son (and still Finduilas' father), and Gil-galad is Fingon's son (and thus would not be on this tree).

== Sources ==
- Flieger, Verlyn (1983). Splintered Light: Logos and Language in Tolkien's World. William B. Eerdmans. ISBN 978-0-8028-1955-0.
- Shippey, Tom (2005) [1982]. The Road to Middle-Earth: How J. R. R. Tolkien Created a New Mythology (Third ed.). HarperCollins. ISBN 978-0-261-10275-0.
- Tolkien, J. R. R. (1977). Christopher Tolkien (ed.). The Silmarillion. Boston: Houghton Mifflin. ISBN 978-0-395-25730-2.
- Tolkien, J. R. R. (1994). Christopher Tolkien (ed.). The War of the Jewels. Boston: Houghton Mifflin. ISBN 0-395-71041-3.
- Tolkien, J. R. R. (1996). Christopher Tolkien (ed.). The Peoples of Middle-earth. Boston: Houghton Mifflin. ISBN 978-0-395-82760-4.
