= Maiar =

Divine race from J. R. R. Tolkien's legendarium

The Maiar (sing. Maia) are a fictional class of beings from J. R. R. Tolkien's high fantasy legendarium. Supernatural and angelic, they are "lesser Ainur" (as opposed to the Valar) who entered the cosmos of Eä in the beginning of time. The name Maiar is in the Quenya tongue (one of several languages constructed by Tolkien) from the Elvish root maya- "excellent, admirable". (Note: Tolkien, J. R. R., "Words, Phrases and Passages", Parma Eldalamberon 17, p. 174.)

Commentators have noted that since the Maiar are immortals but can choose to become fully incarnate in men's bodies on Middle-earth, they can be killed; Tolkien did not explain what happened to them then. Others have observed that their semi-divine nature and the fact that they can be sent on missions to work out the divine purpose makes them much like the angels of Christianity.

== Description ==
=== Lesser Ainur ===
Tolkien stated that "Maia is the name of the Kin of the Valar, but especially of those of lesser power than the 9 great rulers".

In the Valaquenta, Tolkien wrote that the Maiar are "spirits whose being also began before the world, of the same order as the Valar but of less degree". According to the Valaquenta, many Maiar associated themselves with a particular Vala; for example, Salmar created for his lord Ulmo great conches who produce the music of the sea known as Ulumúri, (Note: Tolkien 1977, Quenta Silmarillion, Chapter 1: "Of the Beginning of Days") while Curumo, who came to be known in Middle-earth as Saruman, was with Aulë the smith. The being once known as Mairon also was with Aulë, before being corrupted by Melkor and becoming Sauron, the main antagonist of The Lord of the Rings. (Note: Tolkien 1977, "Valaquenta") Sauron continued his association with smithcraft by befriending the Elven-smiths of Eregion during the Second Age, so that he could gain power over the other rings by forging his One Ring. On the other hand, certain Maiar like Olórin and Melian develop associations with multiple Valar Lords and Queens.

Being of divine origin and possessing great power, the Maiar can wander the world unseen or shape themselves in fashion of Elves or other creatures; these "veils", called fanar in Quenya, could be destroyed, but their true-being could not. Rarely did the Maiar adopt their visible forms to Elves and Men, and for that reason, very few of the Maiar have names in their tongues, and the elves do not know how many of the Maiar exist.

=== Named Maiar ===
Only a few of the Maiar are named. These include the Chiefs of the Maiar, Eönwë the Herald of Manwë, King of the Valar, and Ilmarë the Handmaiden of Varda, Lady of the Stars; (Note: Tolkien 1977, Valaquenta, "Of the Maiar") Ossë and Uinen, spirits who rule the seas and act under the Lord of Waters Ulmo; Arien, guide of the sun and a spirit of fire uncorrupted by Melkor; Olórin, the wisest Maia, and Tilion, guide of the moon and the servant of the Huntsman of the Valar, Oromë. (Note: Tolkien 1977, Quenta Silmarillion, Chapter 11: "Of the Sun and Moon and the Hiding of Valinor".)

Melkor (known in Sindarin as Morgoth), the evil Vala, corrupted many Maiar into his service. Among Morgoth's most dangerous servants, they are called Úmaiar in Quenya: these include Sauron, and Gothmog, Lord of the Balrogs, large demonic beings of flame and shadow armed with fiery whips, (Note: Tolkien 1977 describes the fiery whips; Tolkien 1985 describes Morgoth's prisoners tortured by Balrogs with scourges; and the Balrog in Moria (Tolkien 1954a, "The Bridge of Khazad-dûm") is armed with a "whip of many thongs".) and are said to be perhaps more powerful than dragons. (Note: Tolkien 1984b, Part II, "Turambar and the Foalókë", p.85: "yet of all are they [dragons] the most powerful, save it be the Balrogs only.") Morgoth is eventually overthrown when his fortresses are destroyed in the War of Wrath by the hosts of the West led by Eönwë. (Note: Tolkien 1977, Quenta Silmarillion, ch. 24, p. 252.) Most of the Balrogs did not survive Morgoth's defeat, which marked the end of the First Age, although at least one hid deep beneath the Misty Mountains until well into the Third Age. (Note: Tolkien 1955, Appendix A (III).)

The Maia Melian went to Middle-earth prior to the First Age, where she later fell in love with the Elven-king Elu Thingol, King Greymantle, and with him ruled the kingdom of Doriath. When war with Morgoth came to Doriath, she used her powers to guard and defend her realm with an enchantment called the Girdle of Melian (List Melian in Sindarin). She had a daughter with Thingol named Lúthien, said to be the fairest and most beautiful of all the Children of Ilúvatar. Some of Melian's notable descendants through Lúthien include Elwing, Elrond, Arwen, Elendil, and Aragorn.

=== Wizards ===
In the Third Age, the Valar sent five Maiar to Middle-earth to help contest the evil of Sauron. They had great skills of hand and mind and assumed the guise of Men, seemingly old but of great vigour. (Note: Tolkien 1980, "The Istari", pp. 388 ff.) Their mission was to guide elves and men by gaining trust and spreading knowledge, not by ruling them with fear and force. They were known as the Istari or Wizards, and included Gandalf the Grey (Olórin or Mithrandir, later Gandalf the White), Saruman the White (Curumo or Curunír; he later called himself Saruman of Many Colours), Radagast the Brown (Aiwendil), and two "Blue Wizards" (named after their sea-blue robes) who are mentioned in passing within commentary about the development of Tolkien's legendarium, but do not appear in his narratives.

== Analysis ==
The theologian Ralph C. Wood describes the Valar and Maiar as being what Christians "would call angels", intermediaries between the creator, named as Eru Ilúvatar in The Silmarillion, and the created cosmos. Like angels, they have free will and can therefore rebel against him.

Grant C. Sterling, writing in Mythlore, states that the Maiar resemble the Valar in being unable to die, but differ in being able to choose to incarnate fully in forms such as men's bodies. This means that, like Gandalf and the Balrogs, they can be killed. He notes that Sauron's inability ever to take bodily form again after his defeat could be the result of having given his power to the One Ring, but that the fate of slain Maiar remains unclear.

Jonathan Evans, writing in the J.R.R. Tolkien Encyclopedia, calls the Maiar semidivine spirits, and notes that each one is linked with one of the Valar. He states that they have "perpetual importance in the cosmic order", noting the statement in The Silmarillion that their joy "is as an air that they breathe in all their days, whose thought flows in a tide untroubled from the heights to the deeps." Evans notes, too, that Arien and Tilion are central in Tolkien's myth of the Sun and Moon.

== See also ==
- Goldberry
- Tom Bombadil
