= Gil-galad =

- Tolkien character

In-universe information
- Aliases: Ereinion, Artanáro/Rodnor, Finellach, Finwain; High King of the Noldor
- Race: Elves
- Book(s): The Lord of the Rings (1954); The Silmarillion (1977)

Gil-galad is a fictional character in J. R. R. Tolkien's Middle-earth legendarium, the last High King of the Noldor, one of the main divisions of Elves. He is mentioned in The Lord of the Rings, where the hobbit Sam Gamgee recites a fragment of a poem about him, and The Silmarillion. In the Last Alliance of Elves and Men, Gil-galad and Elendil laid siege to the Dark Lord Sauron's fortress of Barad-dûr, and fought him hand-to-hand for the One Ring. Gil-galad and Elendil were both killed, but Sauron was wounded. This allowed Elendil's son Isildur to cut the Ring from Sauron's hand, defeating Sauron, and to take the Ring for himself.

Gil-galad briefly appears at the opening of Peter Jackson's The Lord of the Rings film trilogy, in several video games based on Middle-earth, and as a secondary character in the TV series The Rings of Power.

== Appearances ==
=== Prose ===
Gil-galad was an Elf of a royal house of Beleriand; beyond that, accounts of his birth vary. According to The Silmarillion, he was born into the house of Finwë as a son of Fingon sometime in the First Age, and as a child, he was sent away during the Siege of Angband for safekeeping with Círdan the shipwright in the Falas. (Note: Tolkien 1977 Chapter 18, "Of the Ruin of Beleriand and the Fall of Fingolfin") Alternatively, according to Tolkien's last writings on the subject, he was a son of Orodreth, who became a son of Angrod, son of Finarfin. Christopher Tolkien rejected these changes for The Silmarillion, a decision he later regretted. (Note: Tolkien 1996 "The Shibboleth of Fëanor", "The parentage of Gil-galad")

He became the High King of the Noldor-in-Exile in Beleriand after the fall of Gondolin and the death of the previous High King, Turgon. (Note: Tolkien 1977 Chapter 23, "Of Tuor and the Fall of Gondolin") After the War of Wrath and the end of the First Age, Gil-galad founded a realm in the coastal region of Lindon along the shores of Belegaer, the Great Sea. At its height, his realm extended eastward as far as the Misty Mountains. (Note: Tolkien 1977 "Of the Rings of Power and the Third Age") King Tar-Aldarion of Númenor presented Gil-galad with the gift of some seeds of the Mallorn tree; he in turn gave some to Galadriel, who grew them in the guarded land of Lothlórien. (Note: Tolkien 1980, Part II, Chapter 1 "A Description of Númenor") Gil-galad did not take a wife and had no children. He was the first of the Eldar to mistrust a stranger who called himself Annatar, and forbade him from entering Lindon. His mistrust was well founded, for Annatar was in fact Sauron. About the year 1600 of the Second Age, Sauron secretly forged the One Ring. Celebrimbor, the creator of the Three Rings, gave two of them, Narya and Vilya, to Gil-galad for safe-keeping once he knew Sauron's intention to take them. Gil-galad passed Narya to Círdan the shipwright, who stated that this was only to keep it secret; Círdan never used it. Gil-galad chose to give Vilya, and control of Eriador, to Elrond. (Note: Tolkien 1980 "The History of Galadriel and Celeborn") War broke out between the Elves and Sauron; Gil-galad asked the Númenóreans for help, and their king Tar-Minastir brought a great force, enabling Gil-galad to defeat Sauron's army.

After the Downfall of Númenor there was peace in Middle-earth. At the end of the Second Age, Sauron reappeared with a newly formed army and made war against the kingdom of Gondor, near his old home of Mordor. Gil-galad formed the Last Alliance of Elves and Men with the High King of Men, Elendil. The armies of Elves and Men entered Mordor and laid siege to Sauron's fortress of Barad-dûr. At the end of the siege, Sauron finally came forth and fought hand-to-hand against Gil-galad and Elendil on the slopes of Mount Doom, losing the One Ring but killing them both. (Note: Tolkien 1955 Appendix B, "The Second Age") A record left by Isildur in Minas Tirith implies that Sauron himself killed Gil-galad with the heat of his bare hands. Recalling the encounter at the Council of Elrond at Rivendell before the Fellowship took the One Ring south, Elrond said that only he and Círdan stood by Gil-galad in that fight. (Note: Tolkien 1954a Book II, Chapter 2: "The Council of Elrond")

=== Poetry ===
In The Fellowship of the Ring, on the way to Weathertop, Aragorn mentions Gil-galad, prompting the hobbit Sam Gamgee to recite a fragment, three stanzas, of "Gil-galad was an Elven-king":

Gil-galad was an Elven-king.
Of him the harpers sadly sing:
The last whose realm was fair and free
Between the mountains and the sea.

His sword was long, his lance was keen.
His shining helm afar was seen.
The countless stars of heaven's field
Were mirrored in his silver shield.

But long ago he rode away,
And where he dwelleth none can say.
For into darkness fell his star;
In Mordor, where the shadows are. (Note: Tolkien 1954a Book I, Chapter 11 "A Knife in the Dark")

Sam's companions are impressed, and ask for more; Sam admits that is all that he learnt from Bilbo. Aragorn says the fragment is a translation from "an ancient tongue" and suggests that the hobbits may hear the rest in Rivendell. The Tolkien scholar Tom Shippey comments that the longer poem does not exist, and that Sam's fragment seems to have been composed while Tolkien was writing the chapter. He notes that it has the form of a ballad, each stanza being a quatrain in eulogy mode with end-rhymes in the rhyming pattern AABB/CCDD.

== Artefacts ==
=== Aeglos, the spear ===
Gil-galad's spear was named Aeglos or Aiglos, meaning "snow-point" or "snow-thorn" or more commonly "icicle" (Note: Tolkien 1977 p. 313) (aeg: sharp, pointed; los: snow) because when orcs saw his spear, they would recognize it by its reputation to bring a cold death to them. Elrond said that at the battle of Dagorlad, "we had the mastery: for the Spear of Gil-galad and the Sword of Elendil, Aiglos and Narsil, none could withstand." (Note: Tolkien 1977 p. 294) (Note: Tolkien 1980 pp. 148, 417) The connection of Elf and spear could relate to the English surname Elgar, which may represent Old English aelf-gar, "elf-spear".

=== Heraldic devices ===
Gil-galad's heraldic device with stars on a blue field

Tolkien created two sketches of heraldic devices for Gil-galad. They were drawn on an envelope posted to him in 1960, along with a device containing a star or Silmaril for Eärendil. The Tolkien scholars Wayne G. Hammond and Christina Scull note that matching the description in the poem, "The countless stars of heaven's field / Were mirrored in his silver shield", the lozenge-shaped devices both contain stars, with an elongated star in each corner. Margaret Purdy, in Mythlore, writes that Gil-galad's shield, like all elvish heraldry personal not inherited, seems to incorporate his stars, though the field is blue not silver.

=== Family tree ===
House of Finwë family tree (Note: Tolkien 1977, "Of the Rings of Power and the Third Age": Family Tree I: "The house of Finwë and the Noldorin descent of Elrond and Elros") (Note: Tolkien 1977, "Of the Rings of Power and the Third Age": Family Tree II: "The descendants of Olwë and Elwë") (Note: Tolkien 1955, Appendix A: Annals of the Kings and Rulers, I The Númenórean Kings) (Note: Tolkien 1996, "The Shibboleth of Fëanor")

Míriel "broideress"	Finwë of the Noldor	Indis of the Vanyar
Fëanor, maker of Silmarils	Findis §	Fingolfin	Lalwen §	Finarfin
Maedhros	Five sons	Curufin	Fingon	Turgon	Aredhel	Argon §	Finrod	Angrod	Aegnor	Galadriel
Celebrimbor, maker of Rings	Idril	Maeglin	Orodreth ¶
Eärendil	Finduilas	Gil-galad ¶
Elros	Elrond	Celebrían
Aragorn	Arwen	Elladan	Elrohir
Eldarion

Colour key:
Colour	Description
	Elves
	Men
	Maiar
	Half-Elven
	Half-Elven who chose the fate of Elves
	Half-Elven who chose the fate of mortal Men

Kings of the Noldor in Valinor

High Kings of the Noldor in exile in Middle-earth

§ These figures do not appear in the published Silmarillion. The family tree as presented follows Tolkien's late note The Shibboleth of Fëanor.

¶ In the published Silmarillion, Orodreth is Finarfin's second son (and still Finduilas' father), and Gil-galad is Fingon's son.

== Concept and creation ==
Gil-galad means "star of bright light" in Sindarin. His names in Tolkien's invented languages of Quenya and Sindarin were Artanáro and Rodnor, respectively. His Sindarin birth name, Ereinion, means "scion of kings". (Note: Tolkien 1996 "The Shibboleth of Fëanor", "The names of Finwë's descendants")

Tolkien considered several different parentages for Gil-galad in different draft texts, including making him the son of Orodreth. In the second version of The Fall of Númenor, he is called a descendant of Fëanor, who made the Silmarils. (Note: Tolkien 1987 Part One: II. The Fall of Númenor, (iii) "The second version of The Fall of Númenor") Then Tolkien treated him as a son of Finrod Felagund. (Note: Tolkien 1994 Part Two: "The Later Quenta Silmarillion: Of the Ruin of Beleriand and the Fall of Fingolfin") Christopher Tolkien, editing the published version of The Silmarillion, made Gil-galad the son of Fingon, a decision he later regretted, saying he should have left the parentage obscure.

Renee Vink, of the Dutch Tolkien Society, suggests that the only good reason for making him son of Fingon is the correspondence of the colours, blue and silver, of Gil-galad's heraldic device and Fingolfin's banner. She notes that the publication of The Silmarillion, based on a limited "grasp of the material", created a "virtually unshakeable" tradition for this parentage. She argues that Orodreth has a better claim to paternity, for several reasons: the crown of the Noldor in exile (in Middle-earth) then comes to a descendant of Finarfin, king of the Noldor in Aman; a descendant of Finarfin would fight Sauron to avenge Finarfin's son Finrod; and as brother to Finduilas, he (alone of the Noldor's Kings) would fight with a spear, the weapon that killed his sister.

The scholar of literature Lawrence Krikorian, in Mallorn, writes that Elrond's account of his personal observation of being Gil-galad's herald in the Second Age, thousands of years earlier, helps to make the narrative function as history rather than allegory. This, he writes, lends an impression of depth.

== Adaptations ==
=== Film, TV, and radio ===
Gil-galad (played by Mark Ferguson, centre right) and his herald Elrond (Hugo Weaving, left), as envisaged in Peter Jackson's 2001 film The Fellowship of the Ring

In the 1981 BBC Radio 4 dramatisation of The Lord of the Rings, the Lay of Gil-galad was set to music by Stephen Oliver.

In the Lord of the Rings film trilogy by Peter Jackson, Gil-galad is portrayed by Mark Ferguson. He appears very briefly in The Fellowship of the Ring during the opening prologue sequence. Gil-galad is mentioned in the behind-the-scenes documentaries included with the Special Extended Edition DVD of The Fellowship of the Ring and is listed in the credits. In an interview with Ferguson and Craig Parker (Haldir), Ferguson stated that it had been planned for his death to be depicted onscreen as in the book, but it was considered too violent.

In the Amazon Prime Video The Lord of the Rings: The Rings of Power TV series, which focuses on events in the Second Age, Gil-Galad is played by Benjamin Walker.

=== Games ===
Gil-galad has been included in multiple video games since Jackson's films were first shown. The 2004 video game The Lord of the Rings: The Third Age featured Mark Ferguson as Gil-galad. Others are the 2007 The Lord of the Rings Online; the 2011 The Lord of the Rings: War in the North; and the 2012 Lego The Lord of the Rings which has Gil-galad near Mount Doom.

== Sources ==
- Hammond, Wayne G.; Scull, Christina (1995). J. R. R. Tolkien: Artist and Illustrator. Illustrated by J. R. R. Tolkien. Boston: Houghton Mifflin. ISBN 0-395-74816-X.
- Hammond, Wayne G.; Scull, Christina (2005). The Lord of the Rings: A Reader's Companion. Houghton Mifflin. ISBN 978-0-00-720907-1.
- Tolkien, J. R. R. (1954a). The Fellowship of the Ring. The Lord of the Rings. Boston: Houghton Mifflin. OCLC 9552942.
- Tolkien, J. R. R. (1955). The Return of the King. The Lord of the Rings. Boston: Houghton Mifflin. OCLC 519647821.
- Tolkien, J. R. R. (1977). Christopher Tolkien (ed.). The Silmarillion. Boston: Houghton Mifflin. ISBN 978-0-395-25730-2.
- Tolkien, J. R. R. (1980). Christopher Tolkien (ed.). Unfinished Tales. Boston: Houghton Mifflin. ISBN 978-0-395-29917-3.
- Tolkien, J. R. R. (1987). Christopher Tolkien (ed.). The Lost Road and Other Writings. Boston: Houghton Mifflin. ISBN 0-395-45519-7.
- Tolkien, J. R. R. (1994). Christopher Tolkien (ed.). The War of the Jewels. Boston: Houghton Mifflin. ISBN 0-395-71041-3.
- Tolkien, J. R. R. (1996). Christopher Tolkien (ed.). The Peoples of Middle-earth. Boston: Houghton Mifflin. ISBN 978-0-395-82760-4.
