= Noldor =

Group of Elves in Tolkien's Middle-earth

In-universe information
- Other names: High Elves; Tatyar
- Created by: Eru Ilúvatar
- Creation date: First Age
- Home world: Middle-earth
- Language: Quenya
- Leader: Kings (in Valinor); High King (in Middle-earth)

In the works of J. R. R. Tolkien, the Noldor (also spelled Ñoldor, meaning those with knowledge in his constructed language Quenya) are a kindred of Elves who migrate west to the blessed realm of Valinor from the continent of Middle-earth, splitting from other groups of Elves as they went. They then settle in the coastal region of Eldamar. The Dark Lord Morgoth murders their first leader, Finwë. The majority of the Noldor, led by Finwë's eldest son Fëanor, then return to Beleriand in the northwest of Middle-earth. This makes them the only group to return and then play a major role in Middle-earth's history; much of The Silmarillion is about their actions. They are the second clan of the Elves in both order and size, the other clans being the Vanyar and the Teleri.

Among Elves, the Noldor show the greatest talents for intellectual pursuits, technical skills and physical strength, yet are prone to unchecked ambition and pride in their ability to create. Scholars such as Tom Shippey have commented that these attributes lead to their decline and fall, especially through Fëanor who creates and covets the magical jewels, the Silmarils. Others including Dimitra Fimi have linked the Noldor to the mythical Irish warriors and sorcerers, the Tuatha Dé Danann.

== Etymology and origins ==
"Noldor" or "Ñoldor" means those who have great knowledge and understanding. The Noldor are called Golodhrim or Gódhellim in Sindarin, and Goldui by another kindred of Elves, the Teleri of Tol Eressëa. The singular form of the Quenya noun is Noldo and the adjective is Noldorin, which is also the name of their dialect of Quenya. (Note: Tolkien 1994, part 4, "Quendi and Eldar" C: The Clan-names "Noldor")

In early drafts of his legendarium, Tolkien used the name "Gnomes" for the group later called the Noldor, and their language, the Noldorin dialect of Sindarin, was called "Gnomish" or "Noldorin". Tolkien had chosen "gnome" thinking that it derived from the Greek γνῶσις, gnōsis (knowledge), and hence was a good name for the wisest of the elves. However, because of its common association with garden gnomes, Tolkien abandoned the term.

== Attributes ==
The Noldor are counted among the Calaquendi ("Elves of the Light") or High Elves, as they had seen the light of the Two Trees of Valinor. The most distinctive aspect of Noldorin culture is their fondness for craftwork and skill of their workmanship, which ranges from lapidary to embroidery to the craft of language. Among the Elven kindreds, the Noldor are the most beloved by the Vala Aulë, who originally taught them craftsmanship. As a result of their renown as the most skilled of all peoples in lore, warfare and crafts, the Noldor are sometimes called the "Deep Elves". Following their return to Middle-earth at the start of the First Age, the Noldor build great cities within their realms in the land of Beleriand, such as Nargothrond and Gondolin. (Note: Tolkien 1977, ch. 15 "Of the Noldor in Beleriand")

When the Noldor are in Valinor they speak Quenya; in Middle-earth they also speak Sindarin. Among the wisest of the Noldor is Rúmil, creator of the first writing system, Sarati, and author of many books of lore. Fëanor, son of Finwë and Míriel, is the greatest of their craftsmen, "mightiest in skill of word and of hand", (Note: Tolkien 1977, ch. 5 "Of Eldamar and the Princes of the Eldalië") and creator of the Silmarils. Fëanor also devised the Tengwar script.

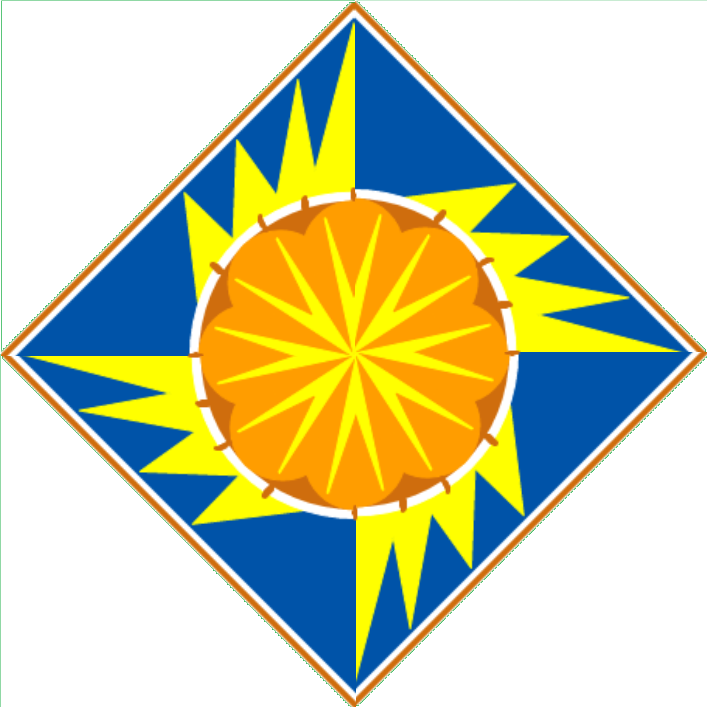
Emblem of Finwë, King of the Noldor, his highest of ranks signified in Elvish heraldry by sixteen points touching the rim

Tolkien gave some Noldorin leaders like Finwë and Fingolfin their own heraldic devices, carefully distinguishing their ranks by the number of points touching the rim.

The Noldor are the proudest of the Elves, as they vaunt in particular their ability to create: in the words of the Sindar, "they needed room to quarrel in". (Note: Tolkien 1994, Part 4, "Quendi and Eldar") Equally, this causes in them an arrogance that plagues their history and causes them great suffering.

The Noldor are tall and physically strong. Their hair colour is usually a very dark shade of brown; Tolkien hesitated over whether their hair might be black. (Note: Tolkien 1996, part 2, Late Writings (1968 or later): "The Shibboleth of Fëanor", p. 365, note 61) Red and even white ("silver") hair occasionally exists among some individuals. Their eyes are usually grey or dark, with the inner light of Valinor reflected in their eyes; the Sindarin term Lachend means "flame-eyed".

== Fictional history ==
=== Early history ===
Arda in the First Age. The Elves awaken at Cuiviénen, on the Sea of Helcar (right) in Middle-earth, and migrate westwards towards Valinor in Aman, some not arriving there. Fëanor's people of the Noldor, return to Beleriand (top) in stolen Falmari ships, leaving an angry Fingolfin to return over the Grinding Ice. Locations are diagrammatic.

The Silmarillion tells the history of the Noldor. The Elves are placed, asleep, in Cuiviénen on Middle-earth by the creator, Ilúvatar. According to Elven-lore, the Noldor as a clan is founded by Tata, the second Elf to awaken, his spouse Tatië and their 54 companions. The fate of Tata and Tatië is not recorded; it is Finwë who leads the Noldor to Valinor, where he becomes their King, and their chief dwelling-place is the city of Tirion upon Túna. In Valinor "great became their knowledge and their skill; yet even greater was their thirst for more knowledge, and in many things they soon surpassed their teachers. They were changeful in speech, for they had great love of words, and sought ever to find names more fit for all things they knew or imagined."

The Noldor draw the ire of the rogue Vala Melkor, who envies their prosperity and, most of all, the Silmarils crafted by Fëanor. So he often goes among them, offering advice, and the Noldor listen, being eager for knowledge. (Note: Tolkien 1977, ch. 6 "Of Fëanor and the Unchaining of Melkor") (Note: Tolkien 1977, ch. 7 "Of the Silmarils and the Unrest of the Noldor") But Melkor sows lies, and in the end the peace in Tirion is poisoned. Fëanor, having assaulted his half-brother Fingolfin and thus broken the laws of the Valar, is banished to his fortress Formenos, and with him goes Finwë his father. Fingolfin remains as the ruler of the Noldor of Tirion.

With the aid of the spider spirit Ungoliant, Melkor destroys the Two Trees of Valinor, (Note: Tolkien 1977, ch. 8 "Of the Darkening of Valinor") slays Finwë, steals the Silmarils and departs from Aman. Driven by vengeance, Fëanor rebels against the Valar and rouses the Noldor to leave Valinor, follows Melkor to Middle-earth and wages war against him for the recovery of the Silmarils. Though the greater part of the Noldor still hold Fingolfin as the rightful leader, they follow Fëanor out of kinship and to avenge Finwë. Fëanor and his sons swear an oath of vengeance against Melkor (whom Fëanor renames Morgoth) or anyone who comes into possession of a Silmaril. (Note: Tolkien 1977, ch. 9 "Of the Flight of the Noldor") (Note: Tolkien 1993, pp. 194, 294)

=== Flight of the Noldor: exile to Middle-earth ===
In the port city of Alqualondë, the Noldor hosts led by Fëanor demand that the Falmari, those of the Teleri who had come to Valinor, let them use their ships. When the Teleri refuse, Fëanor's forces take the ships by force, committing the first Kinslaying. A messenger from the Valar comes later and delivers the Prophecy of the North, pronouncing the Doom of Mandos on the Noldor for the Kinslaying, and warning that a grim fate awaits them should they proceed with their rebellion. Some of the Noldor who had had no hand in the Kinslaying, including Finarfin, son of Finwë and Indis, return to Valinor, and the Valar forgive them. The majority of the Noldor, some blameless for the Kinslaying, remain determined to leave Valinor for Middle-earth. Among them are Finarfin's children, Finrod and Galadriel, who choose to follow Fingolfin instead of Fëanor and his sons. (Note: Tolkien 1977, ch. 13 "Of the Return of the Noldor")

The Noldor cross the sea to Middle-earth in the stolen ships, leaving Fingolfin and his people behind. Upon his arrival in Middle-earth, Fëanor has the ships burned. When the Noldor led by Fingolfin discover their betrayal, they go far to the north and cross the sea at the Grinding Ice or Helcaraxë. Suffering substantial losses along the way, this greatly adds to their animosity for Fëanor and his sons. The deaths of the Two Trees and the departure of the Noldor out of the Undying Lands mark the end of the Years of the Trees, and the beginning of the Years of the Sun, when the Valar create the Moon and the Sun out of Telperion's last flower and Laurelin's last fruit. Fëanor's company is soon attacked by Morgoth in the Battle under Stars or Dagor-nuin-Giliath. Fëanor himself is mortally wounded by Balrogs, who had issued forth from Morgoth's fortress of Angband and captured his eldest son Maedhros.

Fingon, the eldest son of Fingolfin, saves Maedhros (his half-cousin) from captivity, which settles the rift between their houses for a time. Maedhros is due to succeed Fëanor, but he regrets his part in the Kinslaying as well as the abandonment of Fingolfin, and leaves the leadership of the Noldor in Middle-earth to his uncle Fingolfin, who becomes High King of the Noldor. Maedhros's brothers dissent and begin to call themselves the Dispossessed, paying little deference to Fingolfin or his successors, and are still determined to fulfil the oath they swore to recover the Silmarils on behalf of their father.

In Beleriand, in the north-west of Middle-earth, the Noldor make alliances with the Sindar and later with Men of the Three Houses of the Edain. Fingolfin reigns long in the land of Hithlum, and his younger son Turgon builds the hidden city of Gondolin. The Sons of Fëanor rule the lands in Eastern Beleriand, while Finrod Finarfin's son is the King of Nargothrond and his brothers Angrod and Aegnor hold Dorthonion. Fingolfin's reign is marked by warfare against Morgoth; in the year 60 of the First Age, after their victory in the battle of Dagor Aglareb, the Noldor start the Siege of Angband, the great fortress of Morgoth. In 455 the siege is broken by Morgoth in the Dagor Bragollach, or Battle of Sudden Flame, in which the north-eastern Elvish realms are conquered, with the exception of Maedhros' fortress at Himring. A man, Barahir, saves Finrod's life; Finrod gives him a ring which had been made in Valinor. (Note: The ring survives in Rivendell. In the Third Age, the Ring of Barahir passes to Aragorn, who gives it to Arwen when they are betrothed.) Fingolfin in despair rides to Angband and challenges Morgoth to single combat, dealing the Dark Lord seven wounds before perishing. Fingolfin is succeeded by his eldest son Fingon the Valiant, who becomes the second High King of the Noldor in Beleriand.

In 472, Maedhros organises an attack on Morgoth, which leads to the Nírnaeth Arnoediad, the Battle of Unnumbered Tears. (Note: Tolkien 1977, ch. 20 "Of the Fifth Battle: Nirnaeth Arnoediad") The Noldor and their allies are utterly defeated when they are betrayed by the Easterlings and surrounded by Morgoth's forces. Fingon is killed by Gothmog the Lord of Balrogs, and is succeeded by his brother Turgon. Morgoth scatters the remaining forces led by the sons of Fëanor, and in 495 Nargothrond too is conquered. Turgon had already withdrawn to Gondolin, which had been kept hidden from both Morgoth and other Elves; his realm is betrayed to Morgoth by his nephew Maeglin in 510. Turgon dies during the Fall of Gondolin, though his daughter Idril leads many of his people to escape and find their way south. Gil-galad, son of Fingon, succeeds Turgon and becomes the fourth and last High King of the Noldor in Middle-earth. (Note: Tolkien 1977, ch. 23 "Of Tuor and the Fall of Gondolin")

Between 545 and 583, the War of Wrath is fought between Morgoth and the host of the Valar. As the result of the cataclysmic destruction from the war, Beleriand sinks into the sea, except for a part of Ossiriand later known as Lindon, and a few islands. The defeat of Morgoth marks the end of the First Age and the start of the Second, when most of the Noldor return to Aman, though some like Galadriel or Celebrimbor, grandson of Fëanor, refuse the pardon of the Valar and remain in Middle-earth. (Note: Tolkien 1977, ch. 24 "Of the Voyage of Eärendil and the War of Wrath")

=== Second and Third Ages ===
Gil-galad founds a new kingdom at Lindon and rules throughout the Second Age, longer than any of the High Kings before him. After Sauron re-emerges and manipulates Celebrimbor and the smiths of Eregion into forging the Rings of Power, he fortifies Mordor and begins the long war with the remaining Elves in Middle-earth. His forces attack Eregion, destroying it, but are repelled at Rivendell and Lindon. With the aid of the Númenóreans, the Noldor manage to defeat him for a time. (Note: Tolkien 1977 "Of the Rings of Power and the Third Age")

In the year 3319 of the Second Age, Sauron manipulates the Númenóreans and their King, Ar-Pharazôn, to rebel against the Valar. Númenor is destroyed. Elendil escapes to the mainland with his sons Anárion and Isildur, who establish the realms of Arnor and Gondor. Gil-galad sets out for Mordor in the Last Alliance of Elves and Men with Elendil's forces and defeats Sauron in the Siege of Barad-dûr, though Gil-galad himself perishes with no successors as High King of the Noldor. Among the lineal descendants of Finwë in Middle-earth, only Galadriel and some Half-elven remain. (Note: Tolkien 1977, "Akallabêth")

In the Third Age, the Noldor in Middle-earth dwindle, and at the end of the Third Age the remaining Noldor depart to Valinor. In The Fellowship of the Ring Frodo meets a band of Elves led by Gildor Inglorion from the House of Finrod who are returning from a pilgrimage at the White Towers. (Note: Tolkien 1954a, book 1, ch. 3 "Three is Company")

== House of Finwë ==
House of Finwë family tree (Note: Tolkien 1977, "Of the Rings of Power and the Third Age": Family Tree I: "The house of Finwë and the Noldorin descent of Elrond and Elros") (Note: Tolkien 1977, "Of the Rings of Power and the Third Age": Family Tree II: "The descendants of Olwë and Elwë") (Note: Tolkien 1955, Appendix A: Annals of the Kings and Rulers, I The Númenórean Kings) (Note: Tolkien 1996, "The Shibboleth of Fëanor")

Míriel "broideress"	Finwë of the Noldor	Indis of the Vanyar
Fëanor, maker of Silmarils	Findis §	Fingolfin	Lalwen §	Finarfin
Maedhros	Five sons	Curufin	Fingon	Turgon	Aredhel	Argon §	Finrod	Angrod	Aegnor	Galadriel
Celebrimbor, maker of Rings	Idril	Maeglin	Orodreth ¶
Eärendil	Finduilas	Gil-galad ¶
Elros	Elrond	Celebrían
Aragorn	Arwen	Elladan	Elrohir
Eldarion

Colour key:
Colour	Description
	Elves
	Men
	Maiar
	Half-Elven
	Half-Elven who chose the fate of Elves
	Half-Elven who chose the fate of mortal Men

Kings of the Noldor in Valinor

High Kings of the Noldor in exile in Middle-earth

§ These figures do not appear in the published Silmarillion. The family tree as presented follows Tolkien's late note The Shibboleth of Fëanor.

¶ In the published Silmarillion, Orodreth is Finarfin's second son (and still Finduilas' father), and Gil-galad is Fingon's son.

The Sons of Fëanor are (in the order of their birth) Maedhros, Maglor, Celegorm, Curufin, Caranthir, Amras, and Amrod.

The Tolkien scholar Tom Shippey comments that the family tree of the House of Finwë is "essential", as Tolkien allocates character by ancestry; thus, Fëanor is pure Noldor, and so excellent as a craftsman, but his half-brothers Fingolfin and Finarfin have Vanyar blood from their mother, Indis. They are accordingly less skilful as craftsmen, but superior "in restraint and generosity".

== Analysis ==
=== Tuatha Dé Danaan ===
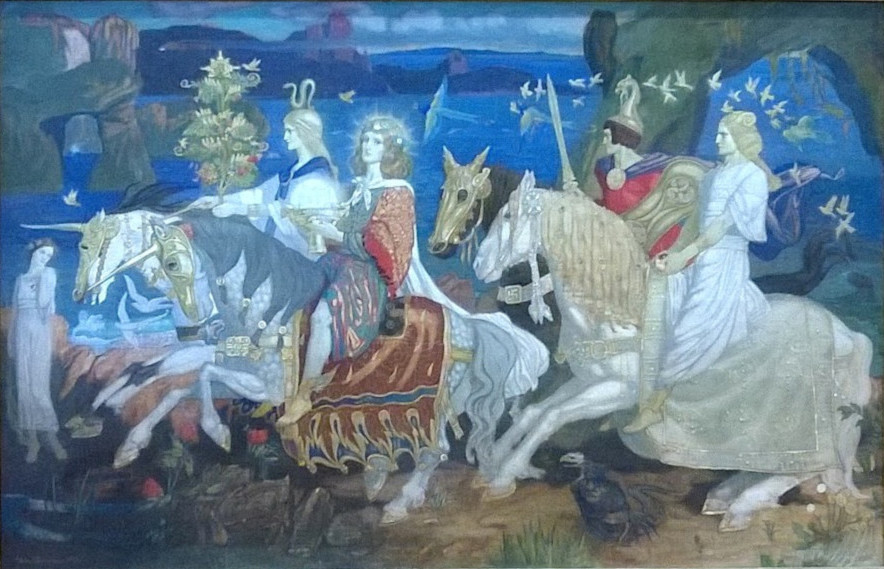
The Tuatha Dé Danann depicted in John Duncan's 1911 Riders of the Sidhe

Scholars including Dimitra Fimi, Anne Kinniburgh, and John Garth have connected the Noldor with the Irish Tuatha Dé Danaan as a possible influence. The parallels are both thematic and direct. In Irish mythology, the Tuatha Dé Danaan invade Ireland as a tall pale fair-haired race of immortal warriors and sorcerers. They have godlike attributes but human social organisation. They enter Ireland with what Kinniburgh calls a "historical trajectory", entering in triumph, living with a high status, and leaving diminished, just as the Noldor do in Middle-earth. They are semi-divine as Sons of Danu, just as the Noldor are counted among the first of the sentient races, the Children of Ilúvatar. Their immortality keeps them from disease and the frailty of age, but not from death in battle, an exact parallel with the Noldor. Nuada Airgetlám, the Tuatha Dé Danaan's first high king, is killed by Balor of the Evil Eye; Fëanor is killed by Gothmog, Lord of Balrogs. Celebrimbor's (Note: Celebrimbor is a Noldo in some of Tolkien's versions, a Sinda in others.) name means "Silver Hand" in Sindarin, the same meaning as Nuada's epithet Airgetlám in Irish Gaelic. Celebrimbor's making of powerful but dangerous rings, too, has been linked with the finding of a curse on a ring at the temple of Nodens, a Roman god whom Tolkien in his work as a philologist identified with Nuada. Like Nuada, Maedhros loses a hand.

=== Germanic influence ===
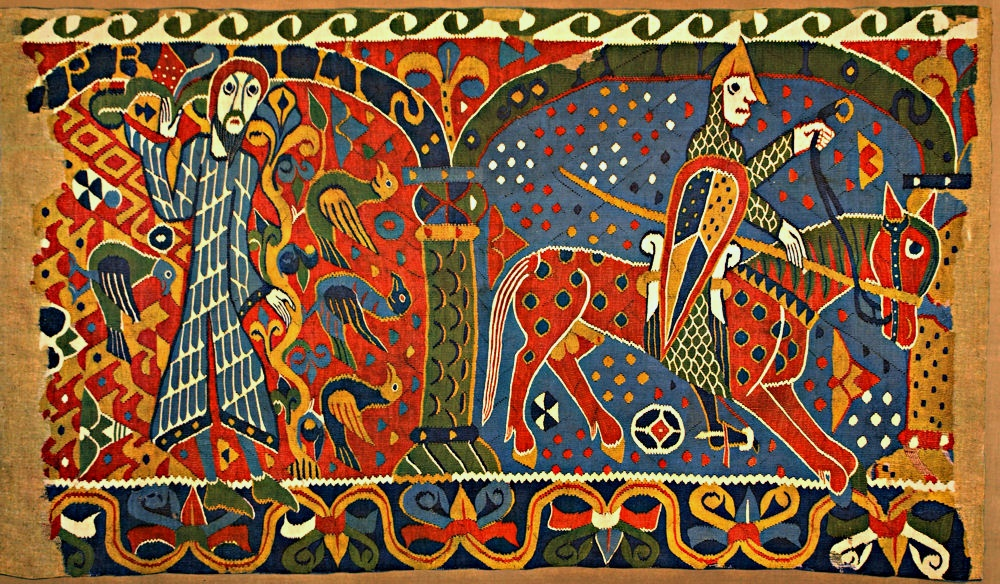
The Noldor have skill in weaving and needlework through Finwë's marriage to Míriel. Tolkien was aware that Germanic women were called weavers or embroiderers. Baldishol Tapestry pictured.

The Tolkien scholar Leslie A. Donovan notes that Tolkien's concept of exile, as principally exemplified by the Noldor, derives in part from Anglo-Saxon culture, in which he was an expert.

The medievalist Elizabeth Solopova makes a connection between Middle English and Tolkien's description of Finwë's first wife Míriel as the most skilful of the Noldor at weaving and needlework; Solopova notes that Tolkien had proposed an etymology for the Middle English term burde, meaning lady or damsel, linking it to Old English borde, embroidery, and that he had given examples from both Old English and Old Norse where women were called weavers or embroiderers.

=== Sub-creation ===
Shippey writes that Tolkien was himself fascinated with artefacts and their "sub-creation". He comments that in The Hobbit, The Lord of the Rings, and The Silmarillion, Tolkien consistently chooses to write about the "restless desire to make things". This is not quite, he notes, the same as the Christian sin of avarice or possessiveness. This made sense in the case of the Noldor, as for consistency their besetting sin ought not to be the same as Adam and Eve's, which was pride. In Valinor, Shippey writes, the equivalent of the Fall "came when conscious creatures became 'more interested in their own creations than in God's'", with Fëanor's forging of the Silmarils. He adds that the smith-Vala Aulë is not only the patron of all craftsmen but the Vala most like Melkor, the first Dark Lord. The kinds of craftsmanship he encouraged among the Noldor was not only of physical things, but "'those that make not, but seek only for the understanding of what is' — the philologists, one might say", writes Shippey, including Tolkien's profession along with the Noldor's skill with letters and poetry.

=== Decline and fall ===
The Tolkien scholar Bradford Lee Eden states that in The Silmarillion, Tolkien focused on the Noldor as their history is "filled with the doom and fate so typical of medieval literature that determines the entire history of Middle-earth from the First Age to the time of The Lord of the Rings." He notes that in many "parallel stories and tales" the fates of Elves and Men are tightly interwoven, leading inexorably to the decline and fading of the Elves and the rise of Men as the dominant race in the modern Earth. The Tolkien scholar Matthew Dickerson writes that the theft of the Silmarils by Morgoth leads Fëanor and his sons into swearing their dreadful oath and leading the Noldor out of Valinor back to Middle-earth. This is, he comments, at once a free choice and a self-imposed exile.

=== Colonialism ===
The Swedish archaeologist Martin Rundkvist writes that Tolkien's account of Finrod Felagund includes "a transparently colonial passage" where the Elf, having arrived in a new country, "immediately takes up the White Man's Burden and spends a year educating the humans about his religious beliefs ('true knowledge'). They think this is great and become his feudal subjects. Then to avoid conflict with the Green-elves he re-settles the new arrivals in a thinly populated area ruled by some of his relatives."

== In culture ==
Nightfall in Middle-Earth, a 1998 studio album by the German power metal band Blind Guardian, contained multiple references to the Noldor and the events they experience within the narrative of The Silmarillion. For example, "Face the Truth" has Fingolfin tell how he crossed the icy Helcaraxë, while in "Noldor (Dead Winter Reigns)" he regrets having left Valinor; "Battle of Sudden Flame" recalls the battle of Dagor Bragollach, which marked the turning point of the Noldor's war against Morgoth in the Dark Lord's favour; "The Dark Elf" recounts the birth of Maeglin, the son of Fingolfin's daughter Aredhel and Eöl the titular Dark Elf; "Nom the Wise" is an elegy by Beren to his friend Finrod Felagund. The Tolkien scholar Bradford Lee Eden writes that "although one can assume that Tolkien was not a headbanger", he finds that in the opinion of his students, the "driving energy" of the power metal sound is appropriate for the stories: "The music conveys rage and despair, which fits lyrics such as 'The doom of the Noldor drew near/ The words of a banished king, “I swear revenge!”'" Eden adds that this facilitates discussion of Tolkien's Christian view of the fall of man.
