= Heraldry of Middle-earth =

Component of Tolkien's writings

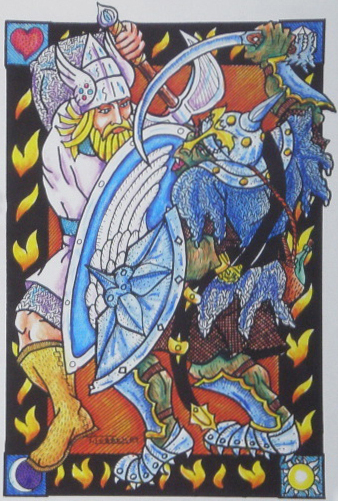
Tuor bears a blue shield emblazoned with the White Wing of his House in Gondolin. (Note: Tolkien 1984b, "The Fall of Gondolin" pp. 172–174)

J. R. R. Tolkien invented heraldic devices for many of the characters and nations of Middle-earth. His descriptions were in simple English rather than in specific blazon. The emblems correspond in nature to their bearers, and their diversity contributes to the richly detailed realism of his writings.

Scholars note that Tolkien went through different phases in his use of heraldry; his early account of the Elvish heraldry of Gondolin in The Book of Lost Tales corresponds broadly to heraldic tradition in the choice of emblems and colours, but that later when he wrote The Lord of the Rings he was freer in his approach, and in the complex use of symbols for Aragorn's sword and banner, he clearly departs from tradition to suit his storytelling.

In his The Lord of the Rings film trilogy, Peter Jackson and his concept designers took inspiration from traditional representations of men-at-arms on horseback with banners and armour, especially Albrecht Altdorfer's 1529 oil painting, The Battle of Alexander at Issus, to create realistic battle scenes.

== J. R. R. Tolkien ==
=== Rules of Elvish heraldry ===
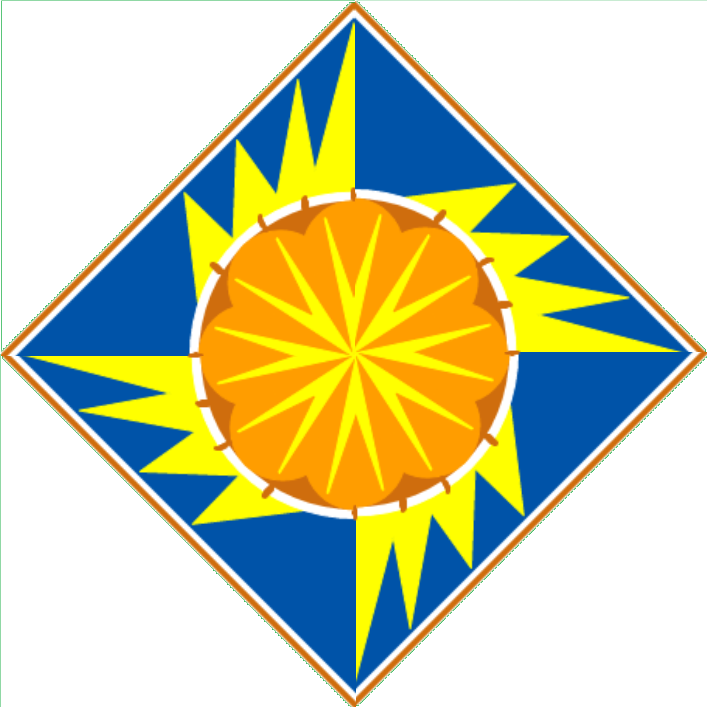
Lozenge of Finwë, High King of the Noldor, with sixteen points touching the rim

Lozenge of Feanor, his son. Its 4 points that reach the outer rim indicate that he was a prince.

The Tolkien scholars Wayne G. Hammond and Christina Scull describe Tolkien's graphic creativity, from doodles to Númenórean artefacts and Elvish emblems. Tolkien noted the rules of Elvish heraldry:

Rules of Tolkien's Elvish heraldry
Shape	Structure	Meaning
	Circle	for a female
	Lozenge	for a male
	Square	impersonal or for a family
	4 points reaching rim	for a Prince
	6–8 points reaching rim	for a King
	up to 16 points reaching rim	for a great ancestor, e.g. House of Finwë

One of Tolkien's drawings of emblems, for Lúthien Tinúviel, was used on the front cover of The Silmarillion, and another five (for Fingolfin, Eärendil, Idril Celebrindal, Elwë, and Fëanor) were used on the back cover. (Note: Tolkien 1977, Front and back cover)

=== Houses of Gondolin ===
According to The Book of Lost Tales, the active male Elves of Gondolin, a city in Beleriand in the First Age, belonged to one of the 11 "Houses" or Thlim, plus the bodyguard of Tuor, a Man, which was accounted the twelfth. Each house had a distinct symbol: a mole, a swallow, the heavens, a pillar, a tower of snow, a tree, a golden flower, a fountain, a harp, a hammer and anvil, and finally the triple symbol of the King, namely the moon, sun, and scarlet heart worn by the Royal Guard.

Hriban writes that the Gondolin emblems are simply figurative, depicting familiar objects, and that similar devices can be found in standard British texts on heraldry. (Note: Hriban cites Bernard Burke's General Armoury in the enlarged 1884 edition, John Woodward & George Burnett's 1892 Treatise on Heraldry, British and Foreign, and A. C. Fox-Davies' 1909 A Complete Guide to Heraldry as texts available when Tolkien was writing. He observes that at this stage in Tolkien's heraldry, the devices fit well into the heraldic canon.) He notes that Maeglin the traitor, of the House of Moles, fittingly has the colour black; like the animal, his people are miners, used to living underground in the dark.

Old Noldorin names of the Houses	Leader	Uniforms and emblems	Notes
The folk of the White Wing	Tuor	"These wore wings as it were of swans or gulls upon their helms, and the emblem of the White Wing was upon their shields." (Note: Tolkien 1984b "The Fall of Gondolin")	The bodyguard of Tuor.
The House of the Mole or the Thlim Doldrin	Maeglin	"Sable was their harness, and they bore no sign or emblem, but their round caps of steel were covered with moleskin."	Composed of skilled miners.
The House of the Swallow or the Thlim Duilin	Duilin	"[They] bore a fan of feathers on their helms, and they were arrayed in white and dark blue and in purple and black and showed an arrowhead on their shield."	Gondolin's best archers.
The House of the Heavenly Arch or the Thlim Quing Ilon	Egalmoth	"They were arrayed in a glory of colours, and their arms were set with jewels. Every shield of that battalion was of the blue of the heavens."	A very wealthy house; comprised the other part of Gondolin's archers.
The House of the Pillar or the Thlim Climbol	Penlod	unknown	Their leader was slain during the Fall of Gondolin.
The House of the Tower of Snow or the Thlim Ith Mindon	Penlod	unknown	Their leader was slain during the Fall of Gondolin.
The House of the Tree or the Thlim Galdon	Galdor	"Their raiment was green."	Wielded clubs and slings.
The House of the Golden Flower or the Thlim Losglóriol	Glorfindel	"[They] bore a golden flower upon their shield."	
The House of the Fountain or the Thlim Ecthel	Ecthelion	"Silver and diamonds was their delight; and swords very long and bright and pale did they wield."	The guard of the fountains, primarily those of the king. Warriors of this house defended the seventh gate of Gondolin. They marched into battle to the playing of flutes.
The House of the Harp or the Thlim Salum	Salgant	"A harp of silver shone in their blazonry upon a field of black."	House of musicians. However, their leader was a craven.
The House of the Hammer of Wrath or the Thlim Gothodrum	Rog	"The sign of this people was the Stricken Anvil, and a hammer that smiteth sparks about it was set on their shields."	The largest and most valiant house. They comprised those blacksmiths who were not under Maeglin, as well as escaped thralls of Morgoth. They perished to the last elf during the Fall of Gondolin.
The House of the King	King Turgon	"The array of the house of the king and their colours were white and gold and red, and their emblems the moon and the sun and the scarlet heart [of Finwë Nólemë]."	The three Royal Guard battalions of King Turgon.

=== Maiar ===
Arms	Person	Emblem	Comments
	Gandalf the Grey	The Cirth rune for the letter "G" on a grey field.	Gandalf indicates his presence on Weathertop by scratching his rune on a stone. The mark is simple, hard to distinguish from mere scratches. (Note: Tolkien 1954a, book 1, ch 11, "A Knife in the Dark")
	Saruman the White	The Cirth rune for the letter "S" on a white field. (Note: Tolkien 1954, book 3, ch. 1, "The Departure of Boromir") A white hand on a black field.	The "S" rune is Saruman's old symbol, standing simply for his name as a wizard. McGregor comments that white usually symbolises purity and goodness; Saruman was indeed the "White Wizard" and head of the Council of the Wise, and white was his colour; but when he changes allegiance he becomes "Saruman of Many Colours" complete with shimmering robes that "changed hue so that the eye was bewildered". (Note: Tolkien 1954a, book 2, ch 2, "The Council of Elrond") He adds that Saruman's colours, like his moral state, is thus seen to be broken, in contrast to Gandalf who is resurrected in "gleaming white" as "Saruman as he should have been". (Note: Tolkien 1954, book 3, ch. 5, "The White Rider") The White Hand symbol thus, in McGregor's view, hides Saruman's "betrayal and desertion of his true colours", though the dismembered limb has both the horrible pallor of a ghost and the isolated quality of the Evil Eye of Sauron. Unlike Sauron's eye, the open hand stands for honesty and friendship, echoing Saruman's continued attempt to appear to be on the side of good.
	Sauron, and his forces in Mordor	"A single banner, black but bearing on it in red the Evil Eye" (Note: Tolkien 1955, book 5, ch. 10, "The Black Gate Opens")	The readily recognisable symbol of the Dark Lord, "a synecdoche for Sauron himself"

=== Men ===
Hriban writes that in Tolkien's third heraldic phase, writing The Lord of the Rings, his choice of imagery is personal rather than canonical heraldry, suiting the demands of the narrative. Thus, Aragorn's motifs go beyond the heraldic canon; they are assembled in a "multilayered iconography" that symbolises the reunification of the Kingdoms of Arnor and Gondor: his sword, Andúril, is "forged anew" (itself a symbolic action, he observes) with "a device of seven stars set between the crescent Moon and the rayed Sun"; he glosses the stars as Elendil's, the Sun as perhaps Anarion's, and the Moon as presumably Isildur's.

Arms	Realm	Emblem	Comments
	Dol Amroth (princedom)	"the Ship and the Silver Swan"; (Note: Tolkien 1955, book 5, ch. 1 "Minas Tirith") "the swan-knights of Dol Amroth with their Prince and his blue banner at their head" (Note: Tolkien 1955, book 5, ch. 4 "The siege of Gondor")	McGregor comments that Imrahil, Prince of Dol Amroth has a "less exalted" emblem than the White Tree of Gondor, but that the "gilded banner" achieves "a similar effect"; like the White Tree, too, it is "distinctively Elvish" in character.
	Gondor (Stewards) (in absence of King)	White, without charge	The Stewards "bore a white rod only as the token of their office", while "their banner was white without charge" in contrast to the Royal banner. (Note: Tolkien 1955, Appendix A) McGregor comments that this "strangely virginal plainness" is complementary to the royal insignia, reflecting the plain white shield of an "untried knight".
	Gondor	"a great standard was spread in the breeze, and there a white tree flowered upon a sable field beneath a shining crown and seven glittering stars" (Note: Tolkien 1955, book 6, ch. 10 "The Field of Cormallen")	McGregor remarks that the emblems of Gondor are "marked by a beauty and nobility .. associated with an all but vanished past". He notes that the symbol is connected all the way back to the Two Trees of Valinor "or Paradise". At a crucial moment in the Battle of the Pelennor Fields, the "evident majesty of Aragorn's royal standard" is unfurled: "upon the foremost ship a great standard broke, and the wind displayed it as she turned towards the Harlond. There flowered a White Tree, and that was for Gondor; but Seven Stars were about it, and a high crown above it, the signs of Elendil that no lord had borne for years beyond count. And the stars flamed in the sunlight, for they were wrought of gems by Arwen daughter of Elrond; and the crown was bright in the morning, for it was wrought of mithril and gold." (Note: Tolkien 1955, book 5, ch. 6 "The Battle of the Pelennor Fields")
	Harad	A coiled black snake on a red field (Note: Tolkien 1954, book 4 ch 4, "Of Herbs and Stewed Rabbit")	McGregor comments that Tolkien presents the Haradrim as "a race of fierce barbarians, threatening and dangerous but, being human, neither completely other nor intrinsically evil". In his view, their emblem reflects this, as the colours red and black are the same as Mordor's, swapped so that red is the field, suggesting "'southern' heat and passion", unpleasant but certainly human qualities, while the serpent, though symbolising evil in Christianity, is also a living creature, unlike Sauron's "disembodied eye". Hriban states that the Haradrim's red upon black is the sole instance of armes fausses, breaking the rule of never putting "colour upon colour or metal upon metal" in The Lord of the Rings, indicating the southern chieftain's "ignorance and disdain" for the heraldic customs of his neighbours.
	Minas Morgul (Undead)	On a black field a skull within a crescent moon	McGregor comments that the Nazgûl, Kings of Men consumed by Rings of Power and now Ringwraiths, Sauron's most terrible servants, have taken over the Moon symbol of the city of Minas Ithil, disfiguring it with "a ghastly face of death", (Note: Tolkien 1955, book 6, ch. 1 "The Tower of Cirith Ungol") its corruption accurately reflecting the fate of the once beautiful city. In his view the emblem must have been a white figure on a black field.
	Rohan	"white on green, a great horse running free"	McGregor calls the emblem, like those of Gondor and Dol Amroth, an "organic and natural symbol", opposed to the Eye of Mordor and White Hand of Isengard. The horse is moreover an energetic animal, and an essential part of Rohan's history and character, its green field reflecting the grassy landscape of the country, and its places of battle.

== Peter Jackson ==
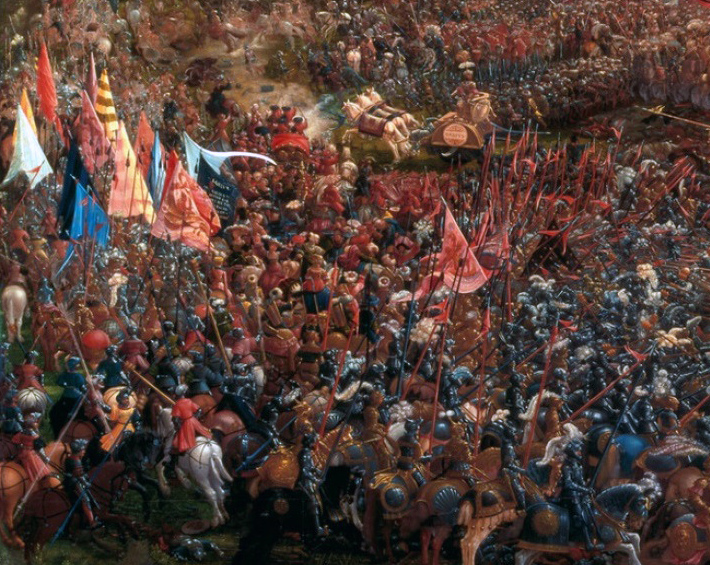
Detail of Albrecht Altdorfer's 1529 oil painting The Battle of Alexander at Issus

In his The Lord of the Rings film trilogy, Peter Jackson and his concept designers took inspiration from traditional representations of men-at-arms on horseback with banners and armour. Jackson mentioned in particular Albrecht Altdorfer's 1529 oil painting, The Battle of Alexander at Issus, depicting the events of 333 BC. Jackson personally drove this realistic approach, saying: "Imagine this: 7,000 years has gone by... Rohan heraldry is studied and faithfully reproduced. Théoden's original saddle is in a museum – far too valuable to use in the movie, but an exact copy is made". Richard Taylor, creative director of Weta Workshop, responsible for manufacturing weapons and equipment, stated that he insisted on "invest[ing] the props with a high level of richness and heraldry and realism".

== Analysis ==
The scholar of English Jamie McGregor writes that the heraldic emblems described by J. R. R. Tolkien are associated with symbols used in The Lord of the Rings; some are readily apparent to the reader, such as the "Evil Eye" used by the Dark Lord Sauron, while others need closer analysis to reveal their significance. He comments that first-time readers may notice the descriptions of emblems simply as part of the rich detailing of Middle-earth, but that closer attention reveals an accurate match between the symbols and the "histories and cultures, the allegiances, characters and natures, of those who bear them".

Margaret R. Purdy, writing in Mythlore, states that the Elvish emblems (as opposed to those used by Men in The Silmarillion), use rules similar to European heraldry, but with more freedom, for example in the use of colour. She notes that there are some puzzles, as with the emblem of Finwë, a winged sun: since the sun had not been created when he lived, the emblem must have been devised posthumously, just as medieval heralds created arms for the first man, Adam. However, Hammond and Scull note that Tolkien created this heraldic device after deciding in favour of the Round World version of the cosmology, according to which the Sun existed during Finwë's lifetime.

Catalin Hriban comments that although Tolkien makes only light use of heraldry, he transformed it "into a mythographer's tool and artifice, like all the rest of [the] primary-world cultural items that are woven into the Tolkienian cosmos". He adds that "the heraldic rules and visual canon are treated with the same philologist's care as the vocabulary and grammar rules of his created languages".

Hriban states that in The Hobbit, written for children, the banners are simplified to plain colours. Tolkien uses green for the Wood-Elves, blue for the Men of Lake-town (Esgaroth) on the good side; red and black for the goblins or Orcs of the bad side. Hriban notes that Tolkien continues the association of these colours with good and evil into The Lord of the Rings.

Agnieszka Żurek, writing in The Heraldry Society's journal, notes that Tolkien mentions heraldry in the form of emblems, banners, and shields in many places in his Middle-earth writings, spanning The Hobbit, The Lord of the Rings, and the posthumously published The Silmarillion, Unfinished Tales, and the 12 volumes of The History of Middle-earth.

== See also ==
- Tolkien's artwork#The Silmarillion
