= Finwë and Míriel =

Middle-earth characters

Finwë
- Tolkien character

In-universe information
- Race: Elves
- Title: King of the Noldor
- Book(s): The Silmarillion (1977)

Míriel
- Tolkien character

In-universe information
- Aliases: Þerindë, Serindë, Fíriel
- Race: Elves
- Book(s): The Silmarillion (1977)

Finwë (Quenya: [ˈfinwɛ]) and Míriel (Quenya: [ˈmiːriɛl]) are fictional characters from J. R. R. Tolkien's legendarium. Finwë is the first King of the Noldor Elves; he leads his people on the journey from Middle-earth to Valinor in the blessed realm of Aman. His first wife is Míriel, who, uniquely among immortal Elves, dies while giving birth to their only child Fëanor, creator of the Silmarils; her spirit later serves the godlike Vala queen Vairë. Finwë is the first person to be murdered in Valinor: he is killed by the Dark Lord Morgoth, who is intent on stealing the Silmarils. The event sets off the Flight of the Noldor from Valinor back to Beleriand in Middle-earth, and its disastrous consequences.

Tolkien commented on the importance of the story of Finwë and Míriel on his legendarium, stating that had Finwë chosen differently, the whole course of Middle-earth's history would have been better. Tolkien called Míriel's decision to let go of life disastrous; he associated it with the Biblical Fall of man. Scholars have debated whether Finwë and Míriel were to blame for the subsequent disastrous history of the Elves in Middle-earth. They have remarked that Míriel was extremely skilful in craftsmanship, and passed on her skill to her son Fëanor, whose other name, Curufinwë, means "Skill-Finwë" in one of Tolkien's constructed languages, Quenya. They have commented, too, on the lasting consequences of Míriel's death, through Fëanor's uncontrolled and divisive actions.

== Fictional history ==
=== In Middle-earth ===
Arda in the First Age. The Elves awaken in Middle-earth (right). Elwë, Finwë, and Ingwë encourage their peoples to obey the call of the Valar and travel to Valinor (green arrows to the left), but some refuse, causing the first Sundering of the Elves. Finwë's killing by Melkor leads in turn to the Flight of the Noldor (red arrows to the right) back to Middle-earth.

Among the Elves who first awoke at Cuiviénen, a bay on the Sea of Helcar in the East of Middle-earth, the Noldor are the "Deep-Elves", always interested in knowledge, skill, and understanding; their leader is Finwë. The godlike Valar ask the Elves to come and live with them in their blessed realm of Valinor. The Elves are doubtful about this, so the Vala Oromë picks three leaders of the Elves, Elwë, Finwë, and Ingwë, to come and see Valinor for themselves. Delighted by what they see, the three ambassadors return to their people and invite them to make the journey to Valinor. The Fair-Elves of Ingwë go and stay; the Deep-Elves of Finwë go, but many later return to Middle-earth; while the Elves of Elwë are divided, and though they set out together, many do not complete the journey. The ambassadors become the Kings of their respective peoples. (Note: Tolkien 1977, ch. 3 "Of the Coming of the Elves and the Captivity of Melkor")

=== In Valinor ===
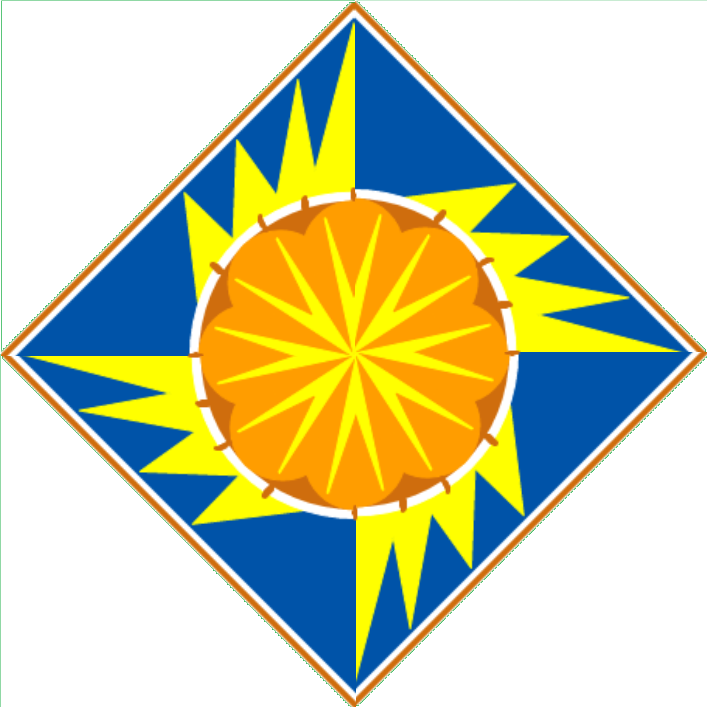
Lozenge of Finwë, King of the Noldor, with sixteen points touching the rim, indicating his rank in Elvish heraldry

Finwë marries Míriel, the most skilful of the Noldor in needlework and weaving. Míriel gives birth to their only child, Curufinwë, commonly called Fëanor; he inherits her skill, becoming the most gifted and brilliant of all the Noldor, the mightiest in crafts, especially the making of jewels. (Note: Tolkien 1977, ch. 5 "Of Eldamar and the Princes of the Eldalië")

Míriel, an immortal elf, is so exhausted by the birth, "consumed in spirit and body" by the fiery creative energy of her son Fëanor, that she wilfully gives up her spirit. She thus becomes the first sentient being in the blessed realm of Aman to experience death. This leaves Finwë on his own, not through his own choice; such a thing had never occurred before, and he chooses to remarry. (Note: Tolkien 1977, ch. 6 "Of Fëanor and the Unchaining of Melkor") His second wife is Indis of the Vanyar, the Fair-Elves of Ingwë. She bears him two sons: Fingolfin and Finarfin, and two daughters: Findis and Lalwen, their names echoing his. (Note: Tolkien 1996, "The Shibboleth of Fëanor")

Fëanor comes to resent Finwë's other sons, his half-brothers; there is constant strife between them. Fëanor makes the Silmarils, three star-like jewels that embody some of the light of the Two Trees of Valinor. (Note: Tolkien 1977, ch. 7 "Of the Silmarils and the Unrest of the Noldor") (Note: Tolkien 1993, pp. 205–271 "Laws and Customs among the Eldar")

During the Dark Lord Melkor's attempt to corrupt the Noldor, Finwë tries to exert a moderating influence over his people and lead them back to the Valar. When Fëanor is exiled from the Elvish city of Tirion after he openly threatens Fingolfin, Finwë goes with him to their northern fortress, Formenos. There he is the first to be murdered in Valinor when Melkor, seeking the Silmarils, kills him at the doors of Formenos. (Note: Tolkien 1977, ch. 9 "Of the Flight of the Noldor") This directly leads to the Flight of the Noldor, the disastrous rebellion of the Noldor against the Valar, which in turn leads the First Kinslaying, when Elves killed other Elves.

=== In the Halls of Mandos ===
After their deaths, Finwë and Míriel meet again in the Halls of Mandos, the place where the shades of dead Elves go in Aman. The Valar had allowed Finwë to remarry, given that Míriel had made clear she would never again live in a body; they did not want an Elf to have two living wives. As with Elves killed in battle, the Valar offer Finwë the choice to live again; he decides instead to let Míriel have this chance. Míriel feels that there is no longer a place for her among the Noldor, since Finwë had remarried, and declines the offer. She chooses to become an eternal assistant to Vairë, the weaver of the godlike Valar: she helps to weave the tapestries of time for the duration of the world's existence.

== Analysis ==
=== Creative power ===
Megan Fontenot, writing on Tor.com, notes that when Míriel says she will have no more children after the effort of having Fëanor, Finwë "becomes depressed", but ultimately gets the Vala Manwë to do as Míriel wishes, and let her go to the garden of Lórien, in the South of Aman, which is the realm of the Vala Irmo, the master of dreams. There she falls asleep and her spirit departs for the Halls of Mandos. Finwë visits her and calls her names, but she does not return. Fontenot comments that Tolkien's drafts of the tale of Míriel are complex. One strand of Tolkien's accounts of her tells that her needlework is so fine that just one piece would be worth more than a kingdom; Tolkien likens her creative power to that of the Vala Yavanna, she who loves all trees and plants that grow in the earth. In Fontenot's view, Míriel's creativity "celebrates and amplifies the beauty already present in the world around her. Her art doesn't hoard light and beauty". Further, Fontenot writes, it is significant that Yavanna made the Two Trees of Valinor, while Míriel made Fëanor, who made the Silmarils, which captured some of the light of the Two Trees.

=== Important choices ===
Some of Tolkien's drafts of the story describe similarities of character between Fëanor and Míriel. Tolkien calls both of them determined, hardly ever changing their mind once they had said they would do something. In another draft, Tolkien adds that Míriel was both "proud and obdurate"; the mention of pride directly echoes Fëanor's ill-fated oath.

Tolkien rewrote the tale of Finwë and Míriel several times, as it assumed "an extraordinary importance in [his] later work on The Silmarillion". The Silmarillion, prepared by Christopher Tolkien from his father's unpublished writings, only briefly mentions the tale of Finwë and Míriel; Tolkien may have intended to incorporate a fuller version. In Tolkien's works, Elves are immortal, their shades going to the Halls of Mandos after death, and marriage is forever. (Note: Tolkien 1993, pp. 209–213) Tolkien noted that had Finwë chosen differently, the whole history of Middle-earth would have changed for the better, thus making his choice a pivotal event in the mythology; it showed the importance Tolkien attached to unbreakable relationships.

=== Skill of mother and son ===
The Tolkien scholar Verlyn Flieger comments that Míriel's death has deep-running consequences through her son Fëanor's "unchecked nature". She notes that his usual name means "Spirit of Fire", and that it is not his true name, which is Curufinwë (Quenya: Curu, "Skill", and his father's name); in her view, the use of an epithet implies a strong emphasis on his fire element. The first thing his fire consumes is Míriel's body; The Silmarillion says she is "consumed in spirit and body". The poet and essayist Melanie Rawls writes that Fëanor's consuming nature, always taking things in, is "a negative-feminine trait", implying a disharmony of the genders. Flieger writes that his fire then drives his creativity, making the beautiful letters of the Fëanorian script, and jewels, including, fatefully, the Silmarils. She states that Tolkien, choosing his words very carefully, calls Fëanor two things. Firstly, he uses the word "subtle", by etymology from Latin sub-tela, "under the warp (of a weaving)", hence the crosswise weft threads that go against the grain, a dangerous part of the fabric of life. Secondly, he applies the word "skilled", by etymology from Indo-European skel-, "to cut", like the Noldor as a whole tending to cause division among the Elves. His choices, and the Silmarils, do in fact lead to division and war, to the Kinslaying of Elf by Elf, the theft of the Telerin Elves' ships in Aman, and in turn to further disasters across the sea in Beleriand.

Verlyn Flieger's analysis of Tolkien's choice of terms for Fëanor
Tolkien's terms	Etymology	Implications
"subtle"	Latin: sub-tela, "under the warp" of a weaving	A person who goes against the grain, dangerous
"skilled"	Indo-European skel-, "to cut"	A divisive person, one who causes conflict

Both Matthew Dickerson in The J. R. R. Tolkien Encyclopedia and Elizabeth Solopova in A Companion to J. R. R. Tolkien note that The Silmarillion emphasises Míriel's skill, naming her in early versions Byrde, later Serindë, "the broideress"; she passes on her "surpassing skill" in craftsmanship to her only son. Solopova suggests a possible link to Tolkien's study of the Middle English word burde, conventionally meaning "lady, damsel"; he proposed that it derived from Old English borde, "embroidery" and pointed out that in Old Norse and Old English poetry, stock terms for "woman" included "weaver" and "embroideress".

=== "A strange case" ===
Tolkien mentions in a letter "a strange case of an Elf (Míriel mother of Fëanor) that tried to die, which had disastrous results, leading to the 'Fall' of the High-elves"; he discusses it in the context of the Fall of Man. (Note: Carpenter 2023, Letters #212 to Rhona Beare, unsent draft continuation of #211 of 14 October 1958) Dickerson writes that while Fëanor is held responsible by the Valar, "neither Finwë nor Míriel is blameless". He states that no reason is given in The Silmarillion for Míriel's decision, beyond the enormous amount of energy, "enough for many children", that she put into Fëanor. However, he notes that Morgoth had already worked his evil on the Elves when they were still at Cuiviénen, where they first awakened, in the east of Middle-earth, sowing "the seeds of despair"; this might, he suggests, have contributed to Míriel's loss of hope. Tolkien wrote in Laws and Customs Among the Eldar that "Niënna came to Manwë, and she said: 'Lord of Aman, it is now made clear that the death of Míriel was an evil of Arda Marred, for with the coming hither of the Eldar the Shadow hath found an entrance even into Aman.'"

Fontenot notes that Tolkien's drafts differ widely in how long Míriel lives after Fëanor's birth, and hence in whether she can influence his ill humour directly. This in turn affects the issue of how far Finwë and Míriel can be blamed for the consequences of Fëanor's actions. It is a question that the Valar debate amongst themselves.

=== Philosophical themes ===
The scholar of religion Amelia Rutledge identifies what she calls Pauline constructs (like the language used by Paul the Apostle in the Bible) in the legalistic wording relating to the tale of Finwë and Míriel. She notes that Elizabeth Whittingham and Douglas Kane discuss instead the eschatology relating to the tale. Whittingham considers what she calls "some of the most interesting glimpses of Tolkien as sub-creator" in his stories and essays on the nature of mortal Men and immortal Elves, exploring the question of death and immortality raised by the voluntary death of Míriel. Kane discusses Mandos's Second Prophecy, with an illustration of "The spirit of Míriel appearing before Mandos and Manwë, and taking a last look at Finwë".

== House of Finwë ==
House of Finwë family tree (Note: Tolkien 1977, "Of the Rings of Power and the Third Age": Family Tree I: "The house of Finwë and the Noldorin descent of Elrond and Elros") (Note: Tolkien 1977, "Of the Rings of Power and the Third Age": Family Tree II: "The descendants of Olwë and Elwë") (Note: Tolkien 1955, Appendix A: Annals of the Kings and Rulers, I The Númenórean Kings)

Míriel "broideress"	Finwë of the Noldor	Indis of the Vanyar
Fëanor, maker of Silmarils	Findis §	Fingolfin	Lalwen §	Finarfin
Maedhros	Five sons	Curufin	Fingon	Turgon	Aredhel	Argon §	Finrod	Angrod	Aegnor	Galadriel
Celebrimbor, maker of Rings	Idril	Maeglin	Orodreth ¶
Eärendil	Finduilas	Gil-galad ¶
Elros	Elrond	Celebrían
Aragorn	Arwen	Elladan	Elrohir
Eldarion

Colour key:
Colour	Description
	Elves
	Men
	Maiar
	Half-Elven
	Half-Elven who chose the fate of Elves
	Half-Elven who chose the fate of mortal Men

Kings of the Noldor in Valinor

High Kings of the Noldor in exile in Middle-earth

§ These figures do not appear in the published Silmarillion. The family tree as presented follows Tolkien's late note The Shibboleth of Fëanor.

¶ In the published Silmarillion, Orodreth is Finarfin's second son (and still Finduilas' father), and Gil-galad is Fingon's son.
