= Fingolfin =

Fictional character in J. R. R. Tolkien's legendarium

- Tolkien character
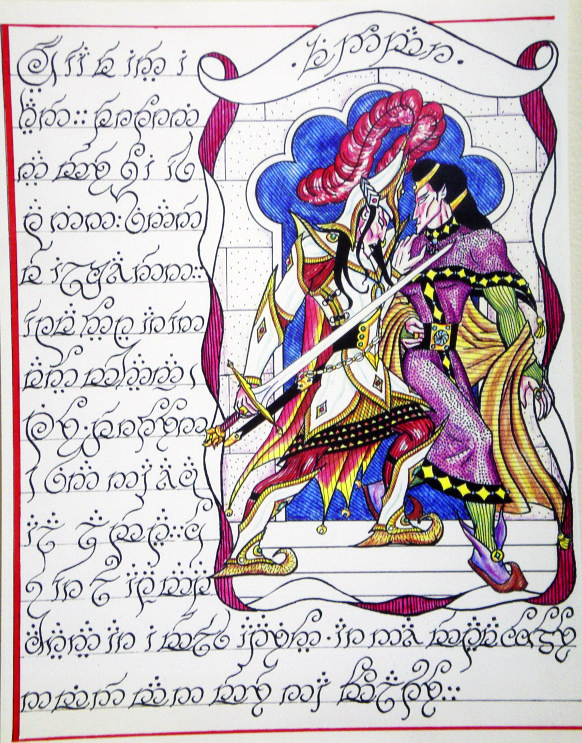
- Fëanor threatens Fingolfin illustration by Tom Loback

In-universe information
- Aliases: Nolofinwë, Aracáno
- Race: Elves
- Book(s): The Silmarillion

Fingolfin (Sindarin: [fiŋˈɡolfin]) is a character in J. R. R. Tolkien's legendarium, appearing in The Silmarillion. He was the son of Finwë, High King of the Noldor. He was threatened by his half-brother Fëanor, who held him in contempt for not being a pure-bred member of the Noldor. Even so, when Fëanor stole ships and left Aman, Fingolfin chose to follow him back to Middle-earth, taking the dangerous route over the ice of the Helcaraxë. On arrival, he challenged the Dark Lord Morgoth at the gates of his fortress, Angband, but Morgoth stayed inside. When his son Fingon rescued Maedhros, son of Fëanor, Maedhros gratefully renounced his claim to kingship, and Fingolfin became High King of the Noldor. He was victorious at the battle of Dagor Aglareb, and there was peace for some 400 years until Morgoth broke out and destroyed Beleriand in the Dagor Bragollach. Fingolfin, receiving false news, rode alone to Angband and challenged Morgoth to single combat. He wounded Morgoth several times, but grew weary and was killed by the immortal Vala.

Fingolfin has inspired artists, musicians and video game designers to create depictions of his deeds.

== Internal history ==
=== Birth ===
Fingolfin was the second son of Finwë, High King of the Noldor, a division of the Elves lower than the Vanyar but higher than the Teleri. He was full brother of Finarfin, and half-brother of Fëanor, who was the eldest of Finwë's sons. He founded the House of Fingolfin which ruled the Noldor in Middle-earth. His wife was Anairë and his children were Fingon, Turgon, Aredhel and Argon. (Note: Argon only appears in The Peoples of Middle-earth, Chapter 11 "The Shibboleth of Fëanor", and is left out of the published The Silmarillion.) (Note: Tolkien 1977, Chapter 5, "Of Eldamar and the Princes of the Eldalië") Fingolfin was said to be the strongest, most steadfast, and most valiant of Finwë's sons. His father-name in Quenya—one of Tolkien's fictional languages—was Nolofinwë, or "wise Finwë," while his mother-name was Aracáno, or "High Chieftain", the same name as his youngest son Argon. (Note: Tolkien 1996, Chapter 11 "The Shibboleth of Fëanor")

=== Strife with Fëanor ===
The mother of Fingolfin and Finarfin was Finwë's second wife, Indis; he married her after Míriel died. While they lived in Aman, there was always strife between the sons of Indis and Míriel's son Fëanor, mostly due to Melkor's treachery. However, Fingolfin would seek to forge a better relationship with Fëanor at every chance. Even after Fëanor threatened him with a sword and was banished from Tirion, Fingolfin forgave him and tried to mend their relationship. (Note: Tolkien 1977, Chapter 7, "Of the Silmarils and the Unrest of the Noldor") This occurred very soon before destruction of the Two Trees and the Darkening of Valinor. After this event and Fëanor's decision to leave Aman, Fingolfin chose to follow him into exile, so as not to abandon his people. (Note: Tolkien 1977, Chapter 9, "Of the Flight of the Noldor")

=== Crossing the ice of the Helcaraxë ===
Arda in the First Age. The Elves migrated westwards across Middle-earth and Belegaer, the great sea, to Valinor in Aman, dividing up as they went. Fingolfin fatefully chose to cross the dangerous ice of the Helcaraxë (top) between Aman and Beleriand to follow Fëanor back to Middle-earth.

Fingolfin led the largest host of the Noldor when they fled Aman for Middle-earth, even though he thought this unwise; he did not want to abandon his people to Fëanor. His followers participated in the Kinslaying at the Havens, but only because they arrived after the battle was underway not knowing that Fëanor was the aggressor. He led them across the ice of the Helcaraxë, an epic and arduous journey lasting many months, during which many of the people perished.

=== Challenging Morgoth at the gates of Angband ===
They arrived in Middle-earth at the first rising of the Moon, and sounded their trumpets. Soon after, at the first rising of the Sun, he came to the gates of Angband and smote upon them, but Melkor—now known as Morgoth—stayed hidden inside. Fingolfin and the Noldor then came to the northern shores of Lake Mithrim, from which the Fëanorian part of the host had withdrawn. (Note: Tolkien 1977, Chapter 13, "Of the Return of the Noldor")

=== High King of the Noldor ===
Fingolfin's son Fingon rescued Maedhros, son of Fëanor, who in gratitude waived his claim to kingship. Fingolfin thus became High King of the Noldor. He ruled from Hithlum, by the northern shores of Lake Mithrim.

After defeating the Orcs in the Dagor Aglareb, Fingolfin maintained the Siege of Angband for nearly 400 years. The Siege was ended by Morgoth's sudden assault in the Dagor Bragollach, the Battle of Sudden Flame, and many peoples of Beleriand fled. (Note: Tolkien 1977, Chapter 18, "Of the Ruin of Beleriand and the Fall of Fingolfin")

=== Death: single combat with Morgoth ===
When Fingolfin learned of this, and received false reports that his allies had been routed on all fronts, he became filled with wrath and despair. He immediately took his horse Rochallor and sword Ringil, and rode alone to Angband. All enemies fled from him, fearing his anger, and mistaking him in his fury for Oromë, the Vala patron of hunters.

Fingolfin smote the gates of Angband and challenged Morgoth to single combat. Though Morgoth feared Fingolfin (of all the Valar, Morgoth was the only one to know fear), he had to accept the challenge—or face shame in the eyes of his servants. Seven times Fingolfin wounded Morgoth and seven times Morgoth cried in pain, and seven times the host of Morgoth wailed in anguish, but he could not be slain for he was one of the Valar.

Whenever Morgoth attacked, Fingolfin avoided Morgoth's weapon Grond, the hammer of the underworld, as it cracked the ground so violently smoke and fire darted from the craters. Eventually, however, Fingolfin grew weary and stumbled on a crater. Then Morgoth pinned Fingolfin with his foot, and killed him, but not before he, with his last act of defiance, hewed at Morgoth's foot. Morgoth thenceforward always walked with a limp. Enraged, Morgoth sought to desecrate the body of the valiant king, but Thorondor, Lord of Eagles flew down, raked Morgoth's eyes, and carried Fingolfin's body away to be placed on a cliff overlooking Gondolin. Later, Fingolfin's son Turgon built a cairn over his father's remains.

== Artefacts ==
=== Heraldic device ===
Tolkien's design of heraldic device for Fingolfin. It has some similarity both with his father Finwë's and his brother Finarfin's devices, but in Elvish heraldry, the device is unique to the person. The eight points that reach the border indicate a High King.

Fingolfin is among those major characters such as Gil-galad whom Tolkien, who illustrated his own writings, supplied with a distinct heraldic device. Like his brother Finarfin's device, it has eight points that reach the edge of its lozenge, denoting a High King, and a central circle; it differs from Finarfin's in having a second concentric circle. Its colours are like those for his father Finwë's device, but as the Tolkien scholars Wayne G. Hammond and Christina Scull note, its eight curling points are more like those of Fëanor's. They write that the device's motif of small silver stars on a blue field is presumably related to his shield, which Tolkien described as "with field of heaven's blue and star / of crystal shining pale afar". Catherine McIlwaine, who curated the Bodleian Library exhibition of his artwork, wrote that Tolkien liked to create decorative patterns, leading up to pattern-based designs such as a carpet from Númenor. In her view, his creation of heraldic devices for characters in The Silmarillion was a more deliberate form of the same impulse. Among "the loveliest of these kaleidoscopic patterns", wrote McIlwaine, were the devices for Fingolfin and his brother Finarfin.

=== Family tree ===
The family tree shows that Fingolfin is half Noldor, from his father Finwë, and half Vanyar, from his mother Indis. Among his descendants are Gil-galad, Eärendil, and Elrond. His half-brother Fëanor is pure Noldor, by Finwë's other wife Miriel. (Note: Tolkien 1977, "Of the Rings of Power and the Third Age": Family Tree I: "The house of Finwë and the Noldorin descent of Elrond and Elros") (Note: Tolkien 1977, "Of the Rings of Power and the Third Age": Family Tree II: "The descendants of Olwë and Elwë") (Note: Tolkien 1955, Appendix A: Annals of the Kings and Rulers, I The Númenórean Kings) The Tolkien scholar Tom Shippey writes that in The Silmarillion, as in Norse tradition and sagas, people are defined by their ancestry. The Vanyar are the senior division of the Elves; so Fëanor's fourth son Caranthir is quite wrong to treat his father's half-brothers Finarfin and Fingolfin with contempt, something that was both dangerous and ill-founded. Shippey states that Caranthir's scornful words could be said to have set in motion the events which led to the ruin of Doriath.

House of Finwë family tree (Note: Tolkien 1996, "The Shibboleth of Fëanor")

Míriel "broideress"	Finwë of the Noldor	Indis of the Vanyar
Fëanor, maker of Silmarils	Findis §	Fingolfin	Lalwen §	Finarfin
Maedhros	Five sons	Curufin	Fingon	Turgon	Aredhel	Argon §	Finrod	Angrod	Aegnor	Galadriel
Celebrimbor, maker of Rings	Idril	Maeglin	Orodreth ¶
Eärendil	Finduilas	Gil-galad ¶
Elros	Elrond	Celebrían
Aragorn	Arwen	Elladan	Elrohir
Eldarion

Colour key:
Colour	Description
	Elves
	Men
	Maiar
	Half-Elven
	Half-Elven who chose the fate of Elves
	Half-Elven who chose the fate of mortal Men

Kings of the Noldor in Valinor

High Kings of the Noldor in exile in Middle-earth

§ These figures do not appear in the published Silmarillion. The family tree as presented follows Tolkien's late note The Shibboleth of Fëanor.

¶ In the published Silmarillion, Orodreth is Finarfin's second son (and still Finduilas' father), and Gil-galad is Fingon's son.

== Analysis ==
The Tolkien scholar Megan Fontenot, on Tor.com, writes that mental images of Fingolfin are "unforgettable": his ride across Dor-nu-Fauglith to the gates of Morgoth's fortress of Angband, or the image of him "pounding upon the great gates of the dark fortress, blowing great blasts upon a silver horn, demanding that Morgoth show his face and join him in single combat." She notes that Fingolfin's origins are hard to trace through the complex history of Tolkien's legendarium. He is absent from the earliest Fëanor stories in The Book of Lost Tales, and that in Tolkien's many drafts, such as in The Lays of Beleriand, Fingolfin has several different fathers and siblings; further, his name is temporarily assigned to various other characters. Fontenot traces him to a character named Golfin, a prince of the "Gnomes" (Elves) in The Shaping of Middle-earth, created before 1926. Not long afterwards, in The Lay of the Fall of Gondolin and The Lay of the Children of Húrin, he becomes the son of Finwë/Finn and the father of Turgon. It was not until the 1950s, however, that Tolkien finally made Fingolfin the half-brother of Fëanor.

Gregory Hartley, in Christianity & Literature, notes that Fingolfin gleams below Morgoth's shadow "as a star", and avoids Morgoth's strikes "as a lightning shoots from under a dark cloud". Hartley interprets the Christian Tolkien to mean by this an increase in power equivalent to what the New Testament calls being filled with the Holy Spirit. In his view, the imagery and the increase in Fingolfin's strength "suggest that the Secret Fire has taken possession of him; that perhaps he is no longer merely the King of the Noldor but a chosen instrument of the Valar", the gods of Arda.

The Tolkien scholar B. S. W. Barootes writes that in Tolkien's mythology, oaths are "a powerful form of performative language in Middle-earth". He states that they consistently lead to "trouble, pain, and sorrow", giving as prime example the oath of Fëanor, but also mentioning Finrod's oath of service to Barahir's kin, Beren's oath to Thingol, and the broken oath of the Dead of Dunharrow, who are ultimately redeemed when they choose to serve Aragorn as he returns to claim his kingdom. Fingolfin's oath to follow Fëanor back to Middle-earth means his own exile from the blessed realm of Valinor, and his own death.

== Legacy ==
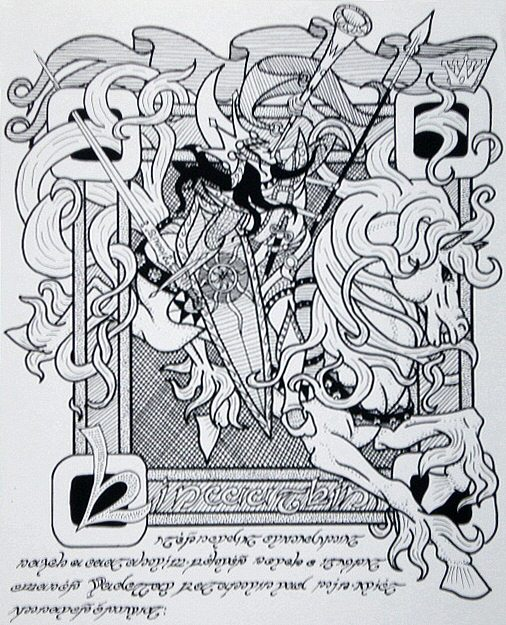
Fingolfin's Ride. Illustration by Tom Loback, 2007

Fingolfin has inspired musicians and artists to create materials about his actions. The song "Time Stands Still (At the Iron Hill)", on the German power-metal band Blind Guardian's 1998 album Nightfall in Middle-Earth, tells the story of the fight between Morgoth and Fingolfin. Austin Gilkeson wrote that "So metal was Fingolfin’s challenge that Morgoth had no choice but to accept." The song (in Russian) "Do Not Ask Me To Praise Him" [Ты славить его меня не проси] by Aire and Saruman [Айрэ и Саруман] on their album "A Elberet[h] Gilt[h]oniel" [А Элберет Гилтониэль] is a lament for Fingolfin by his minstrel some time after that last battle: '... do not ask me to praise him, the day won't be brighter for a candle...'. Fantasy artists have painted illustrations of Fingolfin's actions. Ted Nasmith and Jenny Dolfen have portrayed him leading his people across the ice of the Helcaraxë. Dolfen has illustrated various other scenes from his life, including Fëanor's threatening of Fingolfin, Fingolfin's ride to Angband, and his final fight with Morgoth. Artists including John Howe and Pete Amachree have depicted Fingolfin challenging Morgoth at the gates of Angband.
