= Celebrimbor =

Fictional character in J. R. R. Tolkien's Legendarium

- J. R. R. Tolkien character

In-universe information
- Aliases: 'Hand of Silver', Lord of Eregion
- Race: Elf
- Book(s): The Silmarillion (1977)

Celebrimbor (Sindarin pronunciation: [ˌkɛlɛˈbrimbɔr]) is a fictional character in J. R. R. Tolkien's legendarium. In Tolkien's stories, Celebrimbor was an elven smith who was manipulated into forging the Rings of Power by the Dark Lord Sauron, in fair disguise and named Annatar ("Lord of Gifts"). Sauron then secretly made the One Ring to gain control over all the other Rings and dominate Middle-earth, setting in motion the events of The Lord of the Rings.

Tolkien, as a professional philologist, had been asked to translate an inscription at the late Roman temple of Nodens at Lydney Park in Gloucestershire. The inscription recorded a curse upon a ring; the place was named "Dwarf's Hill"; and he traced Nodens to an Irish hero, Nuada Airgetlám, "Nuada of the Silver-Hand". This combination inspired him to create Celebrimbor (whose name means "Silver-Hand" in Tolkien's invented language of Sindarin), dangerous rings, and dwarves skilled in craftsmanship and friendly to Celebrimbor as elements in his fantasy.

Celebrimbor appears in the 2014 video game Middle-earth: Shadow of Mordor and its 2017 sequel, where he is voiced by Alastair Duncan. In the 2022 television show The Lord of the Rings: The Rings of Power, he is played by Charles Edwards.

== Middle-earth narrative ==
Timeline
Epoch	History of Celebrimbor and the Rings
First Age	Celebrimbor, grandson of Fëanor and son of Curufin, is born (The Silmarillion)
Second Age	Celebrimbor becomes lord of Eregion; Under the instruction of "Annatar" (Sauron), Celebrimbor and the Elves begin crafting Rings of Power; The Elves craft the Three Rings without Sauron's involvement; Sauron makes the One Ring to rule the world; Celebrimbor perceives that Sauron has betrayed the Elves; Sauron destroys Eregion; Celebrimbor dies; Elves and Men make war on Sauron; Sauron is defeated; Isildur cuts the One Ring from Sauron's hand
Third Age	Isildur loses the One Ring, is killed; Bilbo Baggins finds the One Ring; Sauron re-enters Mordor; The One Ring is destroyed at Mount Doom; Sauron is utterly vanquished

Celebrimbor was the son of Curufin, one of the sons of Fëanor and Nerdanel; he was Fëanor's only known grandchild. Fëanor was the most skilful craftsman of the First Age, forging the three Silmarils to capture some of the light of the Two Trees of Valinor. Celebrimbor followed his father and grandfather to Middle-earth, leaving his mother behind in Aman with Finarfin's people. He repudiated his father when Celegorm and Curufin were driven out of Nargothrond. (Note: Tolkien 1996, ch. 4 "Of Dwarves and Men") During the Second Age, Celebrimbor lived in the Elvish realm of Eregion and founded a brotherhood of jewel-smiths. (Note: Tolkien 1954a, book 2, ch. 4 "A Journey in the Dark")

=== Dwarf-friend ===
From the early days of Eregion, Celebrimbor fostered the relationship with Khazad-dûm (Moria), the neighbouring Dwarf-kingdom. He became friends with Narvi, (Note: Tolkien 1980, part 2, ch. 4 "The History of Galadriel and Celeborn") a great Dwarf-craftsman, and together they made the West-gate of Khazad-dûm. Celebrimbor's special contribution was the inscriptions on the gateway.

=== Ring-maker ===
Sauron, in disguise, deceived Celebrimbor and the smiths of Eregion into making Rings of Power, and then secretly made the One Ring to gain control over all the others, and so dominate Middle-earth. (Note: Tolkien 1977, "Of the Rings of Power and the Third Age") Diagram has clickable links.

Later, someone naming himself Annatar arrived in Eregion. He appeared to be an Elf, and claimed he has been sent by the Valar to share his wisdom and skills in ring-craft and jewelry for the benefit of all Middle-earth; but in fact he was the Dark Lord Sauron in disguise. Annatar provided valuable and seemingly benevolent guidance and instruction to Celebrimbor and the smiths of Eregion, and they began making the Rings of Power for the rulers of Middle-earth—seven for the Dwarf-lords and nine for Men. Secretly, without Sauron's knowledge, Celebrimbor also forged three Rings for the Elves, the greatest and fairest of the Rings of Power. The three Rings were thus free of Sauron's corrupting influence.

At the same time, Sauron secretly forged a ring: the One Ring which would enable him to rule Middle-earth. Later Sauron reassumed his role as the Dark Lord and placed the One Ring on his finger, claiming dominion over all the Rings of Power and their bearers. Before this, Celebrimbor had believed Sauron to be what he claimed to be, but realising the truth he and the Elves of Eregion defied Sauron by withholding the other rings from him. He had already sent the three Rings away for safekeeping.

With his scheme exposed to the Elves, Sauron retaliated by attacking Eregion, initiating the War of the Elves and Sauron, and laying waste to the realm. Celebrimbor was captured in the sack of Eregion, and was forced under torture to disclose where the Nine and the Seven were held, but he would not reveal the whereabouts of the three Elvish Rings. Sauron captured the lesser rings and used them as instruments of evil in later years, particularly against Men. Celebrimbor died from his torment; his body, shot with arrows, was then hung upon a pole and used by Sauron's forces like a banner on the battlefield.

=== Alternative backgrounds ===
Like Galadriel and Gil-galad, Celebrimbor first appeared as a character in The Lord of the Rings and then had to be inserted into The Silmarillion, leading to multiple changes to his descent. In a c. 1968 version of the story, included in the essay Eldarin Hands, Fingers and Numerals, Celebrimbor was one of the Teleri of Aman, one of the three companions of Galadriel and Celeborn (here made into a Telerin prince Teleporno or Telporno). Christopher Tolkien noted that his father had mentioned Celebrimbor's descent from Fëanor in the appendices to The Lord of the Rings, and had underlined it in one of his personal copies, writing in the margin a note stating that Celebrimbor was Curufin's son, and that if he had remembered this he would have felt bound to retain that version. A different version, in the late essay Of Dwarves and Men, has Celebrimbor as one of the Sindar who claimed descent from Daeron, and at one point, Celebrimbor was also one of the Noldor of Gondolin.

== House of Finwë ==
Celebrimbor was of the royal line of Finwë, high king of the Noldor, the elves especially skilled in craftwork who migrated to Valinor and lived in the blessed realm.

Fëanor family tree (Note: The birth order of Fëanor's sons in the family tree is based on The Shibboleth of Fëanor, a late note by Tolkien. In The Silmarillion the birth order is: Maedhros, Maglor, Celegorm, Caranthir, Curufin (father of Celebrimbor), Amrod, and Amras.)

Finwë	Míriel	Mahtan
Fëanor	Nerdanel
Maedhros	Celegorm	Caranthir	Amrod
Maglor	Curufin	Amras
Celebrimbor

== Real-world origins ==
In 1928, a 4th-century pagan cult temple was excavated at Lydney Park, Gloucestershire. Tolkien was asked to investigate a Latin inscription there: "For the god Nodens. Silvianus has lost a ring and has donated one-half [its worth] to Nodens. Among those who are called Senicianus do not allow health until he brings it to the temple of Nodens." An old name for the place was Dwarf's Hill, and in 1932 Tolkien, a professional philologist, traced Nodens to the Irish hero Nuada Airgetlám, "Nuada of the Silver-Hand".

The Tolkien scholar Tom Shippey thought this "a pivotal influence" on Tolkien's Middle-earth, combining as it did a god-hero, a ring, dwarves, and a silver hand. The J. R. R. Tolkien Encyclopedia states that Mathew Lyons noted the "Hobbit-like appearance of [Dwarf's Hill]'s mine-shaft holes", and that Tolkien was, according to the Lydney curator Sylvia Jones, extremely interested in the hill's folklore on his stay there. It adds that Helen Armstrong commented that the place inspired "Celebrimbor and the fallen realms of Moria and Eregion". The scholar of English literature John M. Bowers notes that Celebrimbor is the Sindarin for "Silver Hand", and that "because the place was known locally as Dwarf's Hill and honeycombed with abandoned mines, it naturally suggested itself as background for the Lonely Mountain and the Mines of Moria."

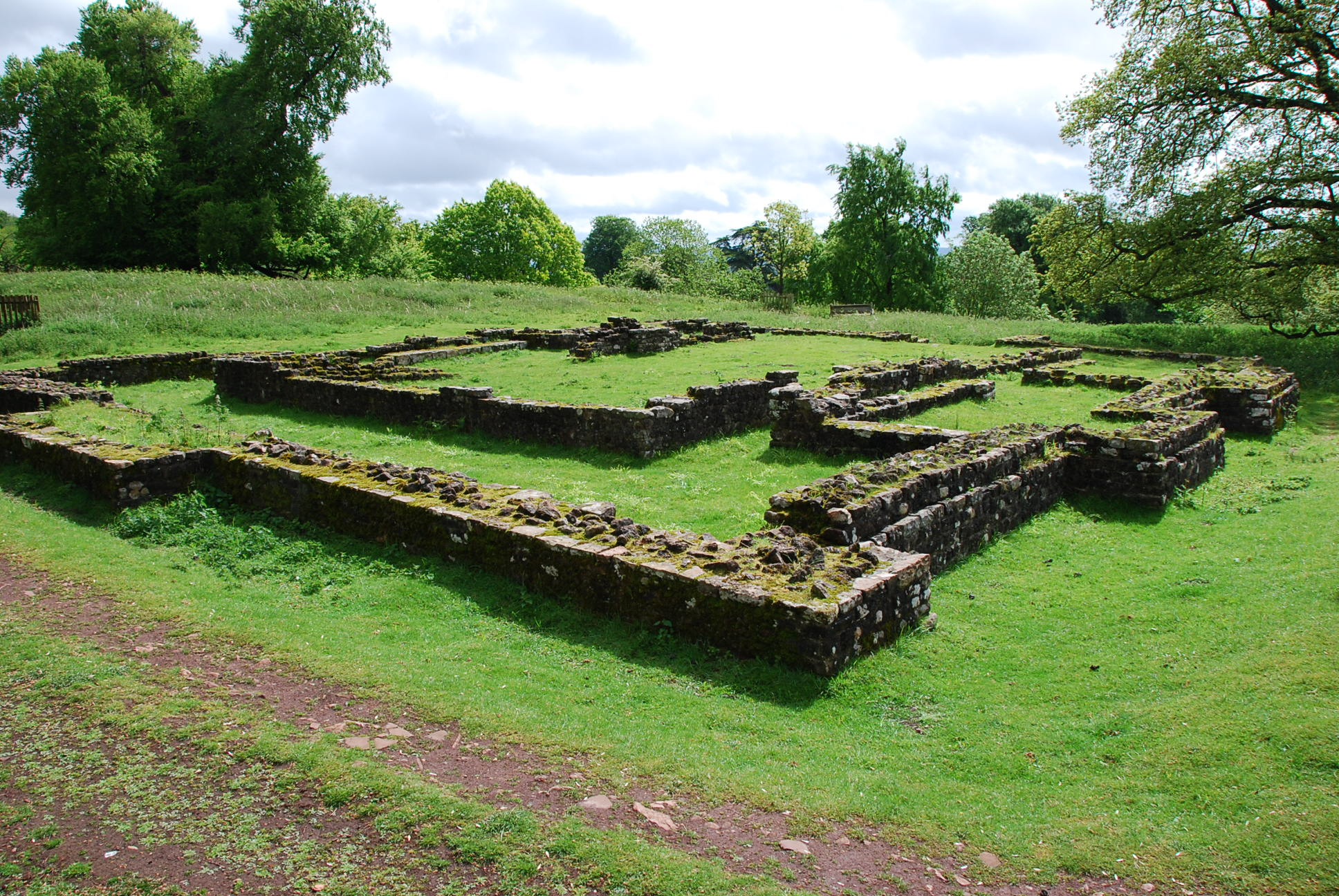
Tolkien visited the temple of Nodens at a place called "Dwarf's Hill" and translated an inscription with a curse upon a ring. It may have inspired his dwarves, Mines of Moria, rings, and Celebrimbor "Silver-Hand".

Imagemap with clickable links. Apparent influence of archaeological and philological work at Nodens' Temple on Tolkien's Middle-earth legendarium

== Adaptations ==
=== Video games ===
Celebrimbor reappears in the video game Middle-earth: Shadow of Mordor and its sequel as a wraith who gives superhuman powers to the non-canonical ranger Talion when the two of them combine, as shown in the half-Man, half-wraith illustration.

Celebrimbor appears in the 2014 video game Middle-earth: Shadow of Mordor where he is voiced by Alastair Duncan. In order not simply to copy Peter Jackson's films, the game's makers Monolith Productions decided to combine a minor but significant Middle-earth character from The Silmarillion, Celebrimbor, with an original character of their own invention, Talion. The game takes place sometime between the action of The Hobbit and The Lord of the Rings at which time Celebrimbor survives as an amnesiac wraith. After being bonded with Talion (a ranger of Gondor) the two become an immortal fighting team unable to leave Mordor. Over the game, Celebrimbor lends his abilities as a wraith to Talion, and the two recover Celebrimbor's lost memories of Sauron and the forging of the Rings of Power: Sauron comes to Celebrimbor to give him a powerful hammer to forge the rings. Then Celebrimbor is betrayed by Sauron, forced to inscribe the incantation in the One Ring, and tortured and beaten to death by Sauron after an attempted coup. After the defeat of Sauron's captains, Celebrimbor describes defeating Sauron himself as futile and wishes to depart for Valinor, but is convinced to stay by Talion; he then mentions his desire to forge a new Ring of Power immune to Sauron's influence. This leads to the events of the 2017 sequel Middle-earth: Shadow of War, which reviewers described as "fun, inventive, exciting—and totally non-canonical". In Shadow of War, Celebrimbor and Talion successfully forge a new Ring of Power that appears to be free of Sauron's influence and is stated to be equal in power to the nine Rings of the Nazgûl without their corrupting influence. They use their new Ring to take the fight to Sauron with an army of Uruks, with Talion noticing Celebrimbor becoming more aggressive and worn out. Eventually revealed to fully intend to overthrow Sauron rather than destroy him, Celebrimbor ends his bond with Talion and possesses Eltariel (an Elven assassin who is a major character in the game) to use her to defeat Sauron. Talion survives by becoming a Nazgûl, and Celebrimbor is defeated when forced out of Eltariel and is quickly absorbed by Sauron trapping both of them in the form of a large flaming eye on top of Barad-dûr. Celebrimbor remains trapped as part of the Dark Lord until the One Ring is destroyed, freeing the spirit as Sauron dies.

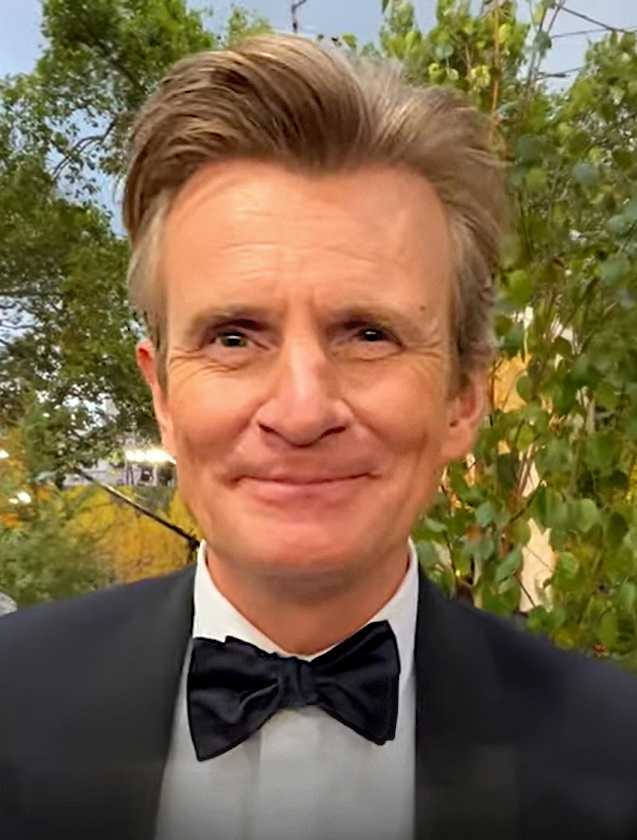
Charles Edwards played Celebrimbor in The Rings of Power.

=== Other ===
Celebrimbor's Secret is the title of an expansion, part of "The Ring-maker Cycle" series, for The Lord of the Rings: The Card Game, a non-collectible customizable card game produced by Fantasy Flight Games from 2011.

Celebrimbor is played by the English actor Charles Edwards in the television series The Lord of the Rings: The Rings of Power, from 2022.
