= Tuor and Idril =

Characters in Tolkien's Middle-earth legendarium

Tuor
- Tolkien character

In-universe information
- Aliases: Eladar, Ulmondil, 'The Blessed'
- Race: Men
- Book(s): The Silmarillion; Unfinished Tales; The Book of Lost Tales II; The Fall of Gondolin

Idril
- Tolkien character

In-universe information
- Alias: Celebrindal
- Race: Elves
- Book(s): The Silmarillion; Unfinished Tales; The Book of Lost Tales II; The Fall of Gondolin

Tuor Eladar and Idril Celebrindal are fictional characters from J. R. R. Tolkien's Middle-earth legendarium. They are the parents of Eärendil the Mariner and grandparents of Elrond Half-elven: through their progeny, they become the ancestors of the Númenóreans and of the King of the Reunited Kingdom Aragorn Elessar. Both characters play a pivotal role in The Fall of Gondolin, one of Tolkien's earliest stories; it formed the basis for a section in his later work, The Silmarillion, and was expanded as a standalone book in 2018.

Tuor and Idril's marriage was one of only three between Men and High Elves in Tolkien's writings. Scholars have compared Tuor to Odysseus in Greek mythology, and to Aeneas in Roman mythology, while Idril's story has been likened to those of Cassandra and of Helen of Troy.

== Fictional history ==
Tuor Eladar, also known as Ulmondil ("The Blessed of Ulmo"), is the central character of The Fall of Gondolin. He is a great hero of the Third House of Men in the First Age of Middle-earth, the only son of Huor and Rían and the cousin of the ill-fated Túrin Turambar. Huor is killed covering the retreat of Turgon, King of Gondolin, in the Battle of Tears Unnumbered, the Nírnaeth Arnoediad. Rían, having received no news of her husband, becomes distraught and wanders into the wild. She is taken care of by the local Grey-elves, and before the end of the year she bears a son and calls him Tuor. But she delivers him to the care of the Elves and departs, dying upon the lonely green grave-mound, the Hill of the Slain, at the site of the Battle of Tears Unnumbered. (Note: Tolkien 1977, Ch. 23, "Of Tuor and the Fall of Gondolin")

Tuor is fostered by the Elves in the caves of Androth in the Mountains of Mithrim, in the Hithlum region of Beleriand, living a hard and wary life. When Tuor is sixteen, their leader Annael decides to leave, but during the march his people are scattered. Tuor is captured by the Easterlings, Men who had been sent there by the Dark Lord Morgoth and who had cruelly oppressed the few people left there. After three years of thraldom under Lorgan the Easterling, Tuor escapes and returns to the caves.

For four years he lives as an outlaw, seeing no way of escape from the region of Dor-lómin, which is bordered by mountains. He kills many of the Easterlings that he comes upon during his journeys, and his name is feared. Meanwhile, the godlike Vala Ulmo, Lord of Waters, hears of Tuor's plight and chooses Tuor to bear a message of warning to Turgon, Lord of the Hidden City of Gondolin. By Ulmo's power a spring near Tuor's cave overflows, and following the stream Tuor crosses Dor-lómin to the mountains of Ered Lómin. Under the guidance of two Elves sent there by Ulmo, Gelmir and Arminas, he passes through the ancient Gate of the Noldor into the land of Nevrast, becoming the first Man to reach the shore of the Great Sea, Belegaer. From there he is led by seven swans, arriving at last at Turgon's old dwellings at Vinyamar.

Tuor finds arms and armour in the ruins of Vinyamar, and meets Ulmo himself on the seashore. Ulmo appoints Tuor to be his messenger, and tells him to seek King Turgon in Gondolin. He gives Tuor the Elf Voronwë as his guide. Voronwë leads Tuor along the southern slopes of Ered Wethrin, and they catch a brief glimpse of Tuor's cousin Túrin near the Pools of Ivrin, the only time the paths of the two ever cross. Journeying through the harsh winter, they reach the hidden city of Gondolin. Tuor tells Turgon of Ulmo's warning that Morgoth now knows of Gondolin's existence, and is about to destroy it, but Turgon refuses to abandon the city.

Tuor remains in the city and falls in love with Turgon's only child, Idril Celebrindal, whose mother Elenwë died crossing the northern ice during the Elves' return from Valinor. In contrast to the first union of Elves and Men, that between Lúthien and Beren, Tuor and Idril are allowed to marry without difficulty. Their wedding is celebrated with great mirth and joy, as King Turgon had grown fond of Tuor. He makes Tuor the leader of the House of the Swan Wing, one of the twelve houses of Gondolin. Turgon also remembers the last words of Huor, which prophesied that a "star" would arise out of his and Turgon's lineage which would redeem the Children of Ilúvatar (Elves and Men) from Morgoth. However, the marriage angers Turgon's influential nephew Maeglin, who had desired Idril for himself. Maeglin defies Turgon's order to stay within the mountains, and is captured by Orcs during a trip to gather resources. Morgoth promises Maeglin both Gondolin and Idril in return for telling him where the hidden city is. Noticing that Maeglin is behaving suspiciously, Idril decides to construct a secret passage out of Gondolin.

During the ensuing sack of Gondolin, Tuor defends Idril and their only child Eärendil from Orcs and the traitorous Maeglin, who threatens to murder the child by throwing him from the city wall. After killing Maeglin, they lead a remnant of the people of Gondolin to escape through the secret passage. In the mountain heights they meet a Balrog, which Glorfindel, chief of the House of the Golden Flower, fights and defeats. They reach the estuary of the Mouths of Sirion; Tuor and his people live there for a while, also founding a town on the Isle of Balar.

Longing for the Sea, Tuor builds the ship Eärramë ("Sea-wing"). He and Idril sail to the West; the Elves and Men of Beleriand believe that the two of them arrived in Valinor, bypassing the Ban of the Valar that prohibited mortals from entering the Undying Lands, and that Tuor alone of Men is allowed to be treated as an Elf. Eärendil inherits the Elfstone Elessar from Idril; it is a magical green gem which bestows healing powers on those who touch it. The Elfstone is passed down to their descendant Aragorn by the end of the Third Age, as narrated in The Lord of the Rings; when he becomes king, he takes the name Elessar.

Illustrations by Tom Loback, 2007

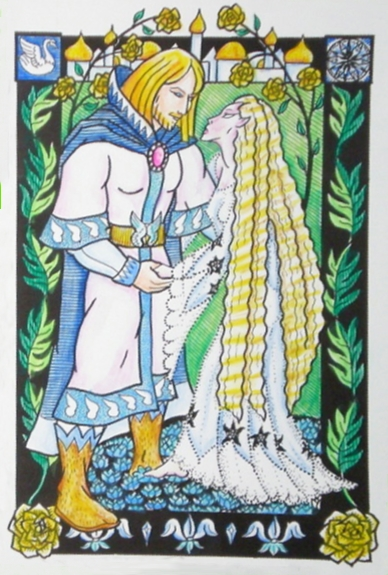
The wedding of Tuor and Idril

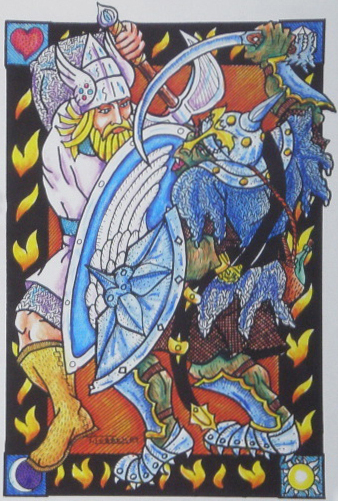
Battle for Gondolin:
Tuor kills the Orc Othrod

=== Family tree ===
Half-elven family tree (Note: Tolkien 1977, "Of the Rings of Power and the Third Age": Family Trees I and II: "The house of Finwë and the Noldorin descent of Elrond and Elros", and "The descendants of Olwë and Elwë") (Note: Tolkien 1955, Appendix A: Annals of the Kings and Rulers, I The Númenórean Kings)

Melian the Maia	Thingol of the Teleri	House of Bëor	House of Haleth	House of Hador	Finwë of the Noldor	Indis of the Vanyar	Olwë of the Teleri
Barahir	Belegund	Hareth	Galdor	Fingolfin	Finarfin	Eärwen
Lúthien	Beren	Rían	Huor	Húrin	Turgon	Elenwë
Dior	Nimloth	Tuor	Idril
Eluréd	Elurín	Elwing	Eärendil	Celeborn	Galadriel
Elros	Elrond	Celebrían
22 Kings of Númenor and Lords of Andúnië
Elendil
Isildur	Anárion
22 Kings of Arnor and Arthedain	27 Kings of Gondor
Arvedui	Fíriel
15 Dúnedain; Chieftains
Aragorn	Arwen	Elladan	Elrohir
Eldarion	daughters

Colour key:
Colour	Description
	Elves
	Men
	Maiar
	Half-elven
	Half-elven who chose the fate of Elves
	Half-elven who chose the fate of mortal Men

== Concept and creation ==
The story of Tuor and Idril is told briefly in the 23rd chapter of The Silmarillion, which recounts the fall of the Noldor city of Gondolin. A very early version, written circa 1916–17, is found in The Book of Lost Tales. (Note: Tolkien 1984b, "The Fall of Gondolin") The start of a more complete and developed narrative, which Tolkien began after finishing The Lord of the Rings in the 1950s, is included in Unfinished Tales. However, the narrative gets no further than Tuor's first sight of Gondolin. (Note: Tolkien 1980, "Of Tuor and his Coming to Gondolin")

In the original Fall of Gondolin story, Tuor is said to have carried an axe named Dramborleg, "Thudder-Sharp", that "smote both a heavy dint as of a club and cleft as a sword". Later writings state that the Axe of Tuor is preserved in Númenor as an heirloom of the Kings. (Note: Tolkien 1980, "A Description of Númenor", note 2)

== Analysis ==
=== Tuor ===
Scholars have stated that Tuor demonstrated wisdom by listening to his wife, whose wise counsel is her defining trait, whereas a leader of greater stature like Thingol, the Elvenking of Doriath, was brought low by his recklessness and pride. Jennifer Rogers writes in Tolkien Studies that Christopher Tolkien seamlessly introduces the story in his book The Fall of Gondolin by providing short extracts of his father's 1926 "Sketch of the Mythology" and "The Flight of the Noldoli from Valinor", thus setting "Tuor's story in the context of the Doom of Mandos and the Oath of Fëanor", in other words within the legendarium. The Tolkien scholar Linda Greenwood notes that Tuor is the only mortal Man in the legendarium permitted to live as an immortal. Tolkien suggests an explanation in a letter, namely that Eru Ilúvatar, the One God, directly intervenes as a unique exception, just as in Lúthien's assumption of a mortal fate. (Note: Carpenter 2023, #153 to Peter Hastings, September 1954)

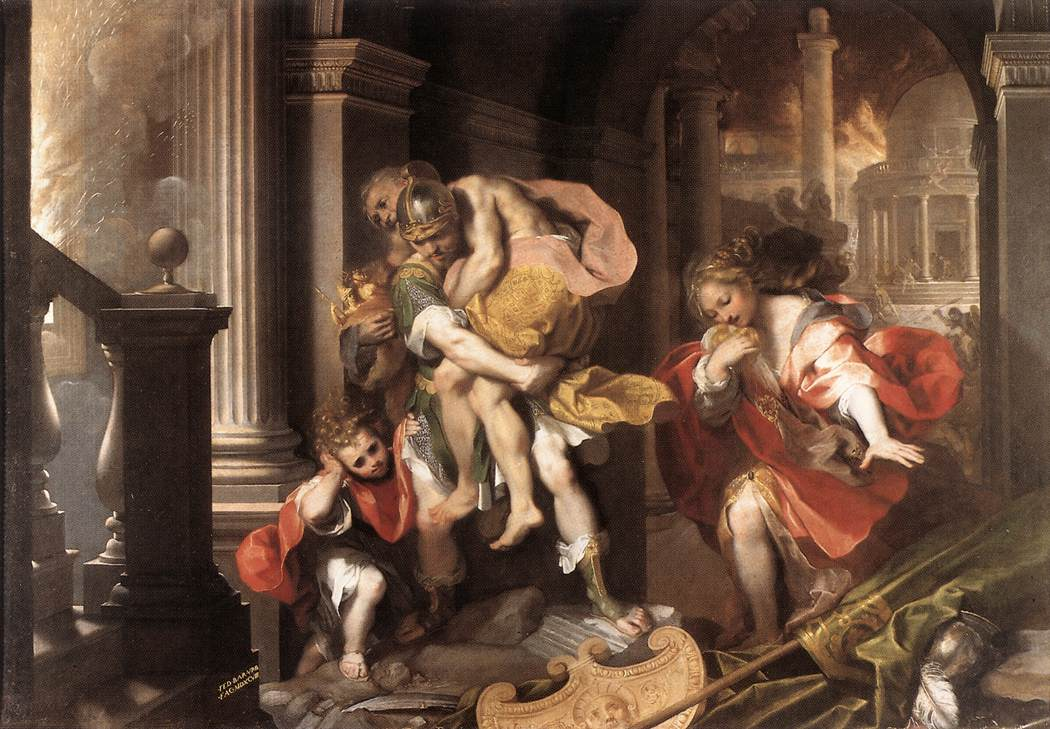
Tuor has to flee the wreck of a kingdom, just as Aeneas had to escape the wreck of Troy, as depicted in this painting by Federico Barocci, 1598

David Greenman, in Mythlore, compares Tuor both with the Hobbit heroes of The Lord of the Rings, and with classical heroes:

David Greenman's comparison of Tuor with other heroes
Era	Tolkien's "quest-heroes"	Action	Classical analogues
Early	Tuor of Gondolin	Escapes wreck of city, creates anew elsewhere	Aeneas escapes the fall of Troy, founds Rome
Late	Hobbits of the Shire	Return to despoiled home, scour it clean	Odysseus scours Ithaca of Penelope's suitors

Tolkien's biographer John Garth writes in his book Tolkien's Worlds that the windswept treeless hills of Nevrast, where Tuor reaches the cliffs and becomes the first Man to see the sea in the legendarium, are "perfectly Cornish". Garth notes that Tuor stands there at sunset with his arms outspread until the sea-Vala Ulmo appears from the water to prophesy the birth of Tuor's son Eärendil, who ends up with a Silmaril in the sky as the Evening Star. The German artist Jenny Dolfen has painted the scene in her 2019 "And His Heart Was Filled With Longing" as a Cornish landscape, with Tuor surrounded by seagulls. Garth states that this means that the Evening Star was not in the western sky that Tuor saw, whereas when Tolkien visited the Lizard peninsula in Cornwall in 1914, the planet had risen and set "due west", an uncommon sight. A few weeks later, Tolkien wrote the first poem of his legendarium, "The Voyage of Earendel the Evening Star".

=== Idril ===
The Tolkien scholar Melanie Rawls identifies Idril as a female character with agency in Tolkien's works: she is shown to be capable of taking action once she has achieved understanding. Idril counsels her father, Turgon, who "is very masculine and in need of a feminine counterpart", in his rule of Gondolin. Rawls states, too, that Idril is a "well-balanced personality", and that Tuor, who combines masculine (warrior) and feminine (counsellor) qualities, "matches her well". In Tor.com's series on the people of Middle-earth, Megan N. Fontenot praises the characterisation of Idril's wisdom and forbearance as told in the story of the Fall of Gondolin. In Fontenot's view, Idril's story represents "a significant milestone in Tolkien's storytelling career", as she saw in it many echoes of several other female characters of Middle-earth.

Greenman compares and contrasts Idril's part in the story to Cassandra and Helen of Troy, two prominent female figures in accounts of the Trojan War: like the prophetess, Idril had a premonition of impending danger and like Helen, her beauty played a major role in instigating Maeglin's betrayal of Gondolin, which ultimately led to its downfall and ruin. Conversely, Greenman notes that Idril's advice to enact a contingency plan for a secret escape route out of Gondolin was heeded by her people, and that she had always rejected Maeglin's advances and remained faithful to Tuor.

In Tolkien's fictional language of Sindarin, the name Idril is a form of the Quenya name Itarillë, Itarildë, or Itaril, meaning "sparkling brilliance". (Note: Tolkien 1996, "The Shibboleth of Fëanor") The epithet Celebrindal means "Silverfoot": according to the early Sketch of the Mythology (the first version of the Silmarillion from 1926), she was so named "for the whiteness of her foot; and she walked and danced ever unshod in the white ways and green lawns of Gondolin." Tolkien describes her thus in this text: "Very fair and tall was she, well nigh of warrior's stature, and her hair was a fountain of gold." Christopher Tolkien comments that this description may be the prototype of that of Galadriel. (Note: Tolkien 1986, The Earliest 'Silmarillion') The account is present in the earliest form of the story The Fall of Gondolin, in which "the people called her Idril of the Silver Feet in that she went ever barefoot and bareheaded, king's daughter as she was, save only at pomps of the Ainur"; then she is called Talceleb or Taltelepta.

== Adaptations ==
Tolkien suspected that his fellow writer and friend C.S. Lewis had borrowed his ideas; he felt that the characters of Tor and Tinidril in Lewis' Perelandra or Voyage to Venus, published by The Bodley Head in 1943, had a "certain echo of Tuor and Idril", and that Tinidril in particular was a pastiche of both Idril and Tinúviel, an earlier version of his Lúthien character.

In Peter Jackson's film adaptations of Tolkien's Middle-earth, Idril was supposed to be the original owner of the sword Hadhafang, an original invention by the affiliated production company Weta Workshop. It is wielded by Idril's descendants Elrond and Arwen in certain scenes of both The Lord of the Rings and The Hobbit film series.
