= Gondolin =

Secret city in Tolkien's legendarium

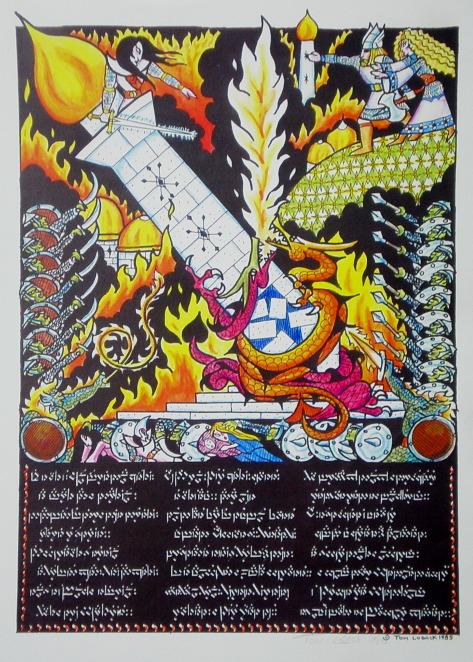
The fall of Turgon's Tower. Illustration by Tom Loback, 2007

In J.R.R. Tolkien's legendarium, Gondolin is a secret city of Elves in the First Age of Middle-earth, and the greatest of their cities in Beleriand. The story of the Fall of Gondolin tells of the arrival there of Tuor, a prince of Men; of the betrayal of the city to the Dark Lord Morgoth by the king's nephew, Maeglin; and of its subsequent siege and catastrophic destruction by Morgoth's armies. It also relates the flight of the fugitives to the Havens of Sirion, the wedding of Tuor and the Elf Idril, and the childhood of their son Eärendil.

Scholars have noted the presence of tank-like iron fighting machines in Morgoth's army in early versions of the story, written soon after Tolkien returned from the Battle of the Somme. They have likened the story of the Fall of Gondolin to the sack of Troy in ancient Greek literature, or to Virgil's Aeneid; the role of Tuor's wife Idril has similarly been compared to that of Cassandra or Helen of Troy in accounts of the Trojan War.

== City ==
=== Founding ===
The city of Gondolin (Note: Tolkien explained its origin in his "Name-list to "The Fall of Gondolin" thus: "Gondolin meaneth in Gnomish 'stone of song' (whereby figuratively the Gnomes meant stone that was carven and wrought to great beauty)". (Note: Tolkien 1984b p. 216.)) in Beleriand, in the extreme northwest of Middle-earth, is founded with divine inspiration. The mightiest of the Elvish cities, it is hidden by mountains and endures for centuries before being betrayed and destroyed. (Note: Tolkien 1977, Ch. 23, "Of Tuor and the Fall of Gondolin")

Gondolin is founded by King Turgon in the First Age. According to The Silmarillion, the Vala Ulmo, the Lord of Waters, shows Turgon the Vale of Tumladen in a dream. Thus guided, Turgon travels from his kingdom in Nevrast and finds it. Within the Encircling Mountains is a round level plain surrounded by sheer walls; a ravine and tunnel, the Hidden Way, lead out to the southwest. In the middle of the vale is the steep Amon Gwareth, the "Hill of Watch". There Turgon decides to found a city, designed like the Noldor Elves' former city of Tirion in Valinor. Gondolin is built in secret. The Hidden Way is protected by seven gates, all constantly guarded; the first of wood, then stone, bronze, iron, silver, gold, and steel. After it is completed, he brings all his people from Nevrast to dwell in the hidden city—almost a third of the Noldor of Fingolfin's House—and nearly three quarters of the northern Sindar.

=== Customs ===
[Elrond:] They are old swords, very old swords of the High Elves of the West, my kin. They were made in Gondolin for the Goblin-wars. They must have come from a dragon's hoard or goblin plunder, for dragons and goblins destroyed that city many ages ago. This, Thorin, the runes name Orcrist, the Goblin-cleaver in the ancient tongue of Gondolin; it was a famous blade. This, Gandalf, was Glamdring, Foe-hammer that the king of Gondolin once wore. Keep them well!" (Note: Tolkien 1937, The Hobbit, ch. 3 "A Short Rest")

— J.R.R. Tolkien, The Hobbit

Gondolin develops its own Sindarin dialect, containing regional elements and words adapted from another Elvish language, Quenya. (Note: Tolkien stated that "This differed from the standard [Sindarin] (of Doriath) (a) in having Western and some Northern elements, and (b) in incorporating a good many Noldorin-Quenya words in more or less Sindarized forms. Thus the city was usually called Gondolin (from Q. Ondolin(dë)) with simple replacement of g-, not Goenlin or Goenglin [as it would have been in standard Sindarin]". (Note: Parma Eldalamberon 17, "Words, Phrases and Passages", p. 29))

The Elven smiths of Gondolin make powerful weapons. In The Hobbit, the Gondolin-made swords Orcrist, Glamdring and the dagger later named Sting are found in a Troll-hoard. (Note: Tolkien 1937 ch. 3 "A Short Rest") Each of these weapons has the ability to reveal nearby Orcs by glowing; they terrify Orcs in battle.

According to The Book of Lost Tales, the city has seven names: "’Tis said and ’tis sung: Gondobar am I called and Gondothlimbar, City of Stone and City of the Dwellers in Stone; Gondolin the Stone of Song and Gwarestrin am I named, the Tower of the Guard, Gar Thurion or the Secret Place, for I am hidden from the eyes of Melko; but they who love me most greatly call me Loth, for like a flower am I, even Lothengriol the flower that blooms on the plain." (Note: Tolkien 1984b p. 158)

=== Houses and heraldry ===
Each House of Gondolin had its own emblem; in the House of the Harp, "a harp of silver shone in their blazonry upon a field of black." (Note: Tolkien 1984b, "The Fall of Gondolin" pp. 172–174)

Tuor's bodyguard "wore wings as it were of swans or gulls upon their helms, and the emblem of the White Wing was upon their shields."

Maeglin's House of Moles wore plain black: "Sable was their harness, and they bore no sign or emblem, but their round caps of steel were covered with moleskin."

The Book of Lost Tales states that the active male Elves of Gondolin belong to one of the 11 "Houses" or Thlim, plus the bodyguard of Tuor, accounted as the twelfth. Each house has a distinct symbol: a mole, a swallow, the heavens, a pillar, a tower of snow, a tree, a golden flower, a fountain, a harp, a hammer and anvil, and finally the triple symbol of the King, namely the moon, sun, and scarlet heart worn by the Royal Guard.

=== Fall ===
The city stands for nearly 400 years until Maeglin, Turgon's nephew, betrays it to Morgoth. Maeglin is captured while mining outside the Encircling Mountains, against Turgon's orders. Maeglin is promised Lordship as well as Turgon's daughter Idril, whom he had long coveted. The Dark Lord Morgoth sends an army over the Encircling Mountains during Gondolin's festival of The Gates of Summer, and sacks the city with relative ease. Morgoth's army consists of orcs, Balrogs, dragons and in early versions of the story iron machines powered by "internal fires". These are used to carry soldiers, to surmount difficult obstacles, and to defeat fortifications. Idril, noted for her intuition, had prepared a secret route out of Gondolin prior to the siege. While her father Turgon perishes as his tower is destroyed, Idril flees the city, defended by her husband Tuor, a prince of Men.

== Analysis ==
=== Classical ===
Tolkien scholars have compared the fall of Gondolin to the sack of Troy, noting that both cities were famed for their walls, and likening Tolkien's tale to Virgil's Aeneid. Both have frame stories, situated long after the events they narrate; both have "gods" (Tolkien's Valar) in the action; and both involve an escape. David Greenman compares the actions of Tolkien's quest-heroes to those of Aeneas and Odysseus.

David Greenman's analysis of classical "quest-hero" themes
Event	Classical quest-hero	The Lord of the Rings protagonists
Escape from wreck of a kingdom, creation of a new one	Aeneas, escaping the ruin of Troy	Tuor in the fall of Gondolin
Return to ravaged home, scour it clean	Odysseus on his long-delayed return to Ithaca	The four Hobbits in "The Scouring of the Shire"

Greenman compares and contrasts Idril's part in the story to Cassandra and Helen of Troy, two prominent female figures in accounts of the Trojan War: like the prophetess, Idril had a premonition of impending danger and like Helen, her beauty played a major role in instigating Maeglin's betrayal of Gondolin, which ultimately led to its downfall and ruin. Conversely, Greenman notes that Idril's advice to enact a contingency plan for a secret escape route out of Gondolin was heeded by her people, unlike the warning of Cassandra; and that Idril had always rejected Maeglin's advances and remained faithful to Tuor, unlike Helen who left her husband King Menelaus of Sparta for Prince Paris of Troy.

Alexander Bruce writes that Tolkien's tale parallels Virgil's account, but varies the story. Thus, Morgoth attacks while Gondolin's guard is lowered during a great feast, whereas the Trojans were celebrating the Greeks' apparent retreat, with the additional note of treachery. The Trojan Horse carried the Greeks into Troy, where they set fire to it, paralleled by the fire-serpents which carried "Balrogs in hundreds" into Gondolin. Tolkien's serpents are matched by the great serpents with "burning eyes, fiery and suffused with blood, their tongues a-flicker out of hissing maws" which kill the high priest Laocoön and his sons. Aeneas and his wife Creusa become separated during their escape; her ghost pleads with him to leave when he searches for her, and he travels to Italy; in contrast, Tuor and Idril escape to Sirion together, eventually sailing from there to Valinor. Marco Cristini adds that both cities are fatally attacked during a feast; their heroes both leave their wives to fight, and both see their kings die. Cristini comments further that "The most evident analogy is perhaps the behaviour of Creusa and Idril, who clasp the knees of their husbands to prevent them from joining again the battle when all hope is lost." Scholars have noted that Tolkien himself drew classical parallels for the assault, writing that "Nor Bablon, nor Ninwi, nor the towers of Trui, nor all the many takings of Rûm that is greatest among Men, saw such terror as fell that day upon Amon Gwareth".

Tolkien appears to have based one scene on another classical source, Euripides' play The Trojan Women. Maeglin tries to throw Idril's son Eärendil from the city wall, just as Hector's son Astyanax is thrown down from Troy's walls. Tolkien changes the outcome: Eärendil resists, and Tuor appears just in time to rescue him by throwing Maeglin from the walls instead.

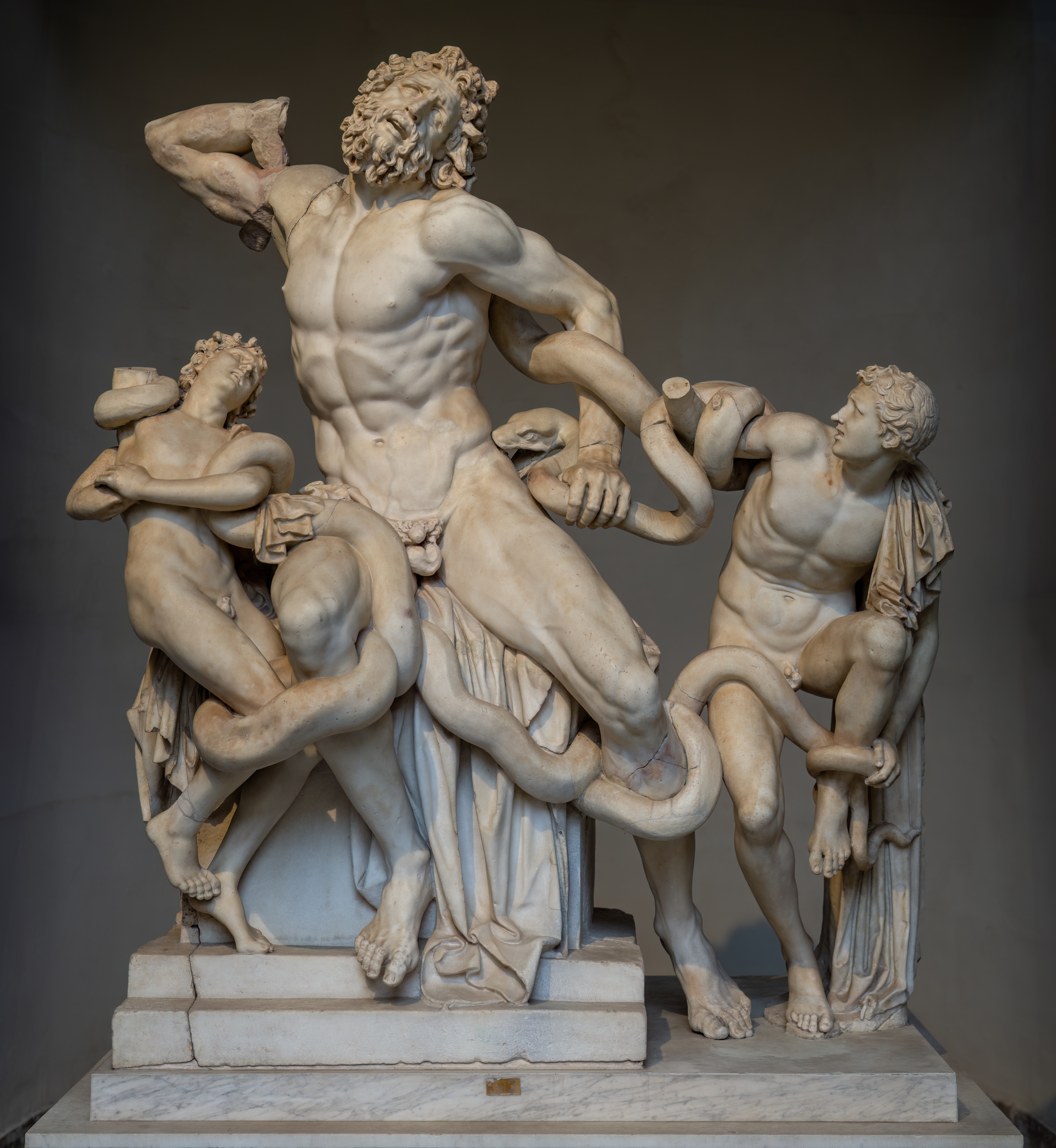
Tolkien's fire-serpents are paralleled by Virgil's great serpents that kill the Trojan priest Laocoön and His Sons
in the fall of Troy.

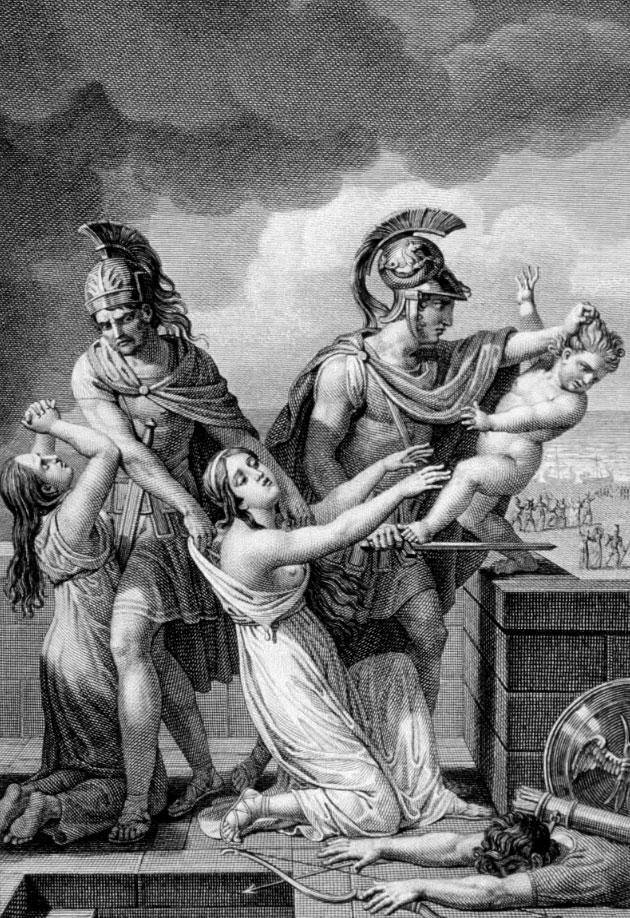
Maeglin's failed attempt to throw Eärendil from the city walls contrasts with Euripides' account of the throwing of the young Astyanax from the walls of Troy.

=== British heraldry ===
The scholar of heraldry Cătălin Hriban writes that the emblems of the houses of Gondolin are simple and figurative, depicting familiar real-world objects. He notes that standard British texts on heraldry describe similar devices. He comments that Maeglin the traitor, of the House of Moles, fittingly has the colour black; like the animal, his people are miners, used to living underground in the dark.

=== Tolkien's wartime experience ===
In his book Tolkien and the Great War, John Garth states that Tolkien wrote his 1917 story "The Fall of Gondolin" in hospital after returning to England from the Battle of the Somme. In his view, the tale's first half seems to reflect Tolkien's "slow acceptance of duty" at the start of the war, while the second half "surely reverberates to his collision with war itself."

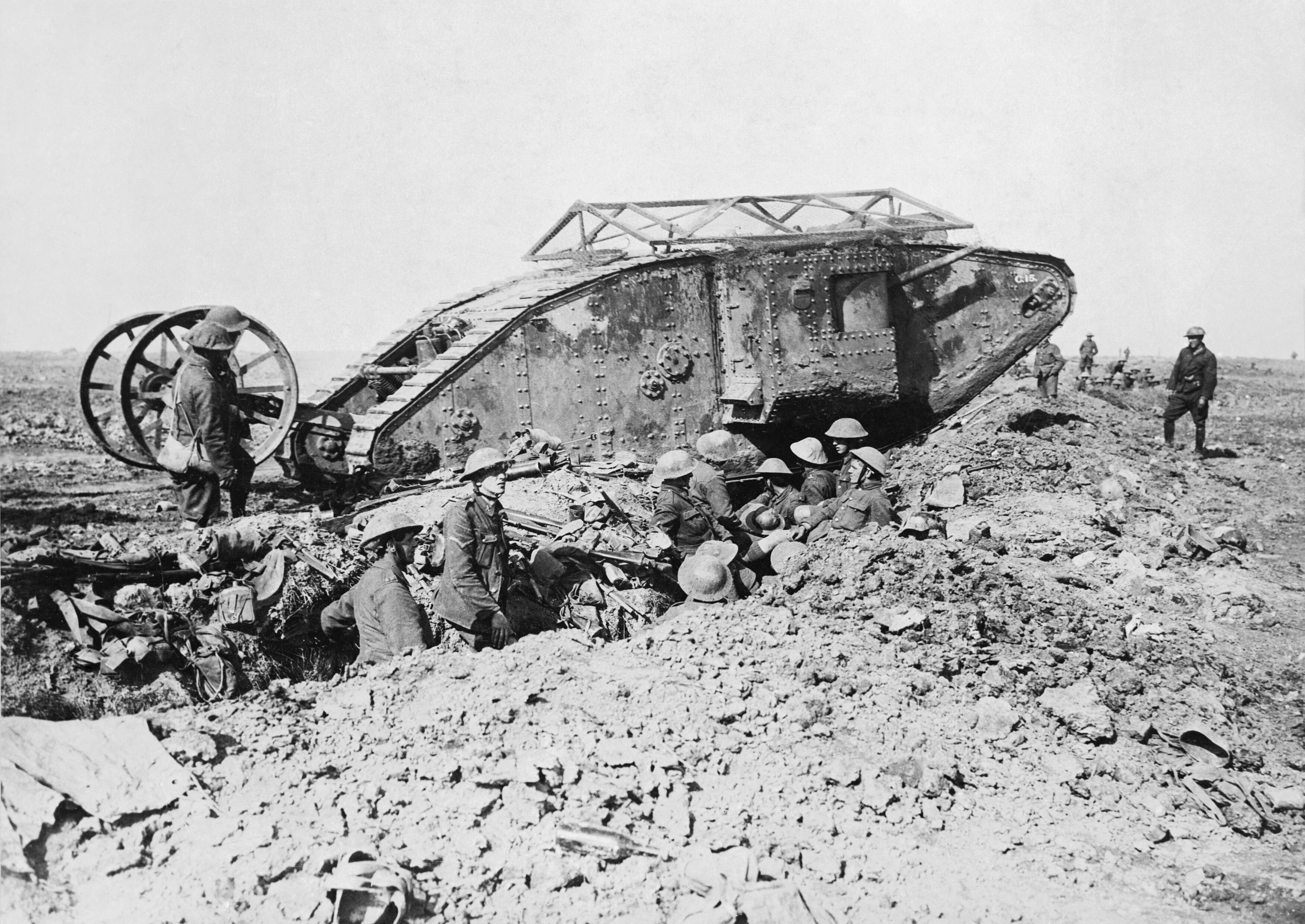
"Beasts like snakes and dragons of irresistible might": a British Mark I tank near Thiepval where Tolkien fought on the Somme in September 1916

To defeat Gondolin, Melkor (at first called Melko) uses monsters, Orcs and Balrogs, supported by "beasts like snakes and dragons of irresistible might that should overcreep the Encircling Hills and lap that plain and its fair city in flame and death". The monstrous beasts are not of flesh and blood, but are made by "smiths and sorcerers". There are three kinds, Garth explains: heavy, slow, bronze dragons that can break gaps in Gondolin's walls; fiery monsters, unable to climb the steep smooth hill on which the city sits; and iron dragons in which Orc-soldiers can ride, and which travel on "iron so cunningly linked that they might flow ... around and above all obstacles", and are armoured so that they clang hollowly when bombarded or attacked with fire. Garth comments that these are not so much like mythical dragons as "the tanks of the Somme", and that to the story's Elf-narrator, a combustion engine would look like "a metal heart filled with flame". Anthony Appleyard similarly likens the mechanical dragons to vehicles driven by internal combustion engines.
