= Hell and Middle-earth =

Theme in Tolkien's writings

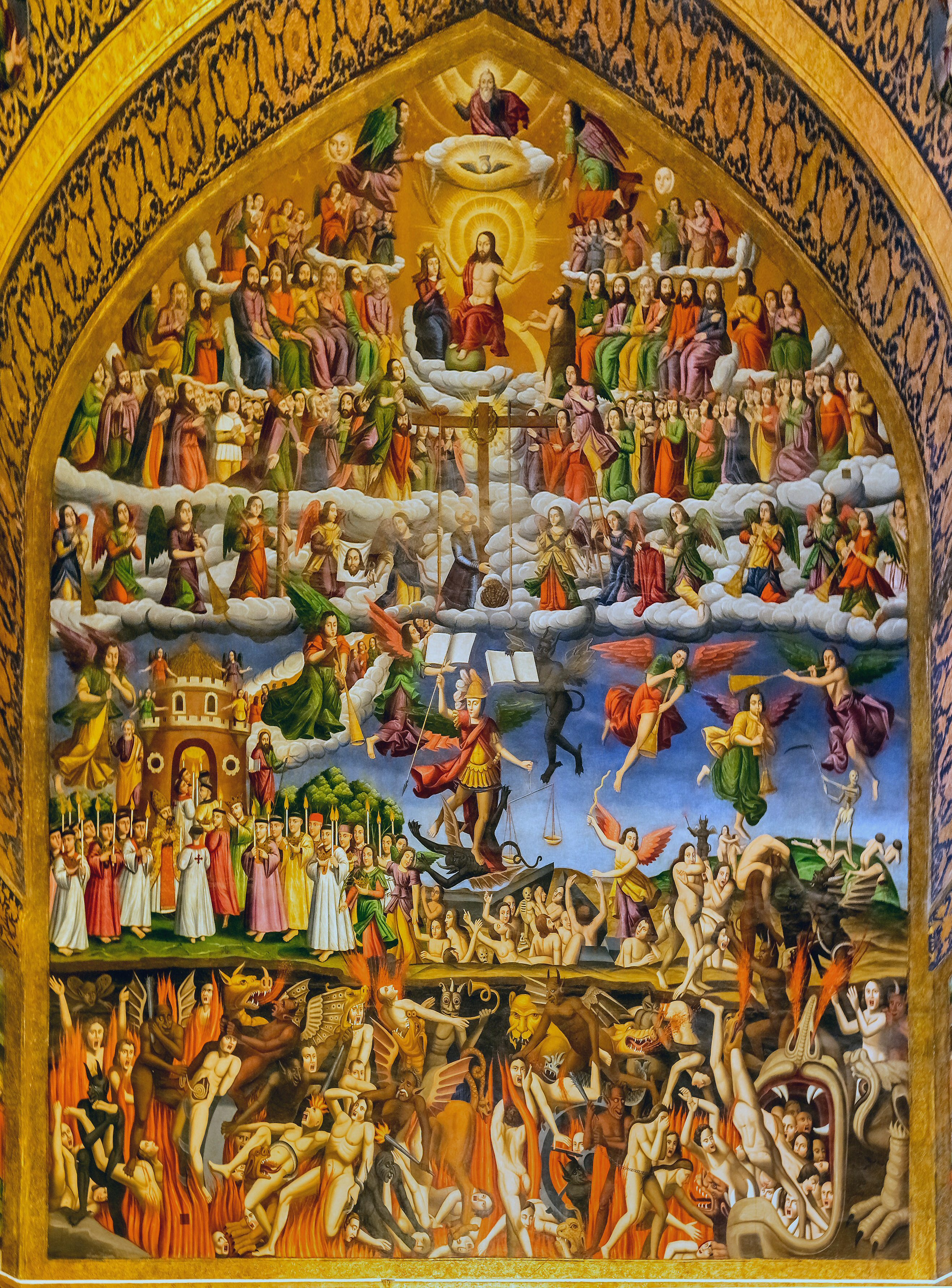
Medieval Christian cosmology: heaven above, earth in the middle, hell below. Vank Cathedral, Isfahan

Scholars have seen multiple resemblances between the medieval Christian conception of hell and evil places in J. R. R. Tolkien's fictional world of Middle-earth. These include the industrial hells of Saruman's Isengard with its underground furnaces and labouring Orcs; the dark tunnels of Moria; Sauron's evil land of Mordor; and Morgoth's subterranean fortress of Angband. The gates to some of these realms, like the guarded West Door of Moria, and the Black Gate to Mordor, too, carry echoes of the gates of hell.

Some of the journeys down into the dark places of Middle-earth, too, have been likened to the katabasis of Ancient Greece, a descent into the underworld, as when Lúthien and Beren descend into Angband, or when Lúthien goes to the Halls of Mandos to plead with him to allow Beren to return to life, paralleling the classical Greek legend of Orpheus and Eurydice. These journeys into hellish places may also recall the medieval theme of the Harrowing of Hell, a story in which Christ descends into hell after his crucifixion, and sets the Devil's captives free with the power of his divine light. The Devil is paralleled by both of Middle-earth's dark lords, Morgoth and Sauron; Sauron is in turn supported by a range of demonic figures, including the Nazgûl who appear like the Devil as black riders on black horses, the fiery-eyed Balrogs, and the Orcs with their devilish habits and appearance.

== Context ==
In medieval Christian cosmology, middle-earth was the realm of men. It was at the centre of three worlds, with heaven above, hell below. J. R. R. Tolkien was a devout Roman Catholic. He described The Lord of the Rings as rich in Christian symbolism. (Note: Carpenter 2023, Letters #142 to Robert Murray, S.J., 2 December 1953) Many theological themes underlie the narrative, including the battle of good versus evil, the triumph of humility over pride, and the activity of grace. (Note: Carpenter 2023, Letters #181 to Michael Straight, drafts, early 1956) The Bible and traditional Christian narrative also influenced The Silmarillion; in particular, the fall of man influenced the Ainulindalë, the fighting amongst the Elves, and the fall of Númenor. (Note: Carpenter 2023, Letters #131 to Milton Waldman, late 1951)

== Hellish places ==
Several places in Tolkien's Middle-earth have been described as being or resembling various kinds of hell. In The Silmarillion, the dark lord Morgoth's underground fastness of Angband in the First Age is an instance. In The Lord of the Rings, the land of Morgoth's successor Sauron, the realm of Mordor with its volcano, Mount Doom, and Sauron's Dark Tower of Barad-Dûr, is another. The dark and dangerous tunnels of Moria form another, as does the enclosed circle of Isengard, centred on the tower of Orthanc, with its underground fires and furnaces, home to Orcs under the control of the traitorous Wizard Saruman.

=== Industrial hells ===
The scholar of English literature Charles A. Huttar describes Isengard as an "industrial hell". He quotes Tolkien's description of Isengard, supplying his own emphasis on Tolkien's words: "tunneled .. circle .. dark .. deep .. graveyard of unquiet dead .. the ground trembled .. treasuries .. furnaces .. iron wheels .. endlessly .. lit from beneath .. venomous." (Note: Tolkien 1954, book 3, ch. 8 "The Road to Isengard") Huttar comments: "The imagery is familiar, its connotations plain. This is yet another hell [after Moria and Mordor]." All the same, he writes, the tower of Orthanc cannot but be admired, with its "marvellous shape" and wonderful, ancient strength; he supposes that for Tolkien, technology could neither be "wholeheartedly embraced nor utterly rejected".

Shippey, discussing Saruman's character, notes several facts about him: Treebeard's comment that "He has a mind of metal and wheels"; that Isengard means "Irontown" in Old English; that the Ents, tree-giants, are attacked in Isengard with "a kind of napalm [or] perhaps ... [given] Tolkien's own experience, a Flammenwerfer". Shippey concludes that Saruman had been led into "wanton pollution ... by something corrupting in the love of machines", which he connects to "Tolkien's own childhood image of industrial ugliness ... Sarehole Mill, with its literally bone-grinding owner".

David D. Oberhelman, writing in the J.R.R. Tolkien Encyclopedia, states, following Anne C. Petty, that there are multiple "industrial 'hells' in Tolkien's work, such as Saruman's blighted, machine-ridden Isengard". He notes that its prototype was the fallen Vala Morgoth's subterranean fortress, Angband, whose name meant "Iron Prison" or "Hell of Iron".

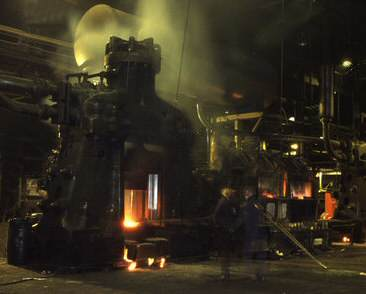
Isengard is an "industrial hell": in Tolkien's words "...hammers thudded. At night plumes of vapour steamed from the vents, lit from beneath with red light".
Steam hammer at work, England

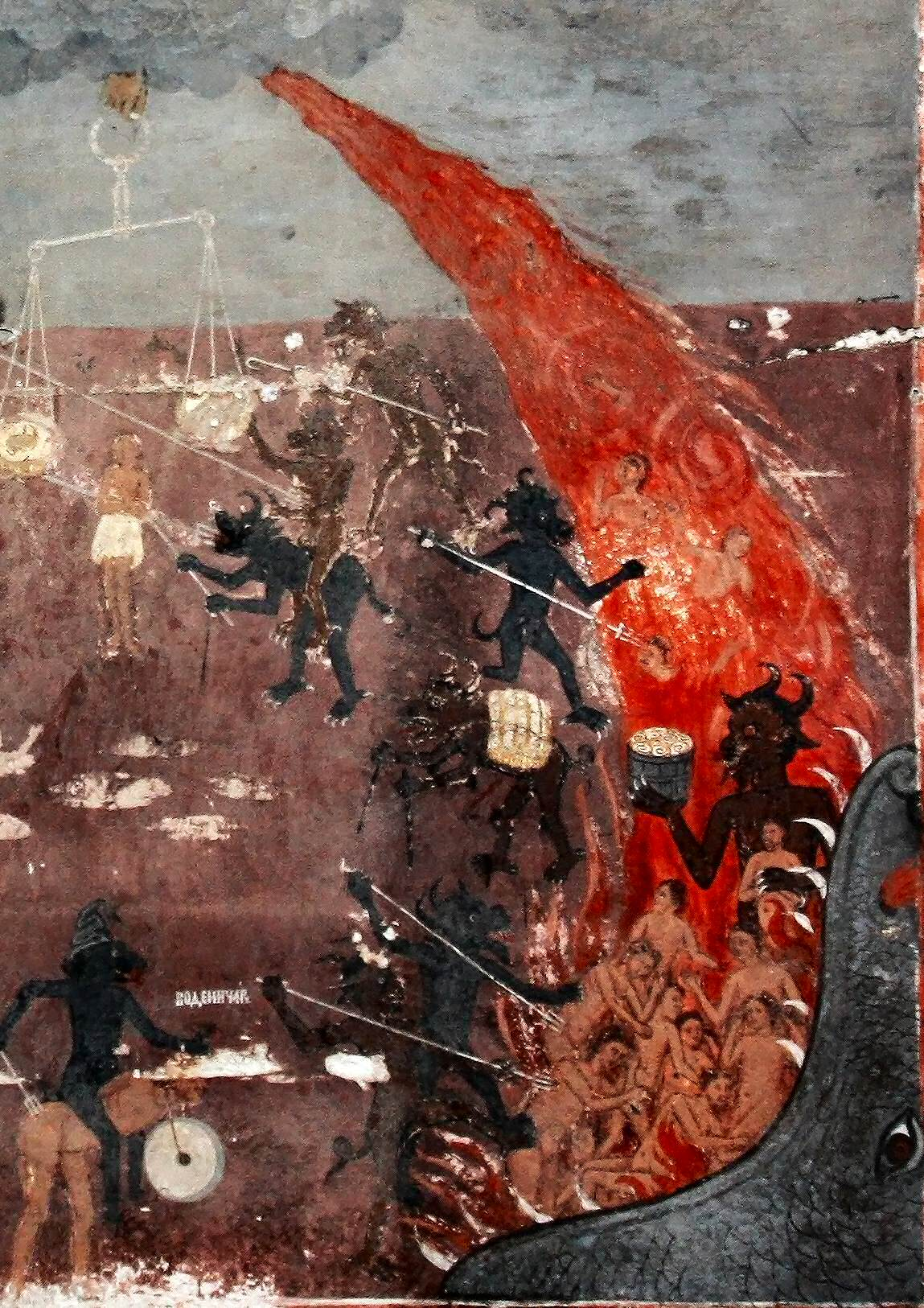
Charles A. Huttar likened Isengard to hell.
Medieval fresco of hell,
St Nicholas in Raduil, Bulgaria

=== Gates of hell ===
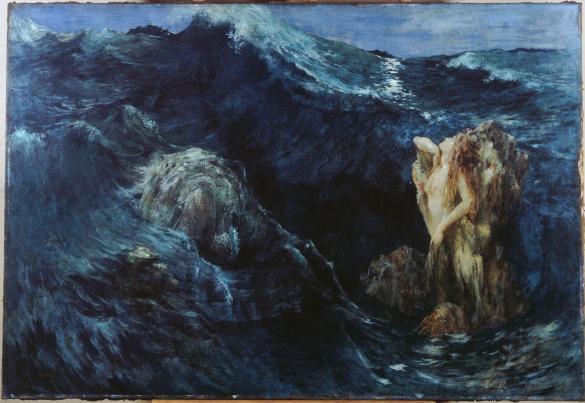
Gateway to Hell: the Fellowship's passage through the West-gate of Moria has been compared to Odysseus's passage between the devouring Scylla and the whirlpool Charybdis. Painting by Ary Renan, 1894

Charles A. Huttar compares the travellers' approach to the dark tunnels of Moria under the Misty Mountains to Odysseus's passage between the devouring Scylla and the whirlpool Charybdis. Huttar likens the "clashing gate" that crashes shut behind the travellers as they enter Moria to the Wandering Rocks that in Greek mythology lie near the opening of the Greek underworld. That realm, also called Hades, the name of its ruler, is where the Greeks thought people went after death, never to return. The gigantic tentacled Watcher in the Water, a monster who guards the gate to the underground realm, parallels the mythical Scylla who attacked Greek mariners.

The gate to Mordor at the Morannon is named the "Black Gate". Tom Shippey writes that the Catholic Tolkien comes very close to allegory and writing about Christian revelation in moments of what Tolkien called "eucatastrophe". When the One Ring is destroyed and Sauron is overthrown for ever, a great eagle comes as messenger to report the glad news. The eagle sings a song that, Shippey notes, sounds very much like Psalms 24 and 33 in the Bible, complete with Authorised Version words like "ye" and "hath". When the eagle sings "and the Black Gate is broken", Shippey writes, the surface meaning is the Gate of the Morannon, but it could "very easily apply to Death and Hell", as in Matthew 16:18. In his view, this degree of double meaning was "deliberate", as the date was 25 March, for the Anglo-Saxons the date of Christ's Crucifixion, and the Annunciation, and the last day of Creation.

From the Eagle's psalm-like song

Sing and rejoice, ye people of the Tower of Guard,
for your watch hath not been in vain,
and the Black Gate is broken,
and your King hath passed through,
and he is victorious.

— "The Steward and the King" (Note: Tolkien 1955, book 6, ch. 5 "The Steward and the King")

The other entrance to Mordor, the dangerous pass of Cirith Ungol, is guarded by the giant spider Shelob. Jane Chance likens Shelob to the guardian of the gateway to Hell in John Milton's Paradise Lost. George H. Thomson similarly compares Shelob to Milton's Sin and Death, noting that they "serve neither God nor Satan but look solely to their own interests", as Shelob does; she is "the Death and Chaos that would overcome all".

== Hellish journeys ==
=== Katabasis ===
Scholars have likened some of the journeys down into dark places to the katabasis of Ancient Greece, a descent into the underworld, followed by a return to the light. Peter Astrup Sundt draws parallels between Beren and Orpheus, or rather between both Beren and Lúthien and the classical character, as it is Lúthien not Beren who has magical powers, and far from playing a passive Eurydice to be rescued, or not, from the underworld, she is the one who goes to sing for Mandos, the Vala who watches over the souls of the dead. Tolkien indeed called the story "a kind of Orpheus-legend in reverse", (Note: Carpenter 2023, Letters #153 to Peter Hastings, September 1954) following the Middle English poem Sir Orfeo. Ben Eldon Stevens adds that Tolkien's retelling contrasts sharply with the myth. Where Orpheus nearly manages to retrieve Eurydice from Hades, the Hell or underworld of classical mythology, Lúthien rescues Beren three times – from Sauron's fortress-prison of Tol-in-Gaurhoth, involving singing; from Morgoth's Angband, with the Silmaril; and by getting Mandos to restore both of them to life. In the original myth, Eurydice meets "a second death", soon followed by the griefstruck Orpheus, whereas Tolkien has Lúthien and Beren enjoy "a second life" after their "resurrection".

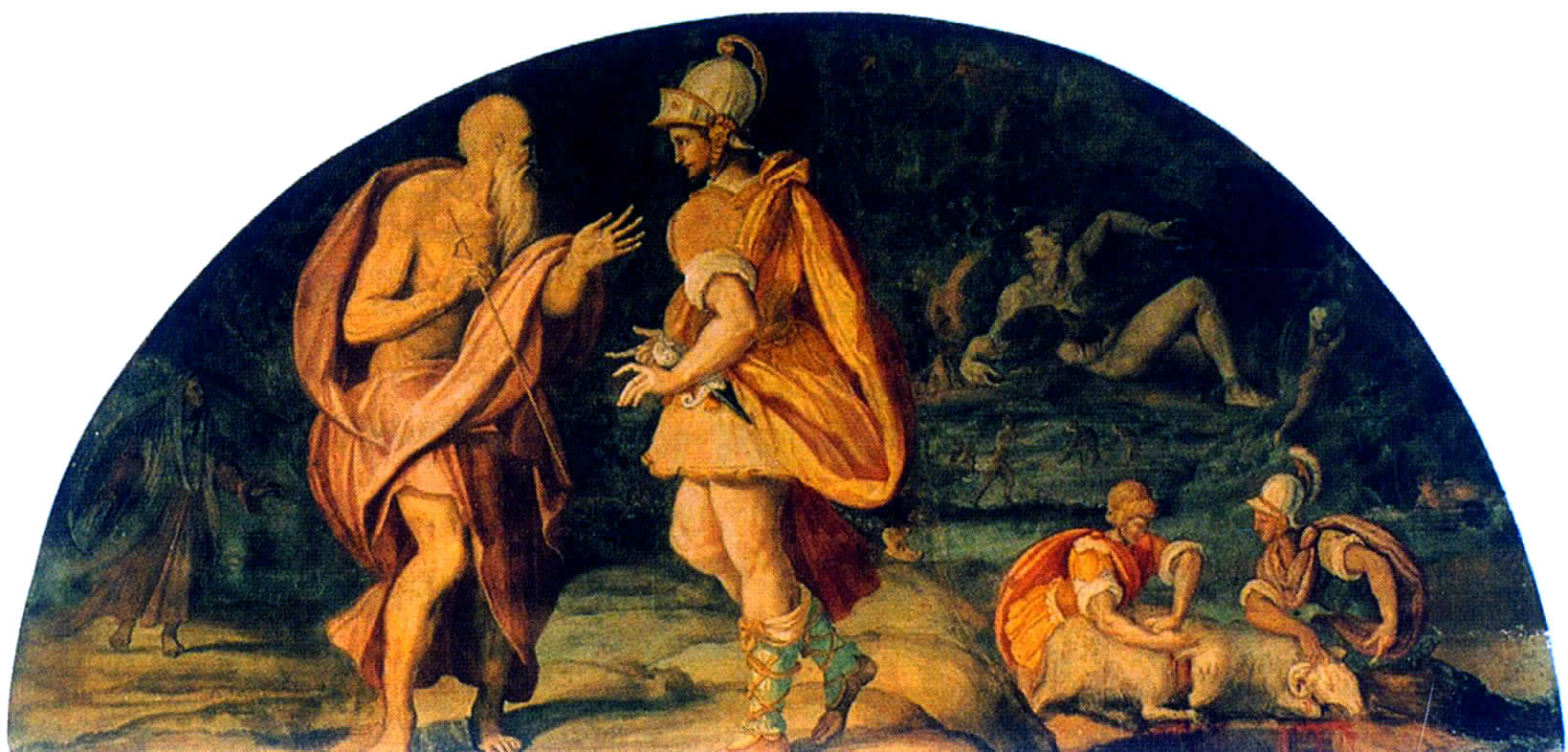
Odysseus consults the soul of the prophet Tiresias in his katabasis, a visit to the Greek underworld, Hades, during Book 11 of The Odyssey. Fresco in the Palazzo Salviati-Quaratesi, Florence, by Alessandro Allori, 1580

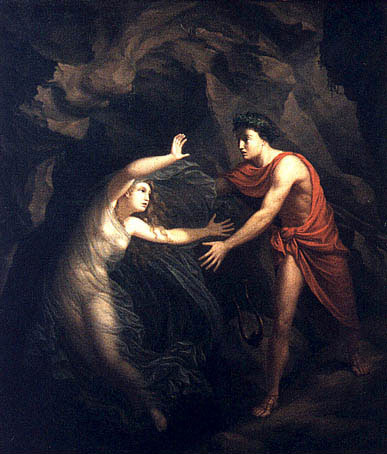
In the classical myth, Orpheus nearly rescues Eurydice from Hades, only for her to die a second death. In Tolkien's version, Lúthien plays Orpheus rather than Eurydice, three times rescuing Beren, and they enjoy a second life together.

=== Harrowing of Hell ===
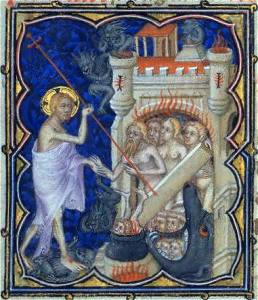
The Harrowing of Hell, Petites Heures, 14th-century illuminated manuscript for John, Duke of Berry

In multiple places in The Silmarillion and The Lord of the Rings, Tolkien echoes and in Robert Steed's words "creatively adapts" the medieval theme of the Harrowing of Hell. The medieval tale holds that Christ spent the time between his crucifixion and resurrection down in Hell, setting the Devil's captives free with the irresistible power of his divine light. The motif, Steed suggests, involves multiple elements: 1) someone imprisoned in darkness 2) a powerful and evil jailor 3) a still more powerful liberator 4) who brings light, and 5) sets the captives free. Steed describes the tale "Of Beren and Lúthien" as an instance, where Lúthien sets Beren free from Sauron's imprisonment. Beren is freed from darkness, Lúthien from despair, so, Steed remarks, both of them take on aspects of Christ:

But Beren coming back to light out of the pit of despair lifted her up, and they looked again upon one another; and the day rising over dark hills shone upon them." (Note: Tolkien 1977, ch. 19 "Of Beren and Lúthien")

Steed suggests that Tom Bombadil's rescuing of the Hobbits from the dark spells of the undead Barrow-wight in The Lord of the Rings (Note: Tolkien 1954a, book 1, ch. 8 "Fog on the Barrow-downs") is another "less immediately obvious" instance of the Harrowing of Hell motif. As Bombadil breaks the spell, he sings "Get out, you old Wight! Vanish in the sunlight!", making him the light-bringing Christ-figure in this case.

Steed offers two further examples of the medieval motif, commenting that they are rather more thoroughly camouflaged. The first is the Wizard Gandalf's freeing of King Théoden of Rohan from the dark insinuations of the traitorous Wormtongue, who has become a servant of the evil Wizard Saruman. In Steed's words "After rebuking Wormtongue, Gandalf raises his staff, at which point thunder rolls and the hall falls into darkness, except for the shining figure of Gandalf himself." (Note: Tolkien 1954, book 3, ch. 6 "The King of the Golden Hall") Steed observes that Théoden was not actually dead, nor actually imprisoned; he was still King, but shut away in the darkness of despair, "reinforced by Wormtongue's crafty counsel".

The final instance is Sam Gamgee's complex liberation of Frodo, involving the devious imprisonment brought about by the monster Gollum, who, pretending to be helpful, leads them to Shelob's dark lair. Shelob stings Frodo, and ties him with her spider-silk. Sam fights off Shelob, and cuts down Frodo's body, thinking him dead, only for a party of Orcs to carry Frodo's body off to the tower of Cirith Ungol, joking darkly amongst themselves that he is still alive. Sam breaks into the tower and rescues Frodo. (Note: Tolkien 1955, book 6, ch. 1 "The Tower of Cirith Ungol") Steed comments that he uses light, in the form of the Phial of Galadriel, in the liberation, both when fighting Shelob and when breaking through the guard of the silent Watchers of the tower's gate. Frodo had not actually been dead, but he looked it, and death was undoubtedly close. Steed comments that Sam was an "odd" fit for the pattern of the Christ-like irresistible force, but in the narrative he indeed plays the part of the "light-bearing liberator at the center of the Harrowing of Hell motif".

Robert Steed's analysis of Middle-earth parallels of the Harrowing of Hell
| Agent of light | Subjects freed | Jailors | Method | As narrated in |
|---|---|---|---|---|
| Christ | Human captives in Hell | The Devil | Power of Divine light | Medieval Christianity |
| Lúthien | Beren | Sauron | Elvish power | The Silmarillion |
| Tom Bombadil | Frodo's party of Hobbits | Barrow-wight | Power of singing | The Lord of the Rings |
| Gandalf | King Théoden of Rohan | Wormtongue's insidious control | Wizard's power | The Lord of the Rings |
| Sam Gamgee | Frodo | Shelob, Orcs of Cirith Ungol | Elvish light of Phial of Galadriel | The Lord of the Rings |

== The Devil ==
One of Tolkien's names for Sauron is the "lidless eye", (Note: Tolkien 1954, book 5, ch. 6 "The Battle of the Pelennor Fields") denoting the "destructive power of the Devil".

Scholars have likened both Melkor and Sauron to the Devil; Jaume Poveda notes that both the dark lords torture their victims, as the Devil is said to do to those in hell. He adds that Tolkien represents the Devil in The Lord of the Rings both as the "lidless eye", and as an embodied character. In Poveda's view, the lidless eye "corresponds to a learned formulation, [which] emphasizes the destructive power of the Devil", whereas the embodied figure corresponds to a popular understanding, someone "less frightening, more stupid and easily deceived." He notes, too, that Sauron has armies formed of Black Riders, fiery-eyed Balrogs, and Orcs, just as the Devil of the Bible leads "legions" of demons, and that one of the Devil's "traditional embodiments" is as a rider dressed in black on a black horse. In keeping with having Sauron as the Devil, Saruman fits the pattern, Poveda writes, of "the man who sells his soul to the Devil in exchange for earthly power and wealth". He notes, too. that the Old English word orc carried the meaning "devil", and that Tolkien depicts the Orcs as "creatures that are possessed by the devil. They worship him. Their bodies have been deformed from torture and suffering. Like traditional representations of the Devil, the orc's complexion is dark and his eyes are as live coal."

== Sources ==
- Carpenter, Humphrey, ed. (2023) [1981]. The Letters of J. R. R. Tolkien: Revised and Expanded Edition. New York: HarperCollins. ISBN 978-0-35-865298-4.
- Chance, Jane (1980) [1979]. Tolkien's Art: 'A Mythology for England'. Papermac. ISBN 978-0-333-29034-7.
- Christopher, Joe R. (2012). "The Journeys To and From Purgatory Island: A Dantean Allusion at the End of C. S. Lewis's 'The Nameless Isle'". In Khoddam, Salwa; Hall, Mark R.; Fisher, Jason (eds.). C. S. Lewis and the Inklings: Discovering Hidden Truth. Cambridge Scholars Publishing. ISBN 978-1-4438-4431-4.
- Costabile, Giovanni Carmine (April 2024). "Orpheus and the Harrowing of Hell in the Tale of Beren and Lúthien". Mythlore. Article 5.
- Ekman, Stefan (2010). "Satan, Sauron, and Sundry Dark Lords: Evil Incarnate in Fantasy" (PDF). Tolkiens Arda. Archived (PDF) from the original on 23 August 2010.
- Freeman, Austin (2020). "Flesh, World, Devil: The Nature of Evil in J.R.R. Tolkien". Journal of Inklings Studies. 10 (2): 139–171. doi:10.3366/ink.2020.0077.
- Huttar, Charles A. (1975). "Hell and the City: Tolkien and the Traditions of Western Literature". In Lobdell, Jared (ed.). A Tolkien Compass. Open Court. pp. 121–122. ISBN 978-0875483030. "Clearly Charybdis is yet another route to hell."
- Oberhelman, David D. (2013) [2007]. "Angband". In Drout, Michael D. C. (ed.). J.R.R. Tolkien Encyclopedia: Scholarship and Critical Assessment. The J. R. R. Tolkien Encyclopedia: Scholarship and Critical Assessment. Routledge. pp. 17–18. ISBN 978-0-415-86511-1.
- Petty, Anne C. (2003). Tolkien in the Land of Heroes: Discovering the Human Spirit. Cold Spring Press. ISBN 978-1-89297599-7.
- Poveda, Jaume Albero (2005). "Villains and the representations of evil in J.R.R. Tolkien's fiction of Middle-Earth". Brno Studies in English. 31 (1): 155–174. hdl:11222.digilib/104220. ISBN 978-80-210-3928-5.
- Shippey, Tom (2005) [1982]. The Road to Middle-Earth: How J. R. R. Tolkien Created a New Mythology (Third ed.). HarperCollins. ISBN 978-0-261-10275-0.
- Steed, Robert (2017). "The Harrowing of Hell Motif in Tolkien's Legendarium". Mallorn (58): 6–9.
- Stevens, Ben Eldon (2021). "Middle-earth as Underworld: From Katabasis to Eucatastrophe". In Williams, Hamish (ed.). Tolkien and the Classical World. Walking Tree Publishers. ISBN 978-3-905703-45-0.
- Sundt, Peter Astrup (2021). "Orpheus and Eurydice in Tolkien's Orphic Middle-earth". In Williams, Hamish (ed.). Tolkien and the Classical World. Walking Tree Publishers. pp. 165–189. ISBN 978-3-905703-45-0.
- Thomson, George H. (1967). ""The Lord of the Rings": The Novel as Traditional Romance". Wisconsin Studies in Contemporary Literature. 8 (1): 43–59. doi:10.2307/1207129. JSTOR 1207129.
- Tolkien, J. R. R. (1954a). The Fellowship of the Ring. The Lord of the Rings. Boston: Houghton Mifflin. OCLC 9552942.
- Tolkien, J. R. R. (1954). The Two Towers. The Lord of the Rings. Boston: Houghton Mifflin. OCLC 1042159111.
- Tolkien, J. R. R. (1955). The Return of the King. The Lord of the Rings. Boston: Houghton Mifflin. OCLC 519647821.
- Tolkien, J. R. R. (1977). Christopher Tolkien (ed.). The Silmarillion. Boston: Houghton Mifflin. ISBN 978-0-395-25730-2.
- Wright, Thomas (1873). A second volume of vocabularies. privately printed. p. 63.
