= Tolkien and the classical world =

Effect on Tolkien's legendarium

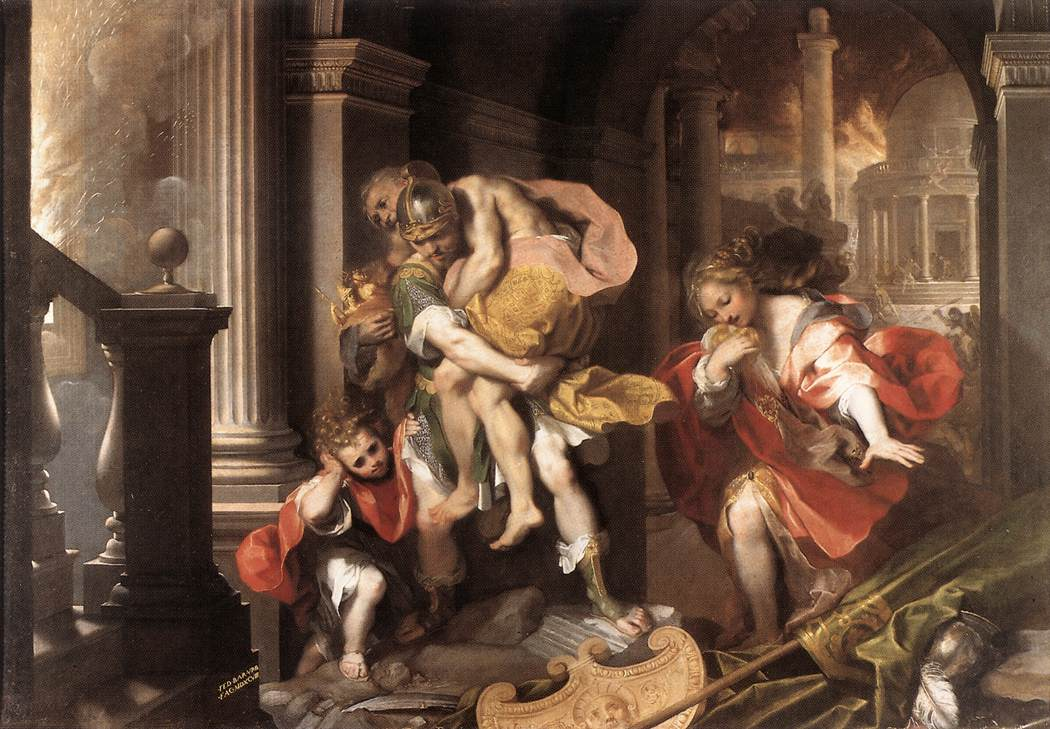
In Roman legend, Aeneas escapes the ruin of Troy, while in Tolkien's legendarium, Elendil escapes Númenor. Painting Aeneas Flees Burning Troy by Federico Barocci, 1598

J. R. R. Tolkien derived the characters, stories, places, and languages of Middle-earth from many sources, especially medieval ones. Tolkien and the classical world have been linked by scholars, and by Tolkien himself. The suggested influences include the pervasive classical themes of divine intervention and decline and fall in Middle-earth; the splendour of the Atlantis-like lost island kingdom of Númenor; the Troy-like fall of Gondolin; the Rome-like stone city of Minas Tirith in Gondor; magical rings with parallels to the One Ring; and the echoes of the tale of Lúthien and Beren with the myth of Orpheus descending to the underworld. Other possible connections have been suggested by scholars.

Tolkien stated that he wanted to create a mythology evocative of England, not of Italy. Scholars have noted aspects of his work, such as the plants of Ithilien, which are clearly Mediterranean but not specifically classical.

Tolkien's fiction was brought to a new audience by Peter Jackson's film version of The Lord of the Rings. This in turn influenced the portrayal of the classical world in several later films, such as the 2004 Troy.

== Context ==
J. R. R. Tolkien was a scholar of English literature, a philologist and medievalist interested in language and poetry from the Middle Ages, especially that of Anglo-Saxon England and Northern Europe. His professional knowledge of works such as Beowulf shaped his fictional world of Middle-earth, including his fantasy novel The Lord of the Rings. This did not prevent him from making use of classical sources as well. The classical world has been defined as "the history, literature, myths, philosophy, and society of ancient Greece and Rome". It has been argued that since Tolkien's mythology for England was largely medieval, he needed a classical setting to provide a suitable impression of historical depth.

== Classical themes ==
=== Decline and fall ===
The classical scholar Giuseppe Pezzini writes that "narratives of decline" are common in the literature of ancient Greece and Rome. This is seen in the writings of both Hesiod and Ovid. Pezzini sees the decline of Tolkien's world of Arda from its First Age "filled with Joy and Light" down to its "Twilight" Third Age as echoing the classical theme of decline from the Golden Age. Ross Clare analyses how Tolkien's chronicles of the decline and fall of his island paradise of Númenor might have been influenced by classical frameworks of decline and fall, as provided by the historians Herodotus, Thucydides, and Suetonius. Clare sees Athenian decline as entailing a three-stage process, like that of Númenor. Hamish Williams regards the narrative of decline and fall in Númenor as a thought-experiment exercise recalling Plato's philosophical arguments, where certain virtues and ideals (sophocracy, moderation, piety, etc.) are emphasized through their loss.

Tolkien built a process of decline and fall in Middle-earth into both The Silmarillion and The Lord of the Rings. The pattern is expressed in several ways, including the splintering of the light provided by the Creator, Eru Iluvatar, into progressively smaller parts; (Note: Tolkien 1977, "Ainulindalë") the fragmentation of languages and peoples, especially the Elves, who are split into many groups; the successive falls, starting with that of the angelic spirit Melkor, and followed by the destruction of the two Lamps of Middle-earth and then of the Two Trees of Valinor, and the cataclysmic fall of Númenor. Tolkien's use of the theme cannot be said to be exclusively classical; The Lord of the Rings shares the sense of impending destruction found in Norse mythology, where even the gods will perish. The Dark Lord Sauron may be defeated, but that will entail the fading and departure of the Elves, leaving the world to Men, to industrialise and to pollute, however much Tolkien regretted the fact.

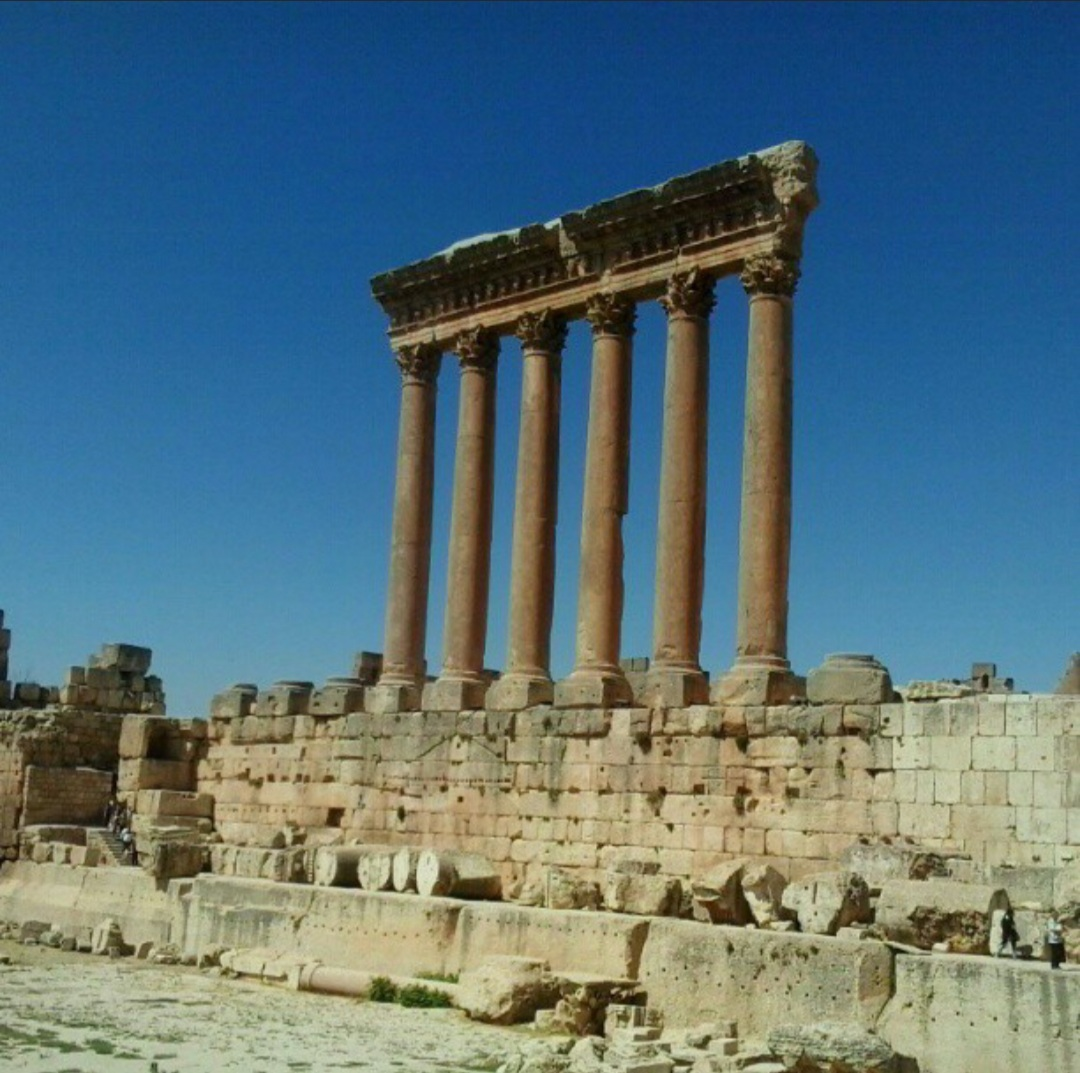
Decline and fall: the shattered ruins of the Roman city at Baalbek

=== Divine intervention ===
Pezzini further states that the pattern of divine intervention in The Silmarillion and The Lord of the Rings echoes that in classical epics such as those of Homer, in 8th century BC Greece, and Virgil, in 1st century BC Rome; Tolkien directly linked The Lord of the Rings to their poems in one of his letters. (Note: Carpenter 2023, #156 to Robert Murray, 4 November 1954) He notes that Tolkien likened his Valar to "the gods of 'traditional' 'higher' mythology" – meaning, as Richard Purtill explained, the Roman or Greek pantheons, or to an extent also the Æsir of Norse mythology – though with definite differences. In particular, in his early work The Cottage of Lost Play he equated the classical gods to the Valar. Pezzini writes that in The Silmarillion,

the Valar are, in fact, full-fledged epic gods: they speak, they suffer, they desire, they fight, and, above all, they deliberate on the fates of elves and humans (in councils [like those] in Homer and Virgil) and interact with them in order to bring about their providential plans (individual or collective).

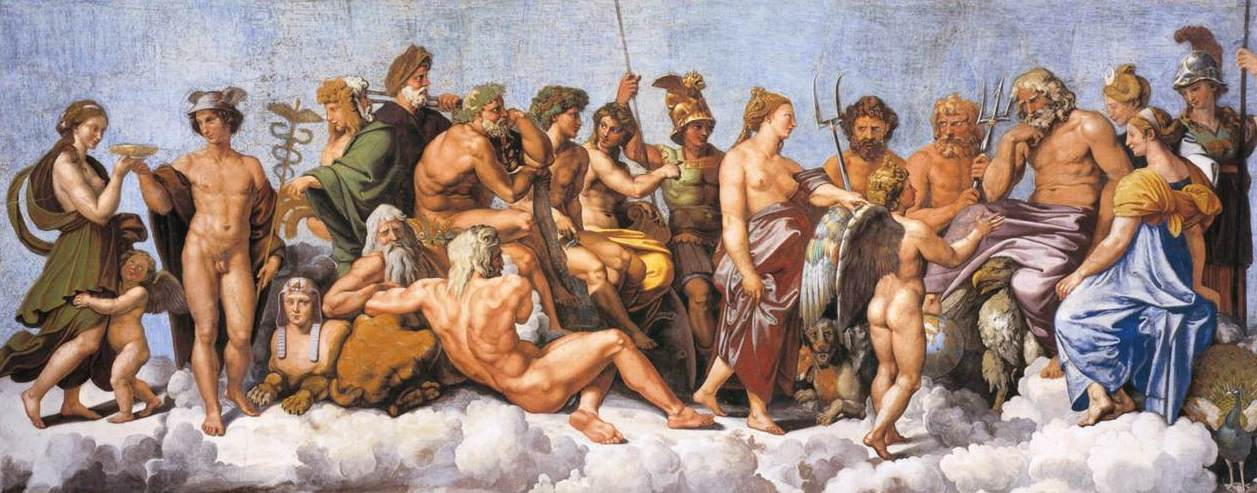
Like the pantheon of Greek gods, Tolkien's Valar behave as a group,
and act in Middle-earth through what appears as luck, or fate.

Just as with the interactions of the classical gods with mortals, the Valar's interactions with Middle-earth can take multiple forms: direct appearances or theophanies; through messengers such as the Wizard Gandalf, sent by the Valar; through entities in nature, such as eagles or mists; through dreams; through inspiration; and perhaps also through omens. Pezzini writes that Tolkien's approach, that "the gods' messages can be presented as warnings, and not threats or orders and, above all, that they can be ignored by non-divine characters are both unusual scenarios in classical epic". Further points of difference are that if the Valar choose to intervene, they usually do it overtly, unlike the classical gods; and they do so out of a "desire for fellowship" which is lacking in classical accounts. Pezzini comments, too, that divine inspiration is typically a good thing in Tolkien's writings and a bad thing in classical accounts.

Giuseppe Pezzini's analysis of covert divine intervention in Middle-earth
Type	Classical examples from the Aeneid	Middle-earth examples from The Silmarillion
Theophany	Mercury appears to Aeneas	Ulmo appears to Turgon and Tuor
Through messengers	Jupiter sends orders to Aeneas via Mercury	Ulmo sends Tuor to warn Gondolin
Through entities in nature	Juno arranges a storm to bring Dido and Aeneas together	Manwë sends Thorondor, King of Eagles, to help Fingon rescue Maedhros
Through dreams	Mercury appears to Aeneas in a dream, telling him to leave Carthage	Ulmo warns Turgon and Finrod in dreams
Through inspiration	Jupiter inspires Dido to be hospitable to Aeneas	Ulmo inspires Tuor to leave his father's land

The Valar intervene, too, in The Lord of the Rings, but always covertly. Pezzini takes the example of the wounding of the Orc captain Grishnákh by a fateful arrow in the dark, soon followed by his death.

Giuseppe Pezzini's analysis of a divine intervention in The Lord of the Rings
Component	Aeneid	The Lord of the Rings
Event	Aeneas is wounded by an arrow	Grishnákh is wounded by an arrow; he is then killed with a spear
An arrow is sent, ambiguously	"unknown what chance or what god" (12.321)	"it was aimed with skill, or guided by fate" (Note: Tolkien 1954, book 3, ch. 3 "The Uruk-hai")
Implied agent	A god	The Valar
Purpose	The god's own	To protect humble mortals, so as to fulfil the design of "the Valar, under the One"

== Specific parallels ==
=== Númenor-Atlantis ===
Plato's 4th century BC tale of decline in Kritias, from the "decadent magnificence" of Atlantis to the humdrum life of Athens, is "unambiguously and intimately" linked to Tolkien's Númenor, since Tolkien made the comparison himself and actually wrote of "Númenor-Atlantis" in his letters. He had considered using this in a time travel novel. (Note: Carpenter 2023, letters 131, 154, 154, 156, 227, 252) The destruction of Númenor earned it the Quenya name Atalantë "the Downfallen"; (Note: Tolkien 1977, "Akallabêth") Tolkien described his invention of this additional allusion to Atlantis as a happy accident when he realized that the Quenya root talat- "to fall" could be incorporated into a name for Númenor. (Note: Carpenter 2023, letter 257 to Christopher Bretherton, 16 July 1964)

The commentator Charles Delattre states that Tolkien's tale of Númenor is a retelling of the myth of Atlantis, the only drowned island in ancient literature. Multiple details align: it began as a perfect world, geometrically laid out to reflect its balance and harmony; it abounds in valuable minerals; and it has unmatched power, with a strong fleet able to project control far beyond its shores, like ancient Athens. Númenor's pride, too, writes Delattre, matches the hubris of Plato's Atlantis; and its downfall recalls the destruction of Atlantis.

Map of Arda in the Second Age, showing Númenor in the Great Sea, Belegaer, between Aman and Middle-earth.

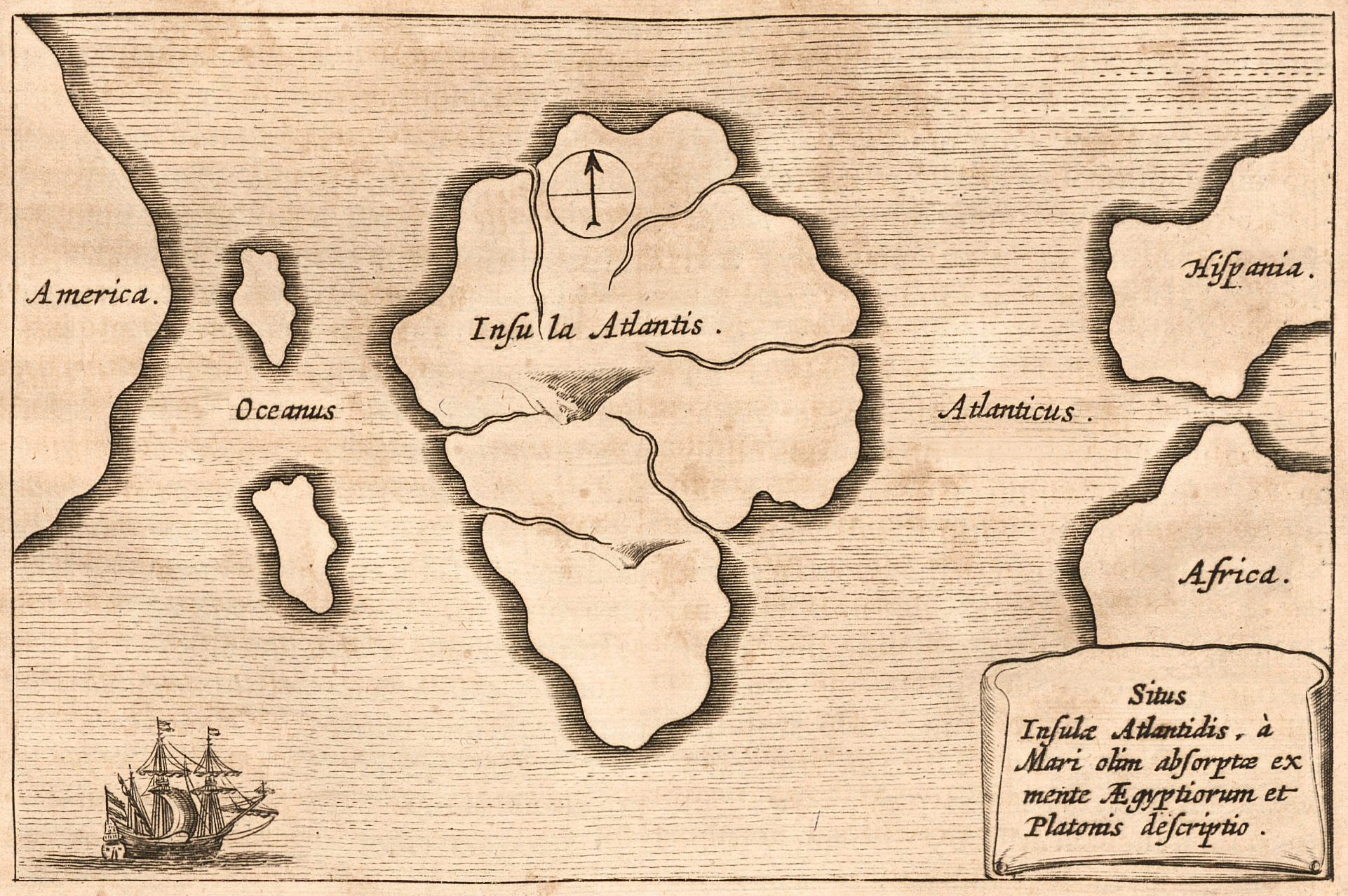
Tolkien wrote of Númenor as Atlantis. Athanasius Kircher's 1669 map (here, inverted to place North at the top) places Atlantis between America and Europe (Hispania, Spain).

Michael Kleu writes that Tolkien made "playful use of Greek myths related to Atlas", possibly including pre-Platonic tradition. Kleu comments that the playfulness extends, in The Notion Club Papers, (Note: Tolkien 1992, "The Notion Club Papers", p. 249) to making Plato's 2,000 year old version derive from the "real" Downfall of Númenor, which in Tolkien's chronology took place some 7,000 years before Plato.

Michael Kleu's analysis of parallels between Plato's Atlantis and Númenor
Component	Atlantis	Númenor
Location	In the ocean to the west of Europe	In the ocean to the west of Middle-earth
Resources	"extraordinar[il]y fruitful and rich in resources and wildlife"	
Geometry	A mountain at the island's centre, with a temple at its top	
Temple	A giant temple to Poseidon, covered in silver	A giant temple to Melkor, roofed in silver
First King	Atlas, born of immortals (the Titan Iapetus and the Oceanid Asia)	Elros, descendant of immortal Elves and Maiar
Civilisation	Greatest maritime power, conquering lands to the east	
Decline	Moral decay and arrogance leads to destruction of the island	
Destruction	Fleet sinks, soldiers swallowed by the earth	

=== Gondolin-Troy ===
Tolkien scholars have compared the fall of Gondolin to the sack of Troy, noting that both cities were famed for their walls, and likening Tolkien's tale to Virgil's Aeneid. Both have frame stories, situated long after the events they narrate; both have "gods" (Tolkien's Valar) in the action; and both involve an escape. David Greenman compares the actions of Tolkien's quest-heroes to those of Aeneas and Odysseus.

David Greenman's analysis of classical "quest-hero" themes
Event	Classical quest-hero	The Lord of the Rings protagonists
Escape from wreck of a kingdom, creation of a new one	Aeneas, escaping the ruin of Troy	Tuor in the fall of Gondolin
Return to ravaged home, scour it clean	Odysseus on his long-delayed return to Ithaca	The four Hobbits in "The Scouring of the Shire"

Greenman compares and contrasts Idril's part in the story to Cassandra and Helen of Troy, two prominent female figures in accounts of the Trojan War: like the prophetess, Idril had a premonition of impending danger and like Helen, her beauty played a major role in instigating Maeglin's betrayal of Gondolin, which ultimately led to its downfall and ruin. Conversely, Greenman notes that Idril's advice to enact a contingency plan for a secret escape route out of Gondolin was heeded by her people, unlike the warning of Cassandra; and that Idril had always rejected Maeglin's advances and remained faithful to Tuor, unlike Helen who left her husband King Menelaus of Sparta for Prince Paris of Troy.

Alexander Bruce writes that Tolkien's tale parallels Virgil's account, but varies the story. Thus, Morgoth attacks while Gondolin's guard is lowered during a great feast, whereas the Trojans were celebrating the Greeks' apparent retreat, with the additional note of treachery. The Trojan Horse carried the Greeks into Troy, where they set fire to it, paralleled by the fire-serpents which carried "Balrogs in hundreds" into Gondolin. Tolkien's serpents are matched by the great serpents with "burning eyes, fiery and suffused with blood, their tongues a-flicker out of hissing maws" which kill the high priest Laocoön and his sons. Aeneas and his wife Creusa become separated during their escape; her ghost pleads with him to leave when he searches for her, and he travels to Italy; in contrast, Tuor and Idril escape to Sirion together, eventually sailing from there to Valinor. Marco Cristini adds that both cities are fatally attacked during a feast; their heroes both leave their wives to fight, and both see their kings die. Cristini comments further that "The most evident analogy is perhaps the behaviour of Creusa and Idril, who clasp the knees of their husbands to prevent them from joining again the battle when all hope is lost." Scholars have noted that Tolkien himself drew classical parallels for the assault, writing that "Nor Bablon, nor Ninwi, nor the towers of Trui, nor all the many takings of Rûm that is greatest among Men, saw such terror as fell that day upon Amon Gwareth".

J. K. Newman likens the scene in which Sam Gamgee reflects on what fiction is, and how he and Frodo are in a tale or will be put into one, to Virgil's account of Aeneas looking at his own tale: "There in order he sees the battles fought at Troy... 'Yes', he said, 'this tale will bring you some yet mysterious salvation'...heaving many a sigh... He even recognised himself in the melee with the Greek champions."

Tolkien appears to have based one scene on another classical source, Euripides' play The Trojan Women. Maeglin tries to throw Idril's son Eärendil from the city wall, just as Hector's son Astyanax is thrown down from Troy's walls. Tolkien changes the outcome: Eärendil resists, and Tuor appears just in time to rescue him by throwing Maeglin from the walls instead.

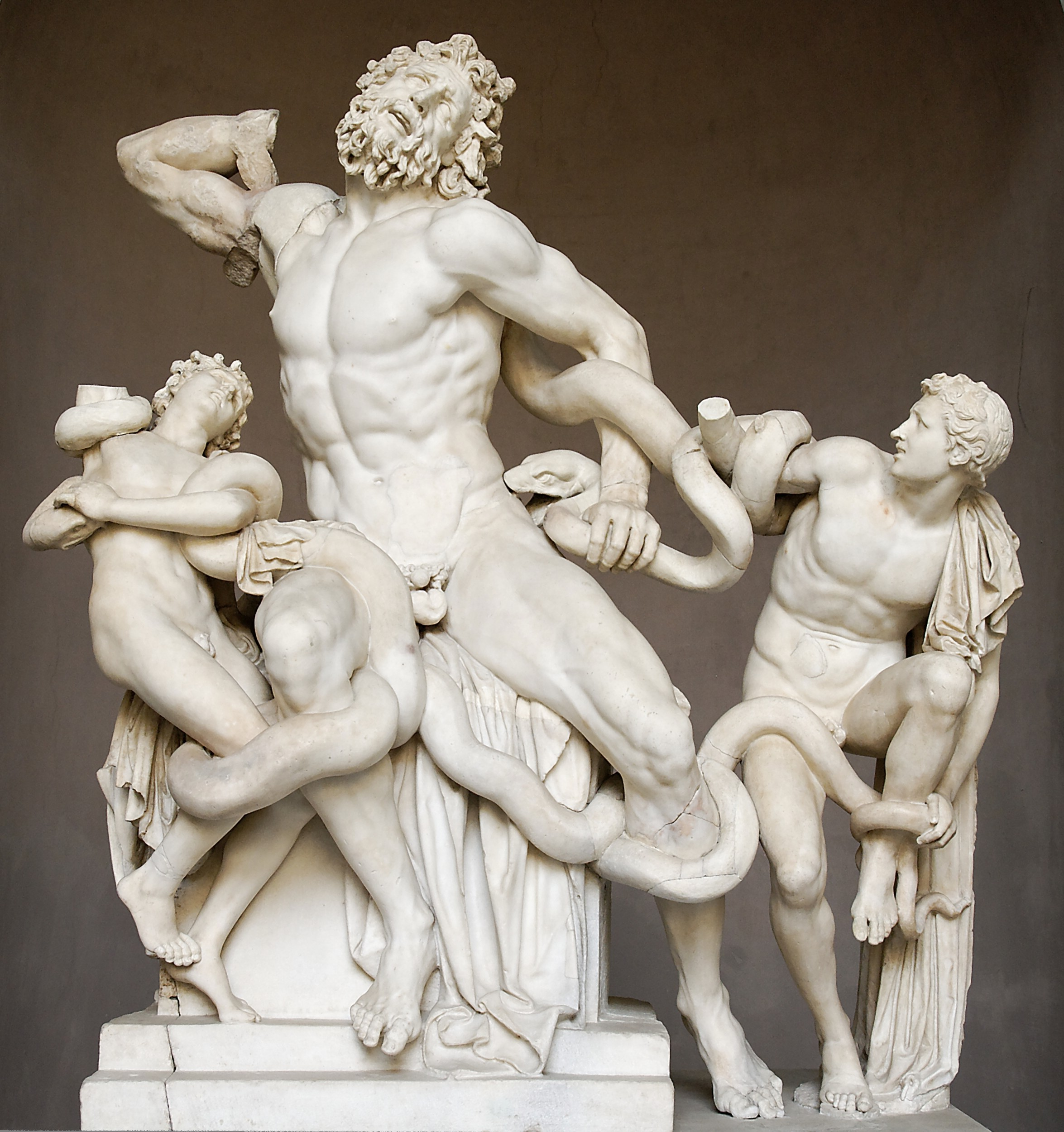
Tolkien's fire-serpents are paralleled by Virgil's great serpents that kill the Trojan priest Laocoön and his sons
in the fall of Troy.

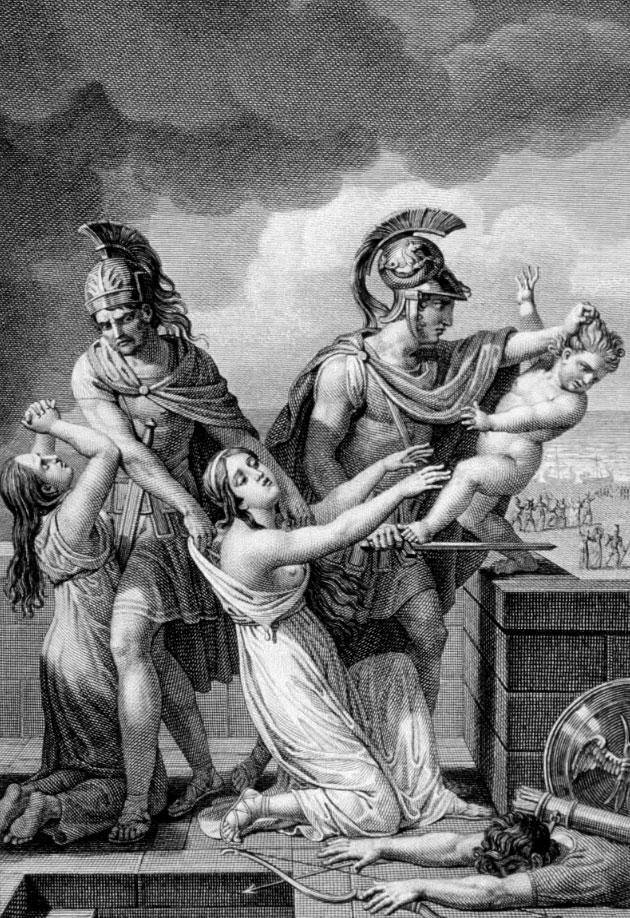
Maeglin's failed attempt to throw Eärendil from the city walls contrasts with Euripides' account of the throwing of the young Astyanax from the walls of Troy.

=== Gondor-Rome ===
Pippin gazed in growing wonder at the great stone city, vaster and more splendid than anything that he had dreamed of; greater and stronger than Isengard, and far more beautiful. Yet it was in truth falling year by year into decay; and already it lacked half the men that could have dwelt at ease there. In every street they passed some great house or court over whose door and arched gates were carved many fair letters of strange and ancient shapes: names Pippin guessed of great men and kindreds that had once dwelt there; and yet now they were silent, and no footsteps rang on their wide pavements, nor voice was heard in their halls, nor any face looked out from door or empty window.

— The Lord of the Rings, book 5, ch. 1 "Minas Tirith"

Sandra Ballif Straubhaar, in The J. R. R. Tolkien Encyclopedia, discusses the real-world prototypes of Gondor. She writes that like the Normans, their founders the Númenóreans arrived "from across the sea", and that Prince Imrahil's armour with a "burnished vambrace" recalls late-medieval plate armour. Against this theory, she notes Tolkien's direction of readers to Egypt and Byzantium. Recalling that Tolkien located Minas Tirith at the latitude of Florence, she and other scholars suggest that possibly the strongest likenesses are with ancient Rome. She identifies several parallels: Aeneas, from Troy, and Elendil, from Númenor, both survive the destruction of their home countries; Aeneas's descendants, the brothers Romulus and Remus, found Rome, while the brothers Isildur and Anárion found the Númenórean kingdoms of Gondor and Arnor in Middle-earth; and both Gondor and Rome experienced lengthy "decadence and decline".

Judy Ann Ford adds in Tolkien Studies that Gondor is distinctive in Middle-earth in having cities built of stone: "the only culture within [the Anglo-Saxons'] historical memory that had made places like Minas Tirith was the Roman Empire." She comments that Tolkien's account of Gondor can be seen as the decline and fall of Rome, but "with a happy ending", as it "somehow withstood the onslaught of armies from the east, and ... was restored to glory." She finds multiple likenesses between the cities.

Judy Ann Ford's comparison of Gondor and Rome
Story element	Ancient Rome	Gondor
Capital moved under threat	From Rome to Ravenna in 402 AD	From Osgiliath to Minas Tirith
Layout	Walled city, built of stone	Seven walls of indomitable stone
Architecture	Ravenna's tall Basilica of San Vitale	The towering stone Hall of Ecthelion
Southern rivals who use war-elephants	Carthaginians	Haradrim
Devastating disease outbreak	Antonine Plague	Great Plague
Language becomes a lingua franca	Latin	Westron

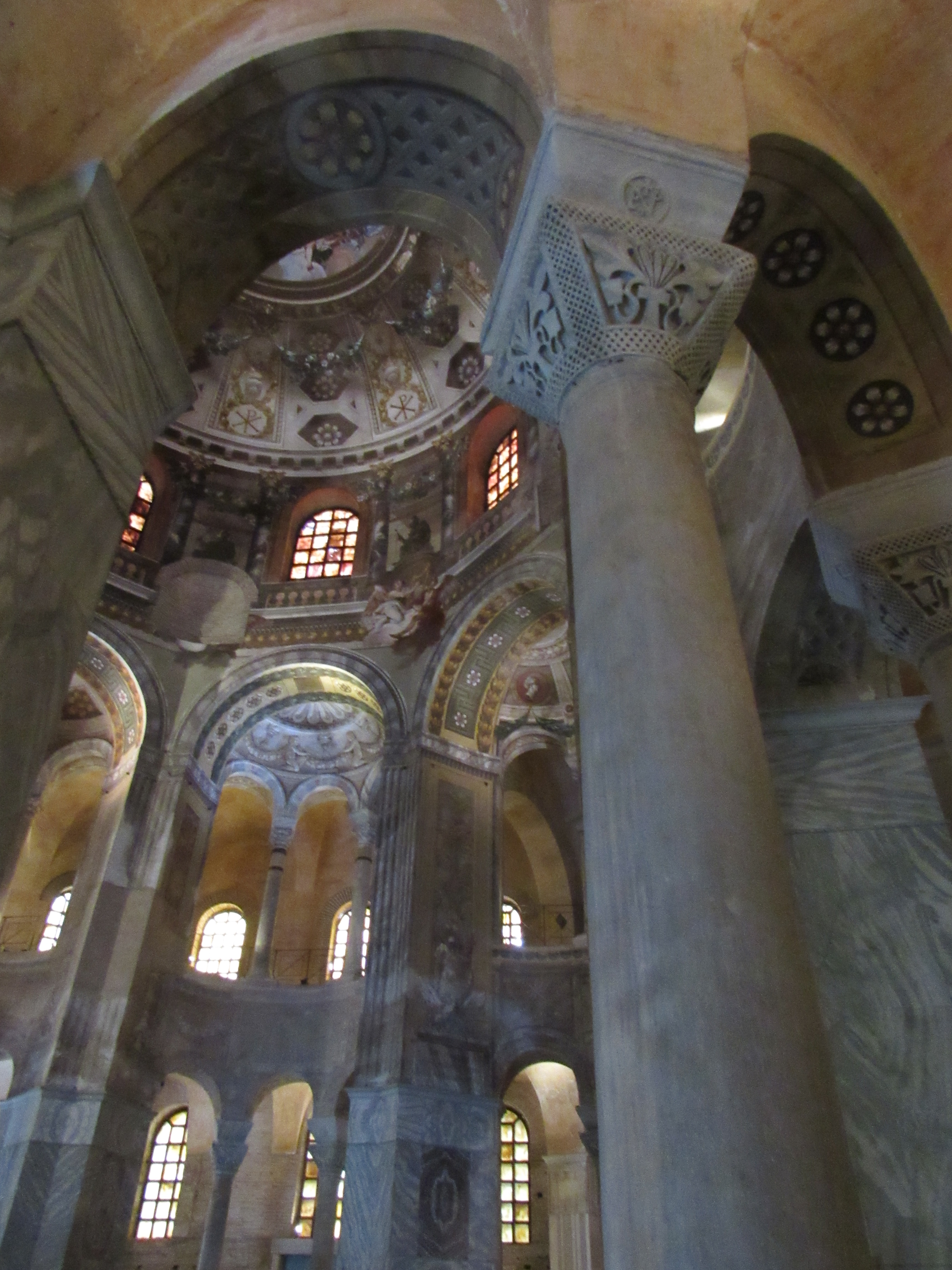
Minas Tirith's towering stone hall of Ecthelion has been compared to Ravenna's 6th century Basilica of San Vitale.

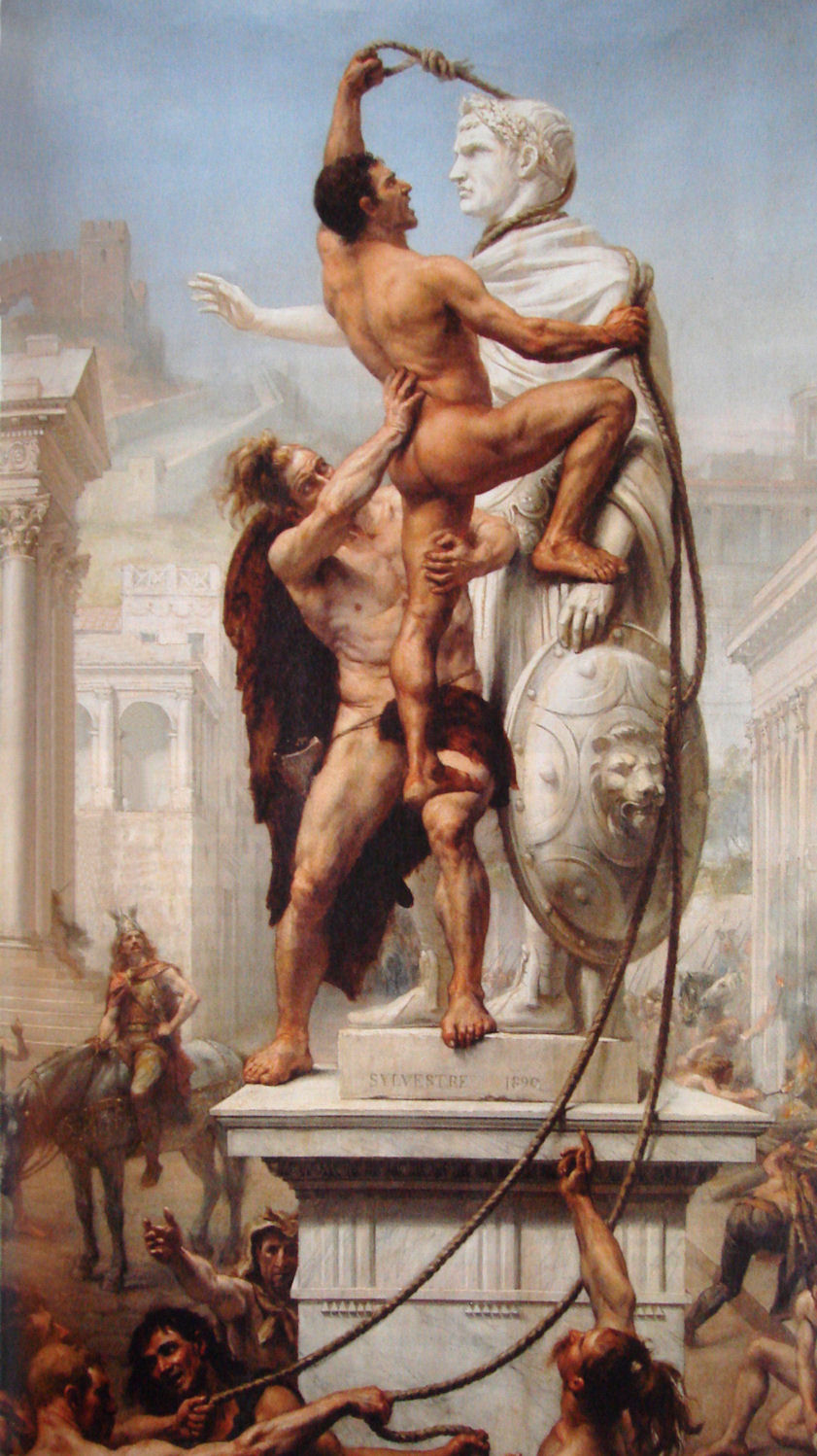
The 410 AD sack of Rome by Alaric's Visigoths contrasts with Gondor's siege and rescue in the battle of the Pelennor Fields:
Rome "with a happy ending".

=== The One Ring–The Ring of Gyges ===
Plato's Republic tells the story of the Ring of Gyges that gave its owner the power of invisibility, as Tolkien's One Ring did. In so doing, it created a moral dilemma, enabling people to commit injustices without fearing they would be caught. In contrast, Tolkien's Ring actively exerts an evil force that destroys the morality of the wearer. (Note: Tolkien 1954a, book 1, ch. 2 "The Shadow of the Past")

Scholars including Frederick A. de Armas note parallels between Plato's and Tolkien's rings. De Armas suggests that both Bilbo and Gyges, going into deep dark places to find hidden treasure, may have "undergone a Catabasis", a psychological journey to the Underworld.

Frederick A. de Armas's comparison of Plato's and Tolkien's rings
Story element	Plato's Republic	Tolkien's Middle-earth
Ring's power	Invisibility	Invisibility, and corruption of the wearer
Discovery	Gyges finds ring in a deep chasm	Bilbo finds ring in a deep cave
First use	Gyges ravishes the Queen, kills the King, becomes King of Lydia (a bad purpose)	Bilbo puts ring on by accident, is surprised Gollum does not see him, uses it to escape danger (a good purpose)
Moral result	Total failure	Bilbo emerges strengthened

The Tolkien scholar Eric Katz writes that "Plato argues that such [moral] corruption will occur, but Tolkien shows us this corruption through the thoughts and actions of his characters". Plato argues that immoral life is no good as it corrupts one's soul. So, Katz states, according to Plato a moral person has peace and happiness, and would not use a Ring of Power. In Katz's view, Tolkien's story "demonstrate[s] various responses to the question posed by Plato: would a just person be corrupted by the possibility of almost unlimited power?" The question is answered in different ways: the monster Gollum is weak, quickly corrupted, and finally destroyed; Boromir, son of the Steward of Gondor, begins virtuous but like Plato's Gyges is corrupted "by the temptation of power" from the Ring, even if he wants to use it for good, but redeems himself by defending the hobbits to his own death; the "strong and virtuous" Galadriel, who sees clearly what she would become if she accepted the ring, and rejects it; the immortal Tom Bombadil, exempt from the Ring's corrupting power and from its gift of invisibility; Sam who in a moment of need faithfully uses the ring, but is not seduced by its vision of "Samwise the Strong, Hero of the Age"; and finally Frodo who is gradually corrupted, but is saved by his earlier mercy to Gollum, and Gollum's desperation for the Ring. Katz concludes that Tolkien's answer to Plato's "Why be moral?" is "to be yourself".

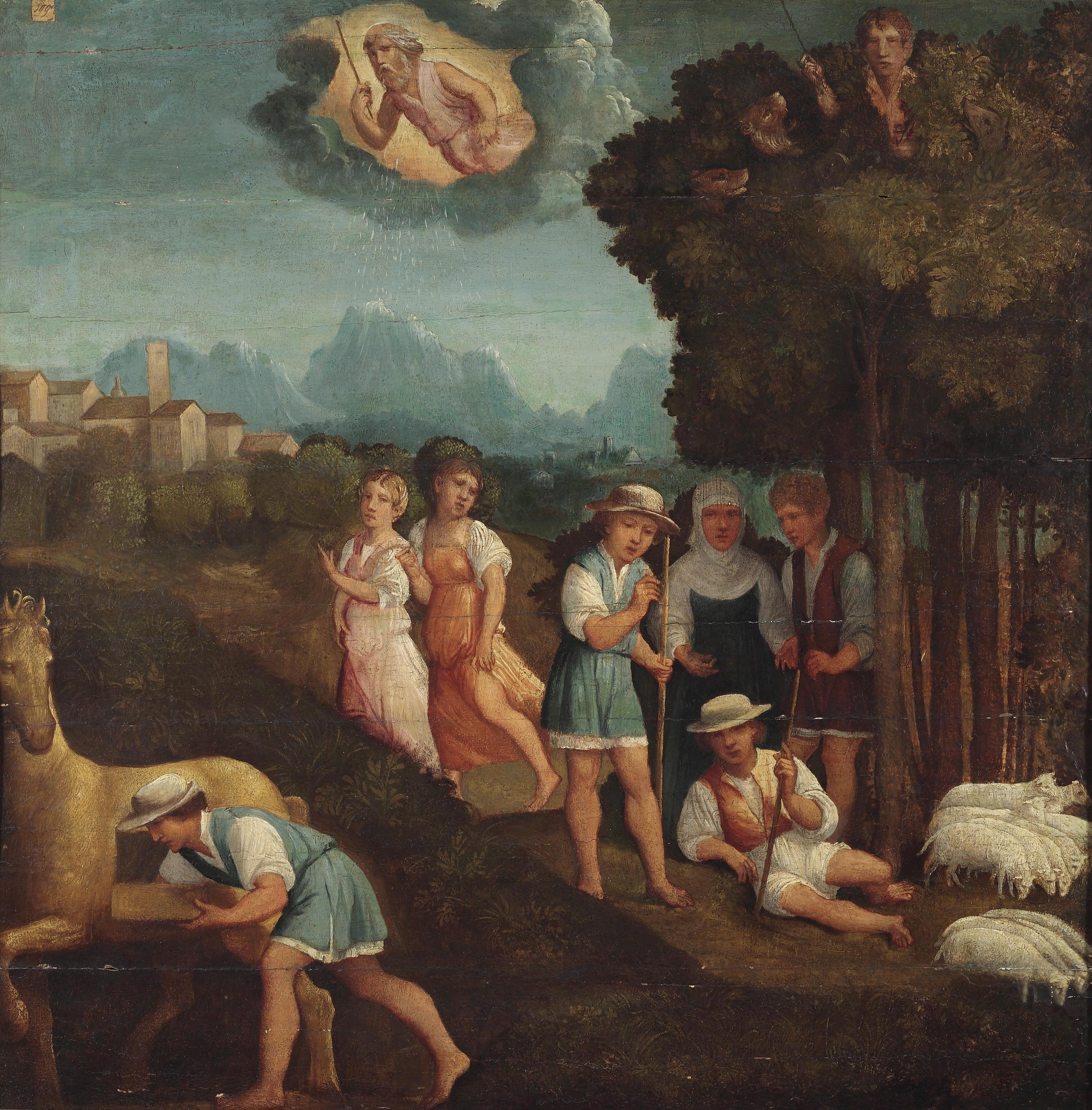
The shepherd Gyges of Plato's Republic finds the magic ring, setting up a moral dilemma. Ferrara, 16th century

=== Beren and Lúthien–Orpheus ===
Elena Capra writes that Tolkien made use of the medieval poem Sir Orfeo, based on the classical tale of Orpheus and Eurydice but transposed to England, both for The Hobbit's Elvish kingdom, and for his story in The Silmarillion of Beren and Lúthien. That in turn influenced his "Tale of Aragorn and Arwen". In Capra's view, Sir Orfeo's key ingredient was the political connection "between the recovery of the main character's beloved and the return to royal responsibility."

Peter Astrup Sundt draws parallels between Beren and Orpheus, or rather between both Beren and Lúthien and the classical character, as it is Lúthien not Beren who has magical powers, and far from playing a passive Eurydice, she too goes to sing for Mandos, the Vala who watches over the souls of the dead.

Peter Astrup Sundt's parallels between Beren/Lúthien and Orpheus
Action/theme	Beren	Orpheus	Lúthien
Bond with nature	Yes	Yes	Yes
Desperate search for lover	Yes (Lay of Leithian)	Yes	
Repeated calling of her name	Tinuviel! Tinuviel!	Eurydicen ... Eurydicen (Virgil's Georgics)	
Katabasis, descent into underworld	"Go[es] down" into Doriath, the "perilous, terrible, forbidden" city	Yes	
Magical, musical mother		The muse Calliope	The Maia Melian
Powerful song		Yes	Yes
Magical powers		Yes	Yes
Pleads for return of lover		To Pluto and Proserpine	To Mandos

Ben Eldon Stevens maps out similar parallels, but adds that Tolkien's retelling contrasts sharply with the myth. Where Orpheus nearly manages to retrieve Eurydice from Hades, Lúthien rescues Beren three times – from Sauron's fortress-prison of Tol-in-Gaurhoth, involving singing; from Morgoth's Angband, with the Silmarils; and by getting Mandos to restore both of them to life. Stevens comments that in the original myth, Eurydice meets "a second death", soon followed by the griefstruck Orpheus, whereas Tolkien has Lúthien and Beren enjoy "a second life". Stevens notes that Tolkien evidently agreed that this version, ending with a resurrection, embodied a "religious difference" from the Greek myth, as he had described this in one of his letters as "a kind of Orpheus-legend in reverse, but one of Pity not of Inexorability". (Note: Carpenter 2023, #153, September 1954 to Peter Hastings)

Tolkien used the medieval poem Sir Orfeo, which begins
"Orfeo was a king
In Inglond an heiȝe lording"
for his Tale of Aragorn and Arwen.

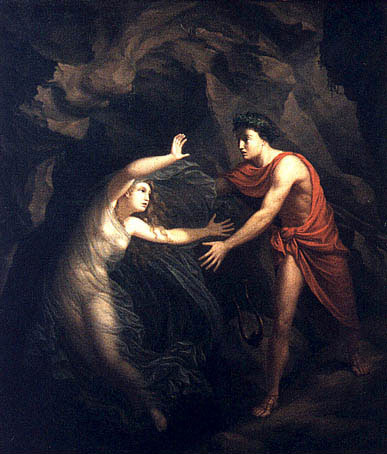
In the classical myth, Orpheus nearly rescues Eurydice from Hades, only for her to die a second death. In Tolkien's version, Lúthien plays Orpheus rather than Eurydice, three times rescuing Beren, and they enjoy a second life together.

=== Homer ===
Ursula Le Guin describes parallels between The Lord of the Rings and Homer's Iliad and Odyssey. She comments on the balance of action abroad and waiting at home, noting that while Tolkien brings Frodo home to the Shire at the end, Homer interleaves "Odysseus trying desperately to get to Penelope and Penelope desperately waiting for Odysseus – both the voyager and the goal".

Ursula Le Guin's analysis of parallels between The Lord of the Rings and Homer's Iliad and Odyssey
Element	Homer	Tolkien
"The two basic fantasy stories" "The War", "The Journey"	Iliad, Odyssey	"'There and Back Again', as Bilbo put it"
"Not the War of Good vs. Evil"; In both Dante's The Divine Comedy and Milton's Paradise Lost, "the good guys win".	The Trojan War "just a war, a wasteful, useless, needless, stupid, protracted, cruel mess..." "It isn't Satan vs. Angels. It isn't hobbits vs. orcs. It's just people vs. people."	
Balance of action abroad and waiting at home	"The reader is alternately Odysseus trying desperately to get to Penelope and Penelope desperately waiting for Odysseus – both the voyager and the goal"	"I love ... Tolkien's understanding of the importance of what goes on back on the farm while the Hero is taking his Thousand Faces all round the world", but till the return "Tolkien never takes you back home."
"Honest[y] about the difficulty of being a far-traveled hero who comes home"	"Neither Odysseus nor Frodo is able to stay there long"	

Gloria Larini compares the Trolls of The Hobbit to the one-eyed giant Polyphemus in the Odyssey. Hamish Williams argues that Tolkien's ideas on Trolls shifted from Norse myth to Polyphemus-like monster as he came to see brute strength as the opposite of the civilized use of culture and magic, in the framework of likening The Hobbit's "hospitality journey" to that of the Odyssey.

=== Other parallels ===
Tolkien related the Haradrim's mûmakil in the Battle of the Pelennor Fields to Pyrrhus of Epirus's war elephants in his 3rd century BC invasion of ancient Rome.

Charles Oughton likens Tolkien's Battle of Helm's Deep to Livy's account of Horatius Cocles's heroic defence of Rome's Pons Sublicius bridge. The heroes Aragorn, Éomer, and Gimli hold off the army of Orcs; Horatius holds off the army of Etruscans at the bridge. Oughton finds multiple matches between the two accounts. Several of these are not present in Thomas Babington Macaulay's poem "Horatius" which retells Livy's tale, though Oughton suggests that Tolkien did make additional use of Macaulay for some details.

The scholar of English literature Charles A. Huttar compares the combination of a tentacled monster, the Watcher in the Water, and the "clashing gate" when the Fellowship pass through the Doors of Durin, only to have the Watcher smash the rocks behind them, to Greek mythology's Wandering Rocks near the opening of the underworld, and to Odysseus's passage between the devouring Scylla and the whirlpool Charybdis.

Verlyn Flieger has called Fëanor "a Promethean figure ... [an] overreacher whose excess is punished, yet whose accomplishments succeed in bringing ... a spark which can elevate humankind".

Newman compares the myth of Elendil and the defeat of Sauron with Jason's taking of the Golden Fleece. In both, a golden prize is taken; in both, there are evil consequences – Elendil's son Isildur is betrayed and the Ring is lost, leading to the War of the Ring and Frodo's quest; Medea murders Jason's children.

Julian Eilmann argues that the tale of Túrin, often vaguely described as "tragic", fits the pattern of Aristotle's theory of tragedy, as described in his Poetics, and accordingly arouses "strong emotional responses of pity and shock". Aristotle's elements of peripeteia or reverse of circumstances, anagnorisis or moments of critical discovery, and pathos or emotional appeal are all present, confirming that the tale is indeed tragic. Tolkien wrote that Túrin had multiple mythological parallels, including to Oedipus. (Note: Carpenter 2023, #131 to Milton Waldman, late 1951)

John Garth likens the earthly paradise of Valinor, shielded by the mountainous wall of the Pelóri, to the Greek paradise of Hyperborea, protected "at the back of the north wind behind a huge mountain range".

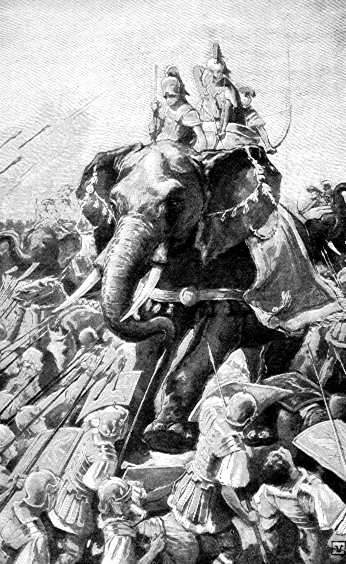
Tolkien related the Haradrim's mûmakil to Pyrrhus of Epirus's war elephants in his invasion of Rome.

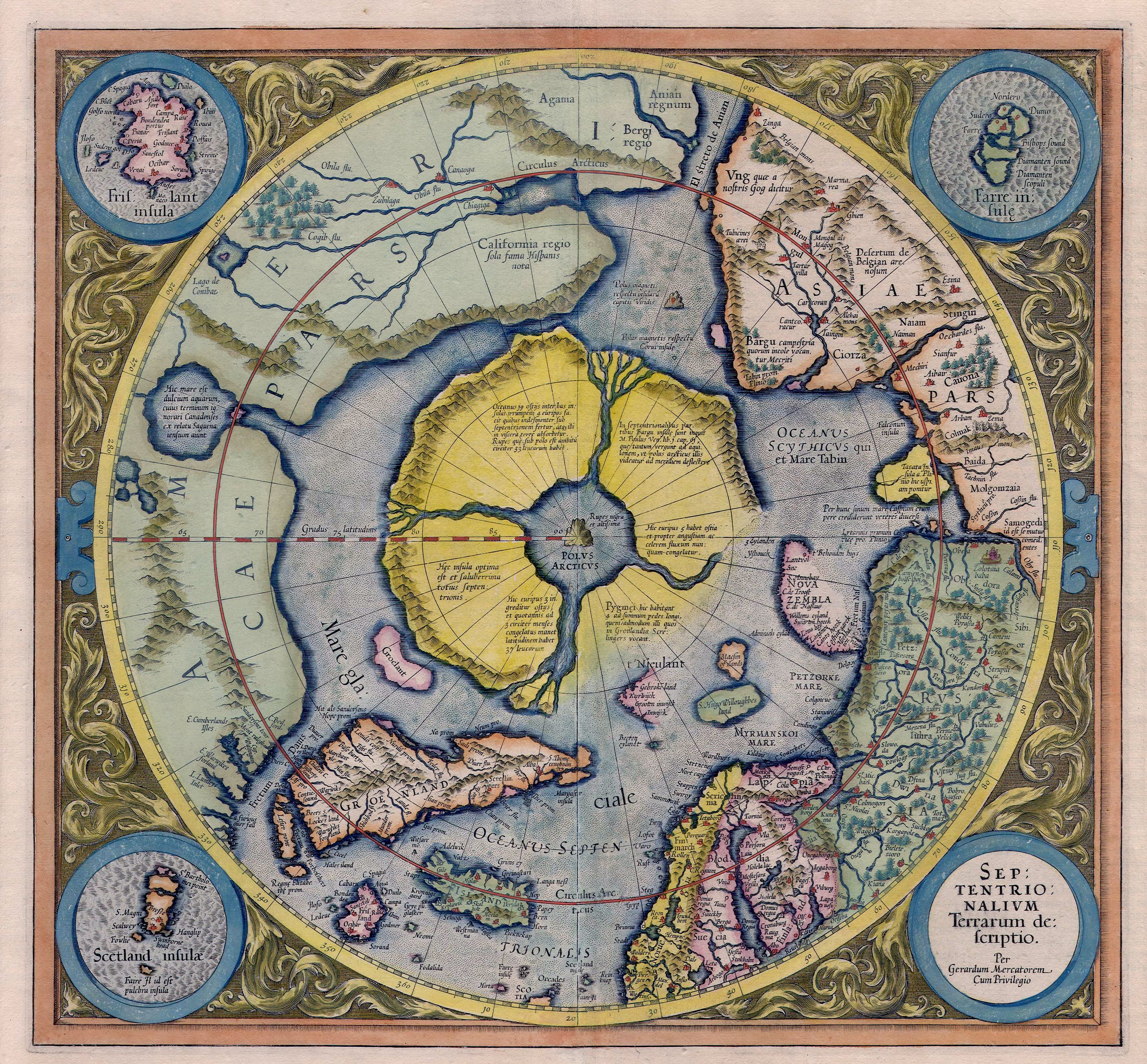
An arctic continent at the north pole, shielded by a ring of mountains, in this 1623 map, like the Greek Hyperborea or Tolkien's Valinor with its Pelóri mountain wall

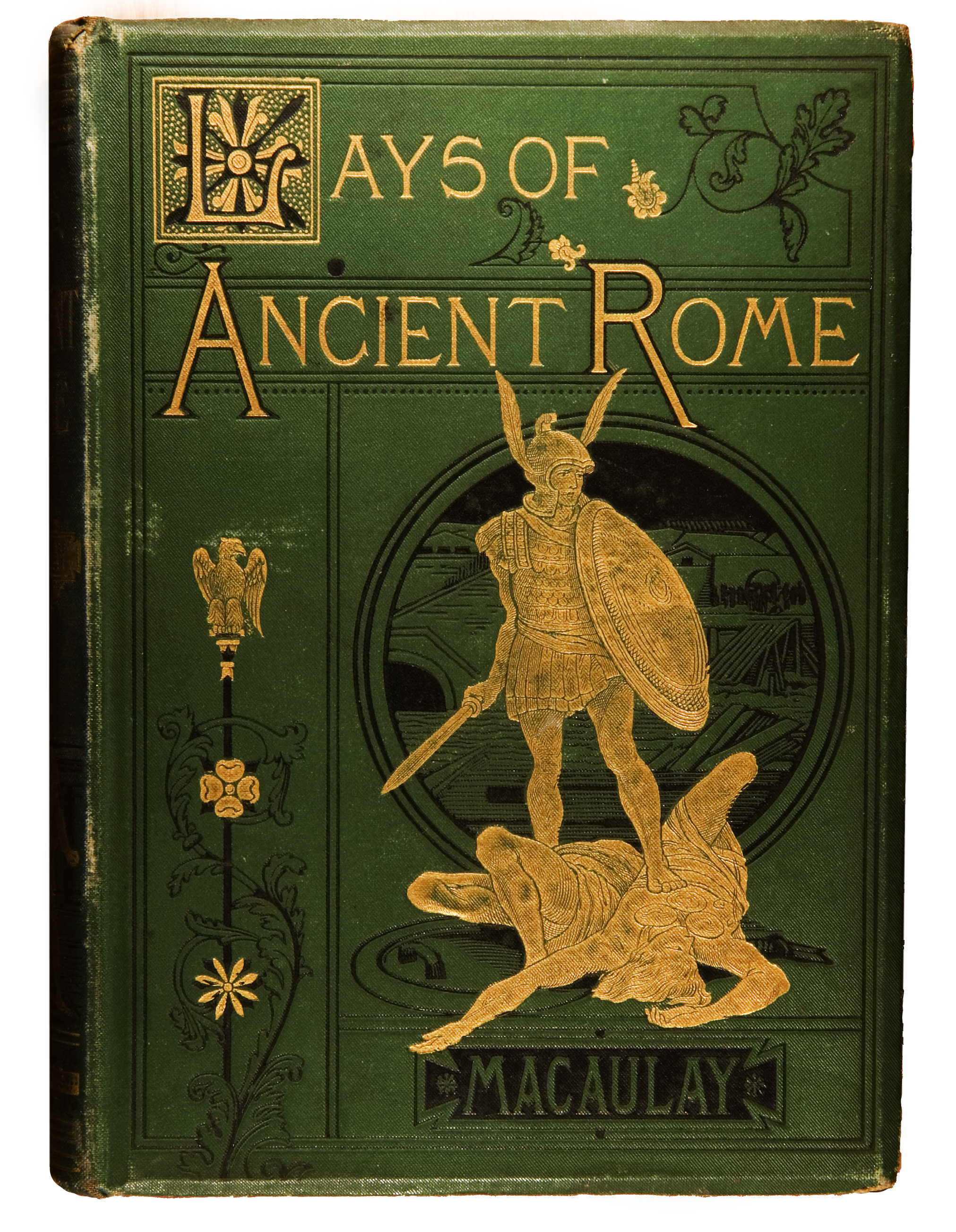
Tolkien made use of Livy's tale of the heroic bridge defence by Horatius Cocles, perhaps partly via Macaulay's version in his 1842 Lays of Ancient Rome.

== Ithilien: Mediterranean but not necessarily classical ==
Philip Burton, examining philological and botanical aspects of Tolkien's works, concludes that Tolkien appears consistently to stress "underlying oneness of the Mediterranean and northern European worlds", and that he repeatedly displays interest in "things associated with the Mediterranean but not distinctly 'classical'". A clear example is the Mediterranean vegetation of the southern province of Ithilien:

Ithilien, the garden of Gondor now desolate kept still a dishevelled dryad loveliness. Many great trees grew there, ... and groves and thickets there were of tamarisk and pungent terebinth, of olive and of bay; and there were junipers and myrtles; and thymes that grew in bushes, ... sages of many kinds putting forth blue flowers, or red, or pale green; and marjorams and new-sprouting parsleys, and many herbs of forms and scents beyond the garden-lore of Sam. The grots and rocky walls were already starred with saxifrages and stonecrops. Primeroles and anemones were awake in the filbert-brakes; and asphodel and many lily-flowers nodded their half-opened heads ... Great ilexes of huge girth stood dark and solemn in wide glades ... and there were acres populous with the leaves of woodland hyacinths: (Note: Tolkien 1954, book 4, ch. 7 "Journey to the Cross-roads")

Resemblances of Ithilien to Italy

Tolkien alludes to dryads, classical tree-nymphs, in his description of Ithilien

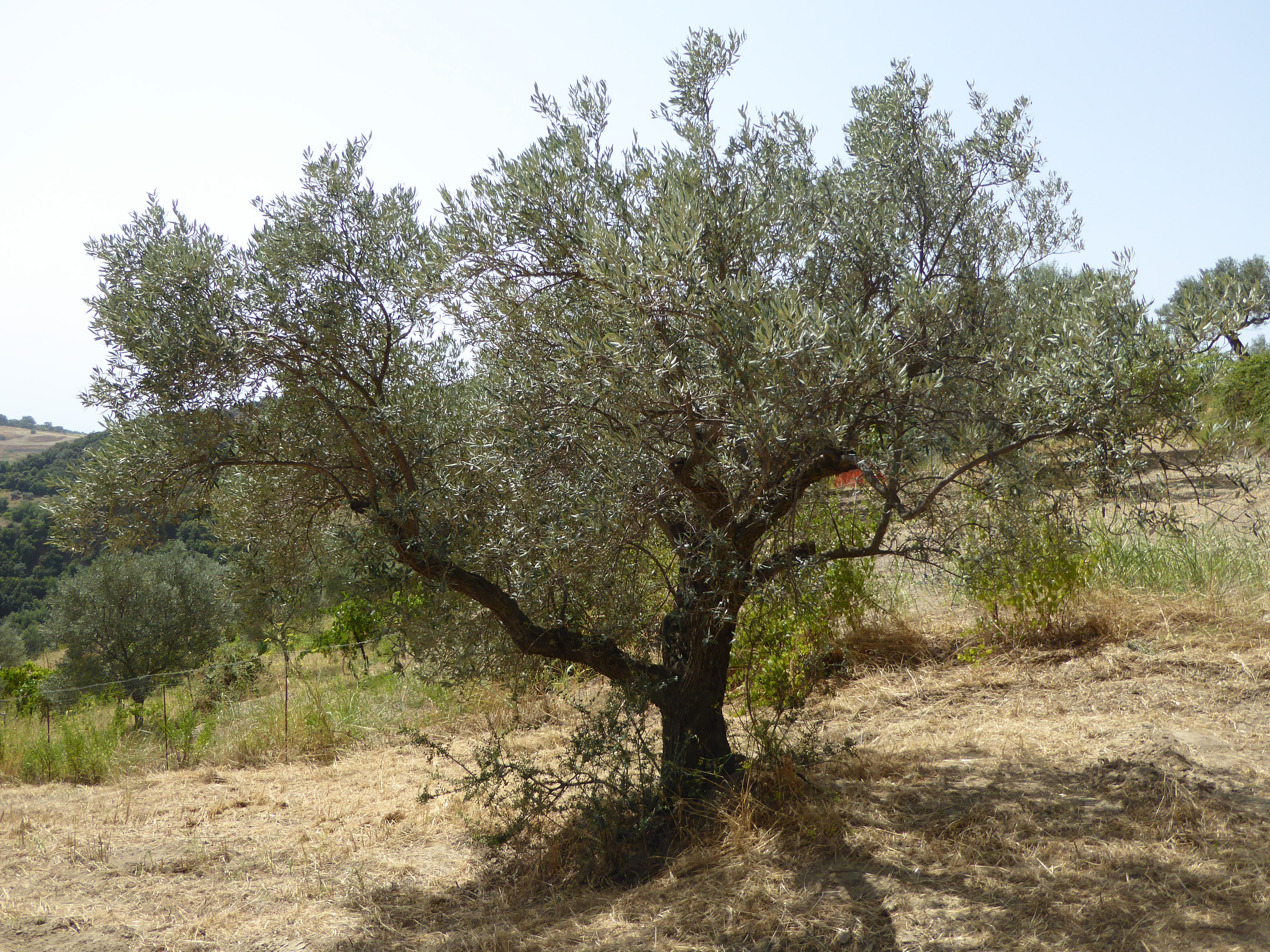
Ithilien is said to be home to the olive,
a tree of the Mediterranean basin

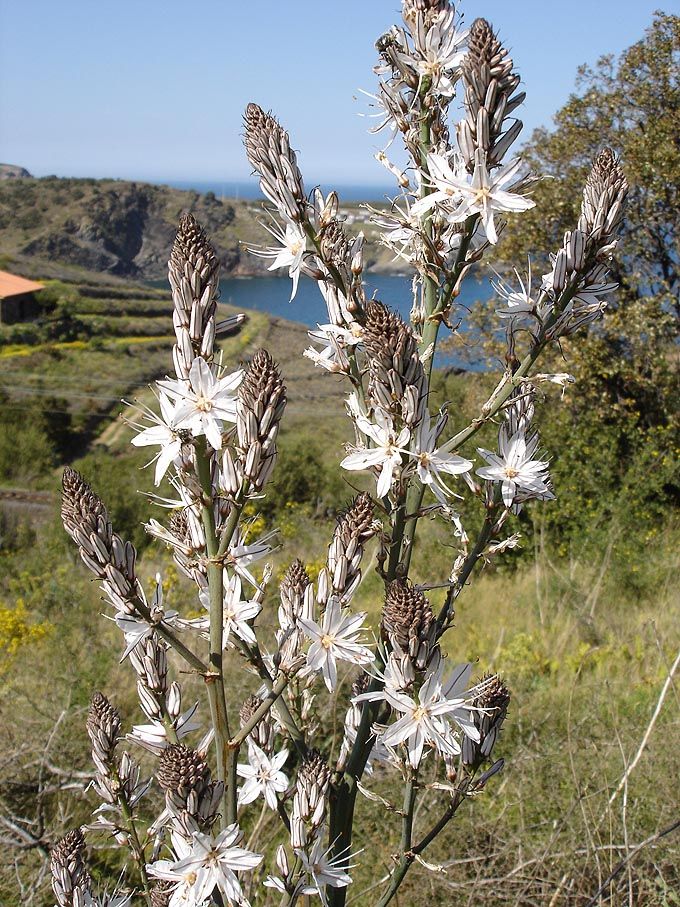
Asphodel, one of the Mediterranean herbs found in Ithilien

Burton grants that the mention of dryads (tree-nymphs) is "certainly ... strikingly classical", and cites Richard Jenkyns's identification of the described landscape as Mediterranean: "Ithilien is Italy, as the name implies". All the same, Burton comments, many of the plant names, seemingly "a parade of Greek and Latin lexis", actually "point beyond the strictly 'classical'." Thus, the -nth- element in "terebinth" and "hyacinth" has been claimed to precede Greek, coming from Asia Minor. "Lily" has an Egyptian origin, and had arrived in England by the 10th century. Many of the plants are, Burton writes, familiar enough in northern Europe that they may "lose their foreign associations altogether."

According to Philip Burton, Tolkien's Ithilien, along with plants living there, have Mediterranean and Classical connections.

In Burton's view, Tolkien, "an Indo-Europeanist by training", is unable to treat classical Greece or Rome as "the fountainhead of Western civilization", since they are part of a Eurasian culture. Further, Tolkien's Catholicism leads him to focus on Christ's incarnation, not on some secular tradition of civilization. Burton comments that since the incarnation is situated in the classical world, that world "has a peculiar claim on our interest", but Tolkien was equally attracted to echoes of the story in other "mythical traditions". Garth, one of Tolkien's biographers, comments that Tolkien was seeking to create a mythology for England which would be "redolent of our 'air' ... not Italy or the Aegean, still less the East", (Note: Carpenter 2023, #131 to Milton Waldman, late 1951) and that in doing this he managed to "borrow classical ideas without borrowing the atmosphere."

== The effect of Jackson's The Lord of the Rings on cinematic Greece and Rome ==
Orlando Bloom as the Elf-archer Legolas in Peter Jackson's 2002 The Lord of the Rings: The Two Towers. The actor appeared again as "an accomplished archer" in the 2004 film Troy, one of several classical world films influenced by Jackson.

Antony Keen, an author on the reception of the classics in film and science fiction, writes that Peter Jackson's 2001–2003 films of The Lord of the Rings have had a powerful influence on the portrayal of the classical era in film. One effect, he argues, has been a focus on heroes of Greek mythology, with a move away from Rome, seen as a historical setting, towards Greece, seen as more mythical. Another effect is the addition of monsters; a third, the imitation of Jackson's battle scenes; and a fourth, the use of Jackson's stars in films of the classical world. Keen sees the 2004 film Troy as an early instance, with Orlando Bloom, who had played the Elf-archer Legolas for Jackson, appearing again as "an accomplished archer", Paris. Further, its battles make use of "wide aerial pans of CGI armies" and "an assault upon a defended wall", like Jackson's portrayal of the Battle of Helm's Deep.

Keen comments that four films set at least partly in Roman Britain all make use of something much like Jackson-style "aerial footage, taken from helicopters, showing parties of characters striding across the landscape". These are the 2004 King Arthur; the 2007 The Last Legion; the 2010 Centurion; and the 2011 The Eagle. The films also use "a certain degree of Celtic-style non-verbal singing", which Keen supposes is imitative of Howard Shore's music for The Lord of the Rings films. He suggests in addition that such films have taken on some of Jackson's tropes, such as that the story should be somewhat mythological or fantastical.

The use of monsters, too, has become available to film directors; Keen mentions the "Immortals" in the 2006 film 300 as "echo[ing] the Orcs", while its "Uber Immortal", a departure from the comic on which the film was based, reminds him of Jackson's cave troll.

== See also ==
- Tolkien and the Celtic
- Tolkien and the Norse
- Tolkien's modern sources

== Sources ==
- Arduini, Roberto; Canzonieri, Giampaolo; Testi, Claudio A., eds. (2019). Tolkien and the Classics. Zurich: Walking Tree Publishers. ISBN 978-3-905703-42-9. OCLC 1107816986. (contains 4 essays on "Tolkien and Authors from Antiquity", also covers medieval and modern "classics")
- Carpenter, Humphrey, ed. (2023) [1981]. The Letters of J. R. R. Tolkien: Revised and Expanded Edition. New York: HarperCollins. ISBN 978-0-35-865298-4.
- Flieger, Verlyn (1983). Splintered Light: Logos and Language in Tolkien's World. Wm. B. Eerdmans. ISBN 0-8028-1955-9.
- Garth, John (2020). The Worlds of J. R. R. Tolkien: The Places that Inspired Middle-earth. London: Frances Lincoln Publishers. ISBN 978-0-71124-127-5.
- Newman, J. K. (2005). "J.R.R. Tolkien's 'The Lord of the Rings': A Classical Perspective". Illinois Classical Studies. 30: 229–247. JSTOR 23065305.
- Shippey, Tom (2005) [1982]. The Road to Middle-Earth: How J. R. R. Tolkien Created a New Mythology (Third ed.). HarperCollins. ISBN 978-0-261-10275-0.
- Tolkien, J. R. R. (1954a). The Fellowship of the Ring. The Lord of the Rings. Boston: Houghton Mifflin. OCLC 9552942.
- Tolkien, J. R. R. (1954). The Two Towers. The Lord of the Rings. Boston: Houghton Mifflin. OCLC 1042159111.
- Tolkien, J. R. R. (1977). Christopher Tolkien (ed.). The Silmarillion. Boston: Houghton Mifflin. ISBN 978-0-395-25730-2.
- Tolkien, J. R. R. (1992). Christopher Tolkien (ed.). Sauron Defeated. Boston, New York, & London: Houghton Mifflin. ISBN 0-395-60649-7.
- Williams, Hamish, ed. (2021). Tolkien and the Classical World. Zurich: Walking Tree Publishers. ISBN 978-3-905703-45-0. OCLC 1237352408.
- Williams, Hamish (2023). Tolkien's Utopianism and the Classics. London: Bloomsbury. ISBN 978-1-350-24145-9.
