= Hamish Williams =

Classical studies scholar

- Born: 1988 (age 37–38); Cape Town, South Africa

Academic background
- Education: University of Cape Town

Academic work
- Discipline: Classical studies
- Sub-discipline: Classical reception, Tolkien studies
- Notable works: Tolkien and the Classical World

Hamish G. D. Williams is a scholar of classical reception and fantasy at the University of Groningen. He is known for his 2021 book Tolkien and the Classical World about classical influences on J. R. R. Tolkien's Middle-earth writings.

== Biography ==
Hamish G. D. Williams gained his PhD at the University of Cape Town in 2017; his thesis was titled "The Typical and Connotative Character of Xeinoi Situations across the Apologue: Three Studies in Repetition". He then lectured at Leiden University, moving to the University of Jena as a research fellow in 2019. In 2021 he became a fellow at the Polish Institute for Advanced Studies. Alongside this, in 2020 he joined the faculty at the University of Groningen, where he is a scholar of classical reception and fantasy.

He is known for his 2021 edited collection Tolkien and the Classical World about classical influences on J. R. R. Tolkien's Middle-earth writings. He has written research articles on Tolkien studies, on classical reception, and on fantasy literature. His 2023 monograph J.R.R. Tolkien's Utopianism and the Classics has been welcomed as insightful and well-conceived.

== Books ==
=== Written ===
- Williams, Hamish (2021). The Southern Tide. Ranger. ISBN 978-9492469304. (fiction)
- Williams, Hamish (2023). J.R.R. Tolkien's Utopianism and the Classics. Bloomsbury Publishing. ISBN 978-1350241480.

=== Edited ===
- Williams, Hamish, ed. (2021). Tolkien and the Classical World. Zurich: Walking Tree Publishers. ISBN 978-3-905703-45-0.
- Williams, Hamish; Clare, Ross, eds. (2022). The Ancient Sea: The Utopian and Catastrophic in Classical Narratives and their Reception. Liverpool University Press. ISBN 978-1802079227.
