= Tolkien and the Classical World (book) =

2021 scholarly collection of essays

- Front cover with Greek-style artwork of Dwarves fighting Trolls
- Author: Hamish Williams
- Cover artist: Jay Johnstone
- Series: Cormarë, no. 45
- Subject: Tolkien research
- Genre: Scholarly essays
- Publisher: Walking Tree
- Publication date: 2021
- ISBN: 978-3-905703-45-0

Tolkien and the Classical World is a 2021 scholarly collection of essays on the influence from ancient Greek and Roman civilisations on J. R. R. Tolkien's Middle-earth writings, especially The Silmarillion and The Lord of the Rings. It is edited by Hamish Williams, with an afterword by Graham Shipley that comments on the book and its themes. The essays explore different aspects of classical thought, not just looking for direct sources but for parallels and possibly unconscious influences. One area where Tolkien explicitly acknowledged classical influence was in his use of Plato's Atlantis legend in his tale of Númenor, the island civilisation that is lost beneath the waves.

The book has been broadly welcomed by scholars as exploring a largely overlooked area, not least because modern readers are less familiar with the classics than were readers in Tolkien's lifetime. Its essays have been praised in Mythlore as unusual in being entirely of good quality. Victor Parker comments that the authors face the problem that the classics thoroughly influenced medieval thought, so that it is often unclear whether an object has a medieval or a classical origin. Kevin Bouillot notes that the collection assumes some familiarity with Tolkien's writings, though not of the classics.

== Synopsis ==
Hamish Williams introduces the book, comparing Tolkien with C. S. Lewis, but without summarizing the contents of the book. He discusses Tolkien's appeal, which he states "must lie in its comprehensive hermetic consistency". He writes that Tolkien simultaneously conveys a "profound otherness" and an "eerie sense of familiarity and, thus, nostalgia".

Part 1. Classical Lives and Histories

Hamish Williams's "Tolkien the Classicist" presents an alternative history of Tolkien's life to that of Humphrey Carpenter's 1977 J. R. R. Tolkien: A Biography, this time as a classical scholar. Williams analyses his education; the movement of his thought away from the classical canon; and Tolkien's return to classical thinking later in his life.

Ross Clare examines classical historiographies of decline and fall by Herodotus, Thucydides and later Roman and Christian accounts to illuminate the fictional Númenor, the island civilisation that is lost beneath the waves.

Part 2. Ancient Epic and Myth

Giuseppe Pezzini looks at how Tolkien echoes classical patterns of divine interaction, noting that Tolkien had likened the Valar to the gods of classical mythology "albeit with differences", such as that the Valar sought fellowship with the Elves, rather than the sexual gratification the gods sometimes sought with mortals.

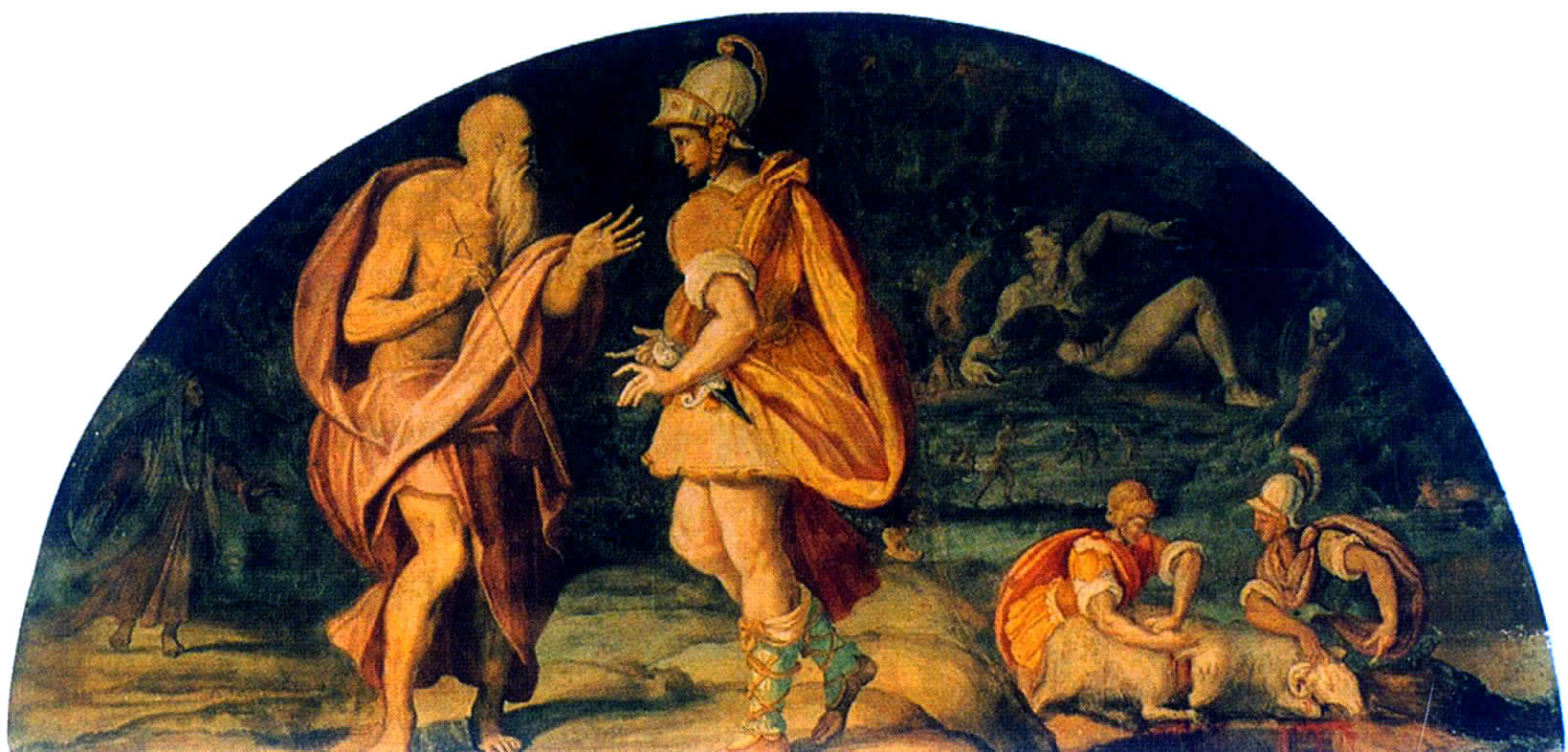
Benjamin Stevens likens episodes like Lúthien's descent into Angband to classical katabasis. Illustrated: Odysseus consults the soul of the prophet Tiresias.

Benjamin Eldon Stevens writes on katabasis, journeys to the underworld and encounters with the dead, in Middle-earth. Among the episodes he explores are the fall of the Elves, Lúthien's descent into the dark lord Morgoth's fortress of Angband, the Fellowship's journey through the dangerous tunnels of Moria, Gandalf's fight there with the Balrog, and Aragorn's taking the Paths of the Dead. He argues that unlike the ancient world, the Catholic Tolkien links death to life everlasting, katabasis to eucatastrophe.

Austin M. Freeman discusses how Tolkien used Virgil's concept of pietas, pious duty, in the context of the fall of Gondolin and the assault on Minas Tirith. He argues that Tolkien moves away from kleos (glory) to a combination of classical pietas, indomitable Northern will, and Christian pistis (faith), creating a Tolkienian virtue of estel (hope), meaning "active trust and loyalty".

Peter Astrup Sundt examines how Tolkien used the legend of Orpheus and Eurydice in his tale of Beren and Lúthien, and in the stories of Tom Bombadil and the Ents. He traces connections both to the medieval Sir Orfeo and to Virgil's Georgics and Ovid's Metamorphoses. In his view, Tolkien's use of these sources echoes not just his knowledge of the classics but his love of his wife Edith and his feeling for "music, poetry, and trees".

Part 3. In Dialogue with the Greek Philosophers

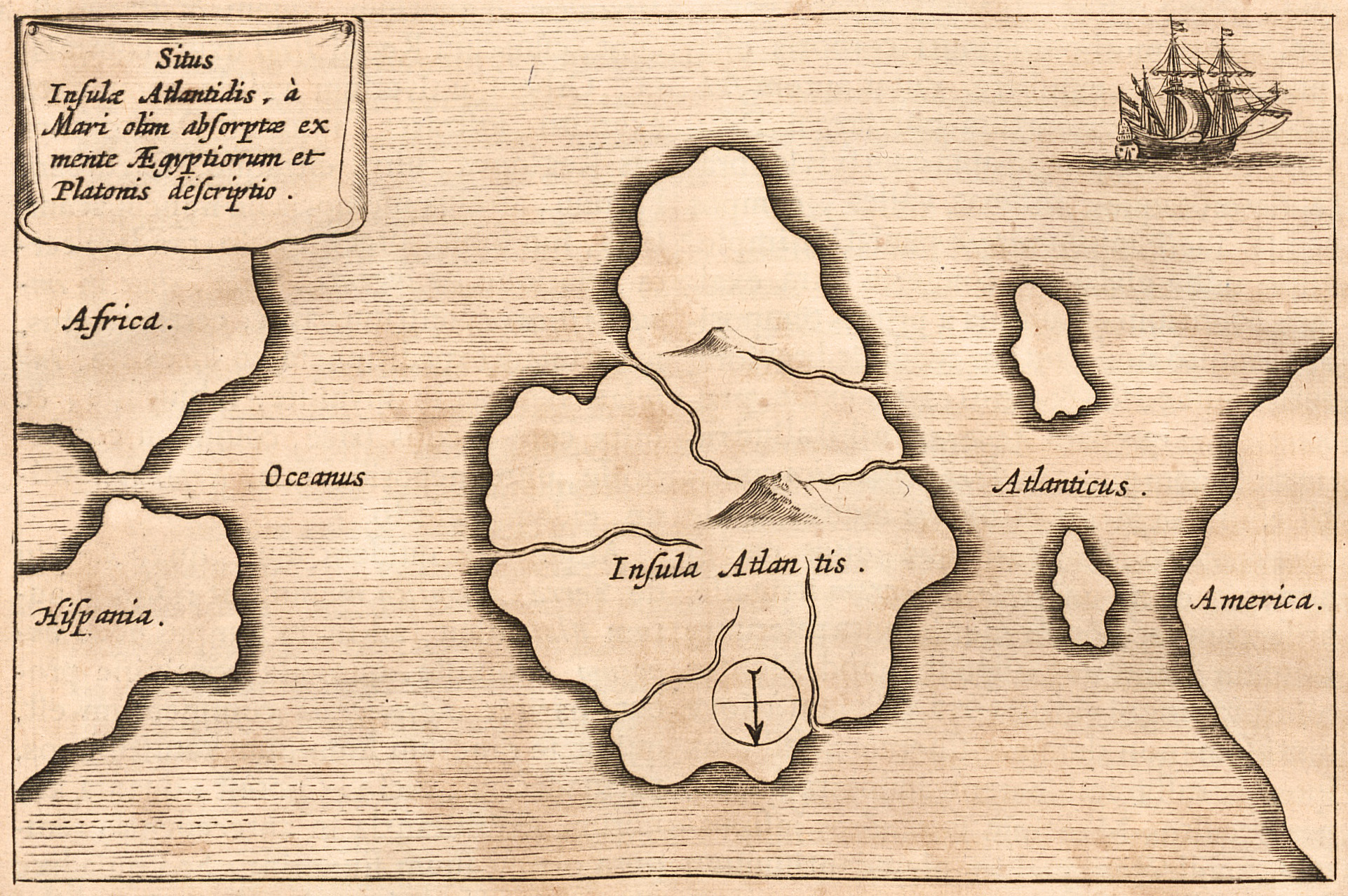
Athanasius Kircher's map of Atlantis. Tolkien acknowledged the influence of Plato's Atlantis legend.

Michael Kleu compares Plato's Atlantis and Tolkien's Númenor and discusses the role of the Middle-earth episode, which Tolkien called "a special personal concern with this tradition of the culture-bearing men of the Sea, which so profoundly affected the imagination of peoples of Europe with westward-shores." He links it, too, to Tolkien's recurring dream of the "Great Wave".

Lukasz Neubauer analyses the similarities of Plato's Ring of Gyges in his Republic and Tolkien's One Ring, including the granting of invisibility and the fuelling of corruption in the wearer's heart.

Julian Eilmann considers the applicability of Aristotle's theory of tragedy in his Poetics to The Children of Húrin. He argues that Tolkien uses multiple elements of the theory in the "tragic" story to arouse "pity and shock".

Part 4. Around the Borders of the Classical World

Philip Burton examines whether philology supports a classical origin of Middle-earth. He calls Tolkien's use of the classical world "oblique", rejecting the conventional view that it was the origin of Western civilization in favour of northern Europe. He argues that the German scholars Victor Hehn and Otto Schrader influenced Tolkien in this regard; and that Tolkien used names of plants, wine, dragons, and elephants carefully, as he knew that they "cut across traditional north-south and east-west divides".

Richard Z. Galland compares the Noldor Elves and the Edain, the Men of the West, to Romans and Germani. He argues that the Edain become accultured by the Elves, just as the Germanic peoples did when they encountered the Romans. The "Noldorization" includes military support, education of leaders, learning the Sindarin language and adopting Elvish culture. This results in their transformation from barbarians to a Roman-style regnum (kingdom), Númenor.

Juliette Harrisson likens Gondor and Rohan to the ancient Mediterranean and Germanic worlds respectively. Unlike the conflict between the remnant Roman Empire and the Germanic tribes, Tolkien has Gondor and Rohan working together.

Part 5. Shorter Remarks and Observations

Alley Marie Jordan likens the rural culture of the hobbits of the Shire to that of the shepherds in Virgil's Eclogues.

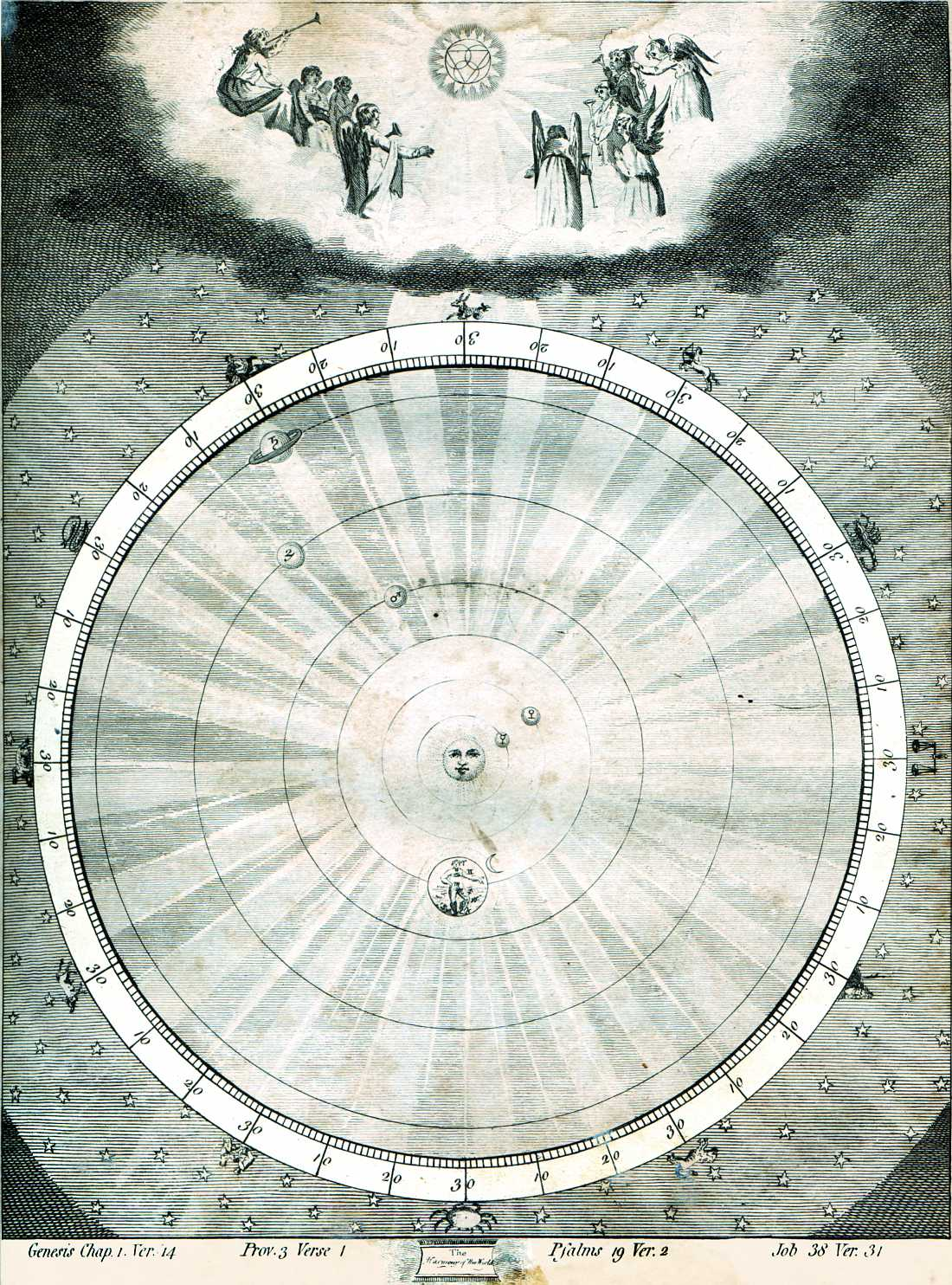
Oleksandra Filonenko and Vitalii Shchepanskyi suggest that the Ainulindalë's creative cosmic music may reflect the medieval theology of the "music of the spheres". Illustration from Ebenezer Sibly's 1806 Astrology

Oleksandra Filonenko and Vitalii Shchepanskyi explore how classical antiquity influenced the role of music in The Silmarillion. The Ainulindalë has been thought Christian, but, they argue, the medieval theology of the "music of the spheres" derives from Classical "Pythagorean and (Neo)Platonic" philosophies. Tolkien departs from the Pythagorean concept by having the Ainur sing the cosmic music, more like the mystical writings of Dionysius the Areopagite, or perhaps like Plato's Sirens, each of whom sits on one of the cosmological circles and sings a single note, together forming a harmony, while the three Fates sing more complex songs.

Afterword

D. Graham J. Shipley sets Tolkien's response to the classics in context, discussing the way he adapts and reshapes concepts and stories from the sources he uses, and mentioning the various essays in the volume as he proceeds. He often chose "models that he could refashion in order to serve the narrative archetypes upon which he builds". Those archetypes included "the wisdom of the lowly; the peripheral and the imperial; the human fear of death; the just ruler; and decline and redemption, both of individual[s] and of society." The Classical world is not argued to be the primary influence on Tolkien, but to be just as important as the medieval elements examined by other scholars.

== Publication history ==
The book was published in paperback by Walking Tree Publishers in 2021. There are no illustrations apart from the cover.

== Reception ==
Tolkien and the Classical World has been broadly welcomed by scholars. Several note Williams's remark that modern readers are less familiar with the classics than readers in Tolkien's lifetime, and may accordingly interpret his writings differently, not least in terms of the medieval-style secondary world that Tolkien brought to fantasy.

Larry J. Swain, writing in Mythlore, praises the essays in the collection as unusual in being entirely of good quality, examining a range of "classical sources and inspirations". He notes that the focus is mainly on The Lord of the Rings, with some attention to the rest of Tolkien's legendarium. He adds that the cover artwork, depicting dwarves battling trolls "in the style of Athenian black-figure pottery art where the viewer might see a battle of Greeks and Trojans" is "nothing short of fantastic", setting the stage for the scholarly essays. Reviewing each of the essays, he picks out Sundt's on the myth of Orpheus as convincing him that the myth formed the "background to much that is in Middle-earth."

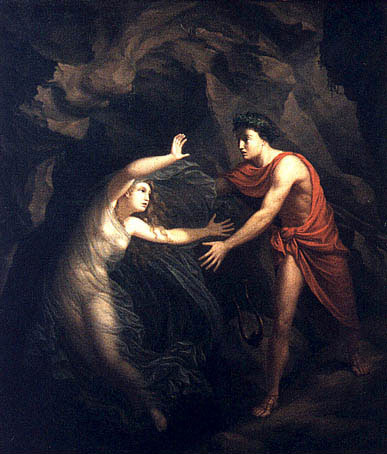
Victor Parker admires essays like Peter Sundt's on the applicability of the Orpheus myth to the tale of Beren and Lúthien. 1806 painting "Orpheus and Eurydice" by Christian Gottlieb Kratzenstein-Stub

Victor Parker, reviewing the book for Tolkien Studies, mentions two methodological obstacles, namely that the classics are mediated by "pervasive influence" on medieval thought, and that both classical and medieval periods may attest certain objects (like networks of beacons), and it may be unclear which Tolkien was using. He gives as an instance how the story of the Trojan War is told in classical works like the Iliad, and is then retold in medieval works like the Geste Historial of the Destruction of Troy. Parker agrees that each essay manages to show that its source is "at least" plausible, but feels that the study of classical sources has "some distance to go" before it reaches the level of Tom Shippey's analysis of Tolkien's medieval influences. He finds the strongest essays to be those that directly discuss their classical source, like Sundt's Orpheus or Kleu's Atlantis, rather than generalising from other research. He admires Pezzini's essay on divine intervention, and Neubauer's on the Ring of Gyges. He notes that Herodotus too told the tale of Gyges but without the magic ring, likening this to Tolkien's tale of Sméagol (who became Gollum) when he had recently acquired the One Ring.

John Houghton, in Journal of Tolkien Research, gives the book a critical but not unfriendly review, pointing out some factual errors but calling it a "colossal volume". He finds essays like Clare's on historiographies open to "nebulosity", but agrees that Clare gives "three reasonably solid examples" as Númenor rises and falls like Athens, the "good" and "bad" kings paralleling attitudes to Roman emperors, and the King's men faction resembling persecuted Christians in the Roman empire. Houghton finds Eilmann's expanded chapter effective in setting out how Aristotle's Poetics applies to the tragic tale of Túrin.

Joel D. Ruark, writing in VII, states that the essays mainly do "comparative analysis between Tolkien and the classics", enabling the reader to see the similarities and contrasts between the two. Ruark feels that the book largely succeeds in "presenting and defending the position that the Greco-Roman classics influenced Tolkien’s thought and imagination throughout his life." He finds the balance of primary and secondary sources largely satisfying, though he would have liked more detail on Tolkien's own opinions on the links between his writings and the classics. He comments that he was "not [always] fully convinced that the comparisons being drawn were deliberate on Tolkien’s part", but found the many parallels "enlightening—and even delightful".

Christian Beck, in Thersites, calls the volume "monumental" and its stated task "challenging", something that Beck notes is acknowledged by the book's editor, Williams. He finds Harrisson's essay on the classical background to Tolkien's Gondor/Rohan relationship "a compelling image" of "an alternative history". In his view, the volume is comprehensive, lacking only an article on architecture in Middle-earth. He notes Shipley's afterword which discusses Tolkien's interest in not just giving classical tales a happy ending, but that he "reinterpreted them to serve his narrative", which Shipley considers "Tolkien's greatest achievement in dealing with classical themes". Beck notes Shipley's comment that classical references are not "the most important part ... but are nevertheless unmistakably present."

Kevin Bouillot, writing in the French journal Anabases, states that despite Tolkien's millions of readers and the size of the scholarly literature about him, the role of classics and antiquity remains little studied despite dedicated issues on the topic in Tolkien Studies (2004), Journal of Inklings Studies (2011) and Journal of Tolkien Research (2014). He notes that Tolkien largely refused to make intertextual comments on his own work, obliging the contributors to identify themes and concepts that Tolkien had presumably borrowed. He finds the result reasonably coherent, despite the inevitable overlaps, setting out "the salient elements" of Middle-earth's classical roots. Bouillot states that the collection assumes some familiarity with Tolkien's writings, though not of the classics. In his view the book is clear and well-informed on Tolkien's work, even if it is far from exhausting its subject matter.

Elliott Collins, in Rosetta, calls the book a valuable resource, "push[ing] the boundaries on some themes". He notes that some of the essays explore topics that Tolkien never discussed, on the basis that he could have been influenced by classical works even if he had not studied them.

James Hamby, in SFRA Review, writes that the collection demonstrates the power of the "undervalued" and "oft-neglected classical influences on Tolkien's writing", and that Williams's introductory essay does a valuable job of showing how Tolkien's education grounded him in the classics and "shaped his literary sensibilities." Hamby admires, too, the other introductory essay by Ross Clare, showing how the Delian League, like Tolkien's Númenor, grew into an autocracy. In Hamby's view, these essays indicate the deep classical roots of Middle-earth.

== Sources ==
- Carpenter, Humphrey, ed. (2023) [1981]. The Letters of J. R. R. Tolkien: Revised and Expanded Edition. New York: HarperCollins. ISBN 978-0-35-865298-4.
- Williams, Hamish, ed. (2021). Tolkien and the Classical World. Zurich: Walking Tree Publishers. ISBN 978-3-905703-45-0. OCLC 1237352408.
