= Christian light in Tolkien's legendarium =

Literary analysis

J. R. R. Tolkien, a devout Roman Catholic, embodied Christianity in his legendarium, including The Lord of the Rings. Light is a prominent motif in Christianity: it is the first thing created by God in the Book of Genesis, it symbolizes God's grace and blessings elsewhere in the Old Testament, and it is closely associated with both Jesus and humanity itself in the Gospel of John in the New Testament.

In The Silmarillion, light is similarly important. It appears early on in the Years of the Lamps, with two enormous lamps atop mountain-sized pillars to light the world of Arda. When these are destroyed by the Dark Lord Melkor, they are replaced by the Two Trees of Valinor, which provide light for the new home of the Valar. When these too are destroyed, the Valar use their last fruit and their last flower to create the Sun and the Moon. A little of the light of the Two Trees is captured in the Silmarils, the crafted jewels that give the book its name. These are coveted by the Dark Lord, provoking war and the destruction of much of the world of Elves, Men, and Dwarves. A survivor, Eärendil, sails across the Great Sea to ask the Valar to intervene; they expel the Dark Lord, and Eärendil and his ship Vingilot sail the heavens as the Morning Star.

In The Lord of the Rings, the Elf-land of Lothlórien is portrayed as a land of light, its city lit by many lamps, in opposition to the darkening of the world outside by the Dark Lord Sauron. Galadriel, the Lady of Lóthlorien, prepares a crystal vial of water that shines with the light of Eärendil's star, to assist Frodo on his quest "when all other lights go out". This light, a small fragment of the created light passed on via the Two Trees of Valinor, proves vital to the quest.

The Tolkien scholar Verlyn Flieger writes that Tolkien equated light with God's ability to create, and his gift of that, enabling created beings to be creative in their turn. Further, she sees The Silmarillion as a progressive splintering of the created light as evil intervenes. In each stage, in her view, the fragmentation increases and the power decreases. Thus the theme of light as Divine power, fragmented and refracted through the works of created beings, is central to the whole of Tolkien's mythology. Paul H. Kocher writes that the Galadriel perceives Sauron with Lothlórien's light, "but cannot be pierced by it in return". Susan Robbins writes that light was associated in Tolkien's mind with the Christian themes of "holiness, goodness, knowledge, wisdom, grace, hope, and God's revelation". Robert Steed argues that in several places in The Silmarillion and in The Lord of the Rings, Tolkien adapts the medieval tale of the Harrowing of Hell, in which Christ descends to Hell before his resurrection, setting the Devil's captives free with the irresistible power of his divine light.

== Context ==
J. R. R. Tolkien was a devout Roman Catholic. He described his fantasy novel The Lord of the Rings as rich in Christian symbolism. (Note: Carpenter 2023, Letters #142 to Robert Murray, S.J., 2 December 1953)

Light is the first thing to be created in the Genesis creation narrative: God creates it by his words "Let there be light", and it is specifically called "good" (Book of Genesis 1:1-4). The sun and moon are set in the vault of heaven, but are also subservient to God. Later books of the Old Testament sometimes portray light as the saving action of God and an expression of goodness and grace, such as Psalm 89 and 112. Light is also used as a symbol of goodness, uprightness, and God's blessings. In the New Testament, the motif of light is most thoroughly explored in the Gospel of John. According to John, "God is light" (1 John 1:5); Jesus is "the light of the world" (John 8:12, 9:5); and everyone has this true light within them (John 1:9). John Behr writes that John's passage on the light of humanity and its ability to overcome is "a summary of the whole Gospel": "In [God] was life; and the life was the light of men. And the light shineth in darkness; and the darkness comprehended it not." (John 1:4-5)

The medieval Harrowing of Hell story is linked with Divine light in the alliterative medieval story-poem Piers Plowman:

And the light that leapt out of Thee, Lucifer it blente, [blinded]
And blew all Thy blessed into the bliss of Paradise!

== The Silmarillion ==
The Spring of Arda, lit by the two great lamps.

The Silmarillion describes how light is divinely created and then successively fragmented through the actions of created beings.

=== Years of the Lamps ===
When they came to Arda, the Valar lit the world with two great lamps, Illuin the sky-blue and Ormal the high-gold, each set atop a pillar-like mountain. They lived at the centre of Arda, lit by the light of both lamps. This period, the Spring of Arda, was interrupted when the Dark Lord Melkor returned and destroyed the two Lamps. Arda was darkened, and reshaped with new lands and seas. (Note: Tolkien 1977, ch. 1 "Of the Beginning of Days")

=== Two Trees of Valinor ===
The Two Trees of Valinor lit Valinor; the rest of Arda was dark.

The Valar moved to the new continent of Aman and built the Kingdom of Valinor. Yavanna made the Two Trees, named Telperion (giving silver light) and Laurelin (golden light). The Trees illuminated Valinor, leaving Middle-earth in darkness. Later, Varda kindled stars above Middle-earth, and the Elves awakened there. (Note: Tolkien 1977, ch. 3 "Of the Coming of the Elves and the Captivity of Melkor") Melkor, assisted by the giant spider Ungoliant, destroyed the Two Trees. The world was again dark. (Note: Tolkien 1977, ch. 8 "Of the Darkening of Valinor") The Valar took the last living fruit of Laurelin and the last living flower of Telperion and used them to create the Moon and Sun. (Note: Tolkien 1977, ch. 11 "Of the Sun and Moon and the Hiding of Valinor")

=== Silmarils and Eärendil's Star ===
The Silmarils that give The Silmarillion its name were three gems crafted by the skilful Elf Fëanor, capturing a little of the light of the Two Trees. They were uniquely beautiful, and were stolen by Melkor, provoking war. (Note: Tolkien 1977, ch. 7 "Of the Silmarils and the Unrest of the Noldor") In the prolonged fighting, the Kingdoms of Elves, Men, and Dwarves were defeated and destroyed one by one. (Note: Tolkien 1977 ch. 18 "Of the Ruin of Beleriand and the Fall of Fingolfin"; ch. 20 "Of the Fifth Battle: Nirnaeth Arnoediad"; ch. 22 "Of the Ruin of Doriath"; ch. 23 "Of Tuor and the Fall of Gondolin") Among the remnant of these peoples, the half-Elven Eärendil possessed the last Silmaril, which had been taken from Melkor, known as Morgoth. More fighting ensued. (Note: Tolkien 1977 ch. 22 "Of the Ruin of Doriath") (Note: Tolkien 1977, ch. 24 Of the Voyage of Earendil and the War of Wrath) Eärendil sailed across the Great Sea to beg the Valar for aid against Morgoth. They sent a great army; Morgoth was defeated and expelled into the Void; Arda was again reshaped. Eärendil and his ship Vingilot were placed in the heavens, with the Silmaril glimmering in the sky as the Morning Star.

== The Lord of the Rings ==
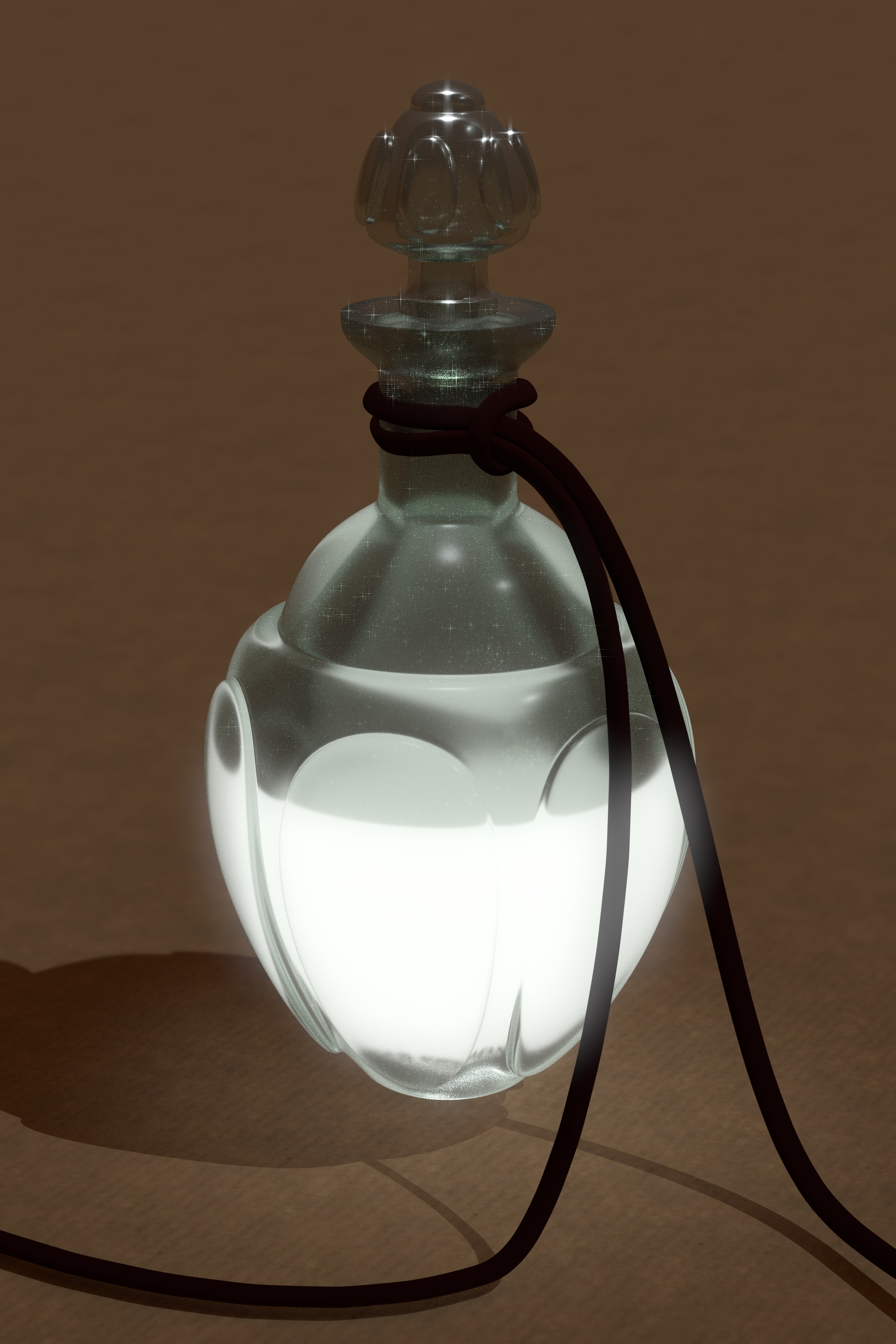
The Phial of Galadriel shines with a little of the light captured from Eärendil's star, which in turn contained a fraction of the light from the Two Trees of Valinor.

=== "Islands of light" ===
On their quest to destroy the One Ring, the members of the Fellowship stay awhile in the Elvish realm of Lothlórien. An Elf explains to the Fellowship that the lady of Lothlórien, Galadriel, has the power of light, which dwells in the land. She constantly strives with the Dark Lord Sauron, the power of darkness, who has darkened all the world outside Lothlórien, but is unable to see into her realm. Lothlórien's city, Caras Galadhon, is lit at night by "many lamps" – "green and gold and silver". (Note: Tolkien 1954a, Book 2, ch. 6 "Lothlórien") The Tolkien scholar Verlyn Flieger writes that

Those stars, the most brilliant of which is Eärendil with the Silmaril on his brow, are all that is left of the light of the Trees. Sauron, the Dark Lord, rules with increasing scope and power, and with the departure of the last Elves of the Light, his darkness is spreading over the world. Some islands of light remain—Rivendell, Lórien, perhaps even the Shire—but they are surrounded by gathering darkness.

=== Phial of Galadriel ===
The Phial of Galadriel is a small crystal bottle filled with water from Galadriel's fountain. It contains a little of the light of Eärendil's star, as it shone over Lothlórien. (Note: Tolkien 1954a, Book 2, ch. 8 "Farewell to Lorien") Galadriel offers the Phial to Frodo when the Fellowship of the Ring leaves Lothlórien, wishing him: "May it be a light to you in dark places, when all other lights go out." Frodo then wears it around his neck. Frodo and Sam use the Phial of Galadriel several times during their journey to Mordor. On the steps of Cirith Ungol, when Frodo is chased by a Nazgûl, and is about to give in to the temptation to put on the One Ring and be seen, he holds the Phial instead, which restores his senses. (Note: Tolkien 1954, Book 4, ch. 8 "The Stairs of Cirith Ungol") Later, the light it emits helps the hobbits fight Shelob in her lair. (Note: Tolkien 1954, Book 4, ch. 9 "Shelob's Lair") Sam uses the Phial to defeat the Watchers of the tower of Cirith Ungol. (Note: Tolkien 1954, Book 6, ch. 1 "The Tower of Cirith Ungol") However, its power is no match for Sauron's; when the hobbits try to use it again as they approach Mount Doom, its light fades. (Note: Tolkien 1955, Book 6, ch. 3 "Mount Doom")

== Analysis ==
=== Splintered light ===
Coat of arms of Gondor bearing the white tree, Nimloth the fair, descendant of Telperion, one of the Two Trees of Valinor that once lit the world

The theme of light runs throughout The Lord of the Rings, but is especially clear in The Silmarillion. Flieger writes that Tolkien equates light with God's ability to create, and his gift of that ability, enabling people to create in their turn. She cites from Tolkien's poem Mythopoeia ("Creation of Myth"):

man, sub-creator, the refracted light
through whom is splintered from a single White
to many hues, and endlessly combined
in living shapes that move from mind to mind.
Though all the crannies of the world we filled
with elves and goblins, though we dared to build
gods and their houses out of dark and light,
and sow the seed of dragons, 'twas our right
(used or misused). The right has not decayed.
We make still by the law in which we're made.

Flieger writes that by this, Tolkien meant that an author's ability to create fantasy fiction, or in his terms "subcreation", was derived from and could be seen as a small splinter of the Divine Light, the "single White" of the poem. Further, the whole of The Silmarillion can be seen as a working-out of this theme of Man splintering the original white light of creation "to many hues, and endlessly combined in living shapes" in the forms of the sundering of the Elves into light and dark elves, men good and bad, and dragons and other monsters. This creative light, she states, was for Tolkien closely associated with the Christian Logos, the Divine Word.

Splintering of the Created Light, with repeated re-creations
Age	Blue/Silver light	Golden light	Silmarils	Light from the Silmarils
Years of the Lamps	Illuin, sky-blue lamp of Middle-earth, atop tall pillar, Helcar	Ormal, high-gold lamp of Middle-earth, atop tall pillar, Ringil		
ending when Melkor destroys both Lamps
Years of the Trees	Telperion, silver tree, lighting Valinor	Laurelin, golden tree, lighting Valinor	Fëanor crafts 3 Silmarils with light of the Two Trees.	
ending when Melkor strikes the Two Trees, and Ungoliant kills them
Years of the Sun	Last flower becomes the Moon, carried in male spirit Tilion's ship.	Last fruit becomes the Sun, carried in female spirit Arien's ship.		
Years of the Sun			There is war over the Silmarils.	
Years of the Sun			One Silmaril is buried in the Earth, one is lost in the Sea, one sails in the Sky as Eärendil's Star.	
Third Age				Galadriel collects light of Eärendil's Star reflected in her fountain mirror.
Third Age				A little of that light is captured in the Phial of Galadriel.
Third Age				Hobbits Frodo Baggins and Sam Gamgee use the Phial to defeat the giant spider Shelob.

The light begins in The Silmarillion as a unity, and in accordance with the splintering of creation is divided into more and more fragments as the myth progresses. Middle-earth is peopled by the angelic Valar and lit by two great lamps; when these are destroyed by the fallen Vala Melkor, the world is fragmented, and the Valar retreat to Valinor, which is lit by The Two Trees. When these too are destroyed, their last fragment of light is made into the Silmarils, and a sapling too is rescued, leading to the White Tree of Numenor, the living symbol of the Kingdom of Gondor. Wars are fought over the Silmarils, and they are lost to the Earth, the Sea, and the Sky, the last of these, carried by Eärendil the Mariner, becoming the Morning Star. Some of the star's light is captured in Galadriel's Mirror, the magic fountain that allows her to see past, present, and future; and some of that light is, finally, trapped in the Phial of Galadriel, her parting gift to Frodo, the counterbalance to Sauron's evil and powerful Ring that he also carries. At each stage, the fragmentation increases and the power decreases. Thus the theme of light as Divine power, fragmented and refracted through the works of created beings, is central to the whole mythology.

Patrick Curry writes that the Two Trees of Valinor "embodied the first light of the universe", noting that they gave birth to the Sun and the Moon, and that their light survives, too, in Venus, the star of Eärendil. The theologian Ralph C. Wood comments that Melkor was "jealous that Ilúvatar alone possesses the Flame Imperishable, the Light of creative action", citing Tolkien's words that "the desire of Light" led him to "[descend] through fire and wrath into a great burning, down into Darkness". (Note: Tolkien 1977, "Valaquenta": "Of the Enemies")

The scholar of humanities Susan Robbins writes that light is "an essential symbol" in Tolkien's creation myth, describing the account of the Two Trees as "thoroughly consonant with the first two verses of Genesis 1". Both his and the biblical story of creation, she writes, start in darkness and chaos, and both involve at the outset a "holy light, coming directly from God", the Valar being "the Holy Ones". She adds that the light of the Sun and the Moon are not that pure light, as they were contaminated by evil, in the shape of the poison of the demonic spider Ungoliant. Hence, in agreement with the Bible, she writes, the Sun and the Moon are not gods as in pagan religions, but parts of a fallen world.

=== Elvish and Biblical light ===
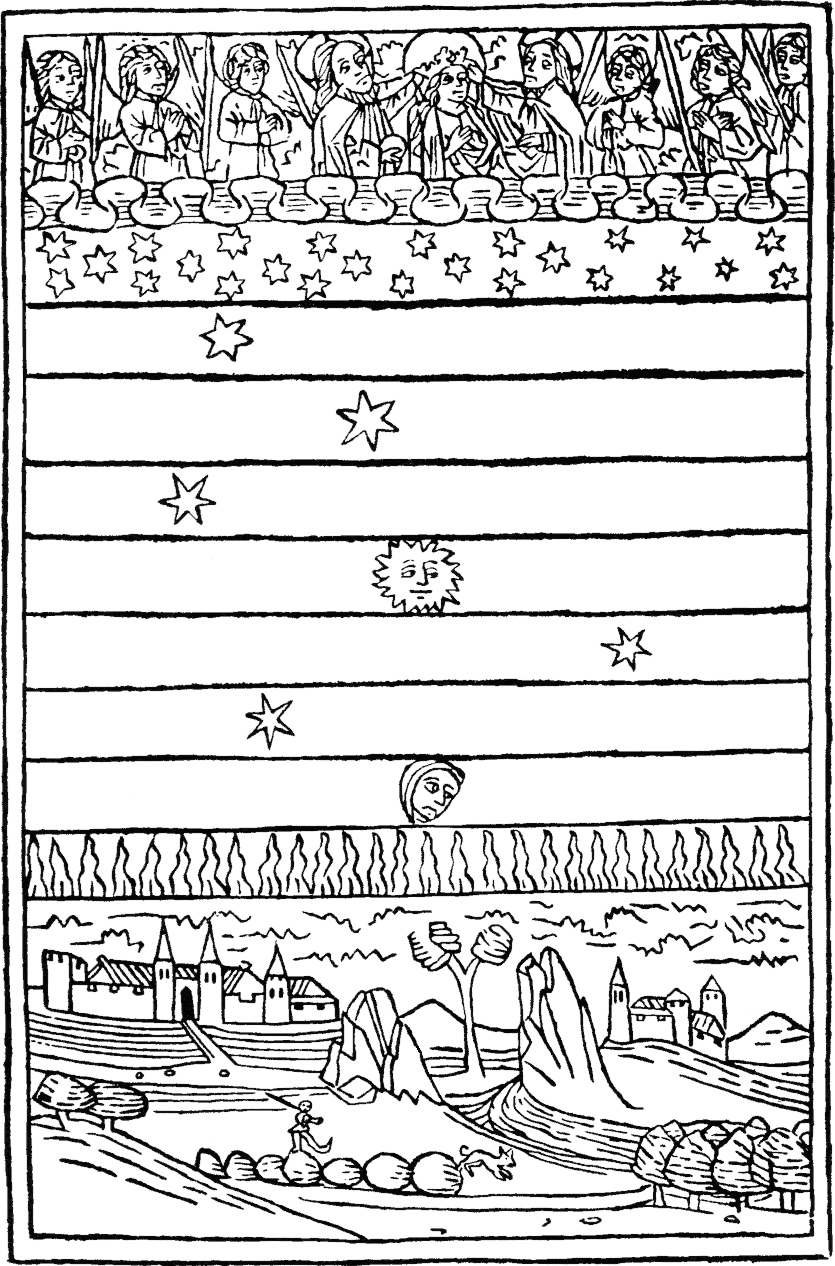
The earth, firmament, moon, sun, planets and stars. Woodcut, 1475

The Tolkien scholar Paul H. Kocher writes that Galadriel perceives the Dark Lord Sauron with Lothlórien's light, "but cannot be pierced by it in return". The good intelligence has the "imaginative sympathy" to penetrate the evil intelligence, but not vice versa. The Christian author Elizabeth Danna writes that the Elf Haldir's explanation of this [from a flet or tree-platform high above Cerin Amroth], "In this high place you may see the two powers that are opposed to one another, and ever they strive now in thought; but whereas the light perceives the very heart of the darkness, its own secret has not yet been discovered" echoes a biblical description: "The light shineth in darkness; and the darkness comprehended it not" (John 1:5).

Robbins writes that Tolkien, a devout Roman Catholic, associated light as the Bible does with "holiness, goodness, knowledge, wisdom, grace, hope, and God's revelation", and that Galadriel was one of the bearers of that light. She states at once that "By contrast, darkness has been associated with evil, sin, and despair".

The Episcopal priest and Tolkien scholar Fleming Rutledge writes that in Sam's attack on Shelob, the light of the Phial of Galadriel "leapt as if 'from the firmament with intolerable light.'" She comments that Tolkien's choice of the word "firmament", with its Biblical ring, indicates the "divine presence", while the "intolerable light" recalls the overpowering light that blinded the Apostle Paul in the New Testament, and which lit up the face of the prophet Moses in the Old Testament.

=== Harrowing of Hell ===
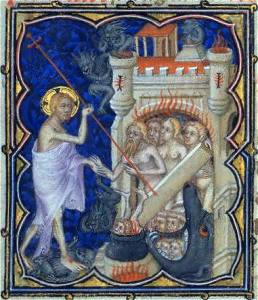
The Harrowing of Hell, Petites Heures, 14th-century illuminated manuscript for John, Duke of Berry

Robert Steed, in Mallorn, argues that Tolkien, in multiple places in The Silmarillion and The Lord of the Rings, echoes and "creatively adapts" the medieval theme of the Harrowing of Hell. The medieval tale holds that Christ spent the time between his crucifixion and resurrection down in Hell, setting the Devil's captives free with the irresistible power of his divine light. The motif, Steed suggests, involves multiple elements: 1) someone imprisoned in darkness 2) a powerful and evil jailor 3) a still more powerful liberator 4) who brings light, and 5) sets the captives free. Steed describes the tale "Of Beren and Lúthien" as an instance, where Lúthien sets Beren free from Sauron's imprisonment. Beren is freed from darkness, Lúthien from despair, so, Steed remarks, both of them take on aspects of Christ:

But Beren coming back to light out of the pit of despair lifted her up, and they looked again upon one another; and the day rising over dark hills shone upon them." (Note: Tolkien 1977, 19 "Of Beren and Lúthien")

Steed suggests that Tom Bombadil's rescuing of the Hobbits from the dark spells of the undead Barrow-wight in The Lord of the Rings (Note: Tolkien 1954a, book 1, ch. 8 "Fog on the Barrow-downs") is another "less immediately obvious" instance of the Harrowing of Hell motif. As Bombadil breaks the spell, he sings "Get out, you old Wight! Vanish in the sunlight!", making him the light-bringing Christ-figure in this case.

Steed offers two further examples of the medieval motif, commenting that they are rather more thoroughly camouflaged. The first is the Wizard Gandalf's freeing of King Théoden of Rohan from the dark insinuations of the traitorous Wormtongue, who has become a servant of the evil Wizard Saruman. In Steed's words "After rebuking Wormtongue, Gandalf raises his staff, at which point thunder rolls and the hall falls into darkness, except for the shining figure of Gandalf himself." (Note: Tolkien 1954, book 3, ch. 6 "The King of the Golden Hall") Steed observes that Théoden was not actually dead, nor actually imprisoned; he was still King, but shut away in the darkness of despair, "reinforced by Wormtongue's crafty counsel".

The final instance is Sam's complex liberation of Frodo, involving the devious imprisonment brought about by the monster Gollum, who, pretending to be helpful, leads them to Shelob's dark lair. Shelob stings Frodo, and ties him with her spider-silk. Sam fights off Shelob, and cuts down Frodo's body, thinking him dead, only for a party of Orcs to carry Frodo's body off to the tower of Cirith Ungol, joking darkly amongst themselves that he is still alive. Sam breaks into the tower and rescues Frodo. (Note: Tolkien 1955, book 6, ch. 1 "The Tower of Cirith Ungol") Steed comments that he uses light, in the form of the Phial of Galadriel, in the liberation, both when fighting Shelob and when breaking through the guard of the silent Watchers of the tower's gate. Frodo had not actually been dead, but he looked it, and death was undoubtedly close. Steed comments that Sam was an "odd" fit for the pattern of the Christ-like irresistible force, but in the narrative he indeed plays the part of the "light-bearing liberator at the center of the Harrowing of Hell motif".

== Sources ==
- Carpenter, Humphrey, ed. (2023) [1981]. The Letters of J. R. R. Tolkien: Revised and Expanded Edition. New York: HarperCollins. ISBN 978-0-35-865298-4.
- Curry, Patrick (1998) [1997]. Defending Middle-Earth: Tolkien: Myth and Modernity. HarperCollins. ISBN 978-0-261-10371-9.
- Flieger, Verlyn (1983). Splintered Light: Logos and Language in Tolkien's World. Wm B. Eerdmans Publishing. ISBN 978-0-802-81955-0.
- Kocher, Paul (1974) [1972]. Master of Middle-earth: The Achievement of J.R.R. Tolkien. Penguin Books. ISBN 0-140038779.
- Rutledge, Fleming (2004). The Battle for Middle-earth: Tolkien's Divine Design in The Lord of the Rings. Wm. B. Eerdmans. ISBN 978-0-8028-2497-4.
- Tolkien, J. R. R. (1954a). The Fellowship of the Ring. The Lord of the Rings. Boston: Houghton Mifflin. OCLC 9552942.
- Tolkien, J. R. R. (1954). The Two Towers. The Lord of the Rings. Boston: Houghton Mifflin. OCLC 1042159111.
- Tolkien, J. R. R. (1955). The Return of the King. The Lord of the Rings. Boston: Houghton Mifflin. OCLC 519647821.
- Tolkien, J. R. R. (1977). Christopher Tolkien (ed.). The Silmarillion. Boston: Houghton Mifflin. ISBN 978-0-395-25730-2.
- Tolkien, J. R. R. (2001). Tree and Leaf. HarperCollins. ISBN 978-0-007-10504-5.
- Wood, Ralph C. (2003). The Gospel According to Tolkien. Westminster John Knox Press. p. . ISBN 978-0-664-23466-9.
