= Phial of Galadriel =

Artefact in Tolkien's novel

The Phial of Galadriel is an object in J. R. R. Tolkien's epic fantasy The Lord of the Rings. It is a gift from the Elf-lady Galadriel to the protagonist Frodo Baggins, who uses its brilliant light at several critical moments during his journey to Mount Doom.

Tolkien added the Phial late in the writing of The Lord of the Rings; it appears only in his fifth version of the chapter "Farewell to Lothlórien".

The Tolkien scholar Verlyn Flieger describes the Phial as a splinter of the created light. This came ultimately from the Two Trees of Valinor, by way of a Silmaril made from their light, and then via Galadriel's fountain which captured a little of that Silmaril's light, shining as Eärendil's star. The Phial is one of the elements that associate the character of Galadriel with light, water, and Mary, mother of Jesus, indicating Galadriel's psychological pairing with the evil spider Shelob, symbolising light against darkness.

== Narrative ==
The Phial of Galadriel is a small crystal bottle filled with water from Galadriel's fountain. It contains a little of the light of Eärendil's star. (Note: Tolkien 1954a, Book 2, ch. 8 "Farewell to Lorien") The mariner Eärendil is the holder of one of the three Silmarils preserving the light of the Two Trees of Valinor, and he travels the skies like a star aboard his ship, the Vingilot. (Note: Tolkien 1977, ch. 24 "Of the Voyage of Eärendil and the War of Wrath") When the Fellowship of the Ring leaves Lothlórien, Galadriel gives each of the nine an appropriate gift. To Frodo she offers the Phial, wishing him: "May it be a light to you in dark places, when all other lights go out." Frodo then wears it around his neck.

The hobbits Frodo and Sam use the Phial several times during their journey to Mordor. Sam calls it a "star-glass". On the steps of Cirith Ungol, when Frodo is chased by a Nazgûl, and is about to give in to the temptation to put on the One Ring and reveal himself to the enemy, he holds the Phial instead, which restores his senses. (Note: Tolkien 1954, Book 4, ch. 8 "The Stairs of Cirith Ungol") Later, its light helps the hobbits fight Shelob in her lair. (Note: Tolkien 1954, Book 4, ch. 9 "Shelob's Lair")

"... slowly he held aloft the Phial of Galadriel. ... then as its power waxed, and hope grew in Frodo’s mind, it began to burn, and kindled to a silver flame, a minute heart of dazzling light, as though Eärendil had himself come down from the high sunset paths with the last Silmaril upon his brow."

— Book 4, ch. 9 "Shelob's Lair"

Sam uses the Phial to defeat the Watchers of the tower of Cirith Ungol. (Note: Tolkien 1954, Book 6, ch. 1 "The Tower of Cirith Ungol") However, its power is no match for Sauron's; when the hobbits try to use it again as they approach Mount Doom, its light dims. (Note: Tolkien 1955, Book 6, ch. 3 "Mount Doom")

After destroying the Ring and Sauron, Frodo leaves Middle-earth from the Grey Havens. As he takes the Phial with him, its light fades and disappears while Sam watches from the Western shore. (Note: Tolkien 1955, Book 6, ch. 9 "The Grey Havens")

== Concept and creation ==
The Phial of Galadriel appears late in the writing of The Lord of the Rings. When J. R. R. Tolkien reached the chapter "Farewell to Lothlórien", he wrote four versions of the chapter without any mention of the Phial, although the distribution of gifts to other members of the Fellowship appears in the third version. It is only in the fifth version of the chapter that the Phial appears, in terms almost identical to those of the final text. (Note: Tolkien 1989, pp. 274–277)

In a summary of events at the end of the story, its light enables Frodo, locked in the tower of Cirith Ungol, to see Sauron's forces massing at the Black Gate to face the approaching army of the West a hundred miles away. Christopher Tolkien, editing his father's mass of texts, comments: "Here the light of the Phial of Galadriel has considerable power, a true star in the darkness". (Note: Tolkien 1989, p. 438, note 15)

== Analysis ==
=== A splinter of the created light ===
Splintering of the Created Light, leading to the Phial of Galadriel
Age	The Light
Years of the Lamps	The two great Lamps, Illuin and Ormal, give light to all of Middle-earth, where the Valar live.
ending when Melkor destroys both Lamps
Years of the Trees	The Valar move to Valinor. The Two Trees of Valinor give light to that realm. Fëanor crafts 3 Silmarils with light from the Two Trees.
ending when Melkor strikes the Two Trees, and Ungoliant kills them
First Age	Last flower becomes the Moon, last fruit becomes the Sun.
First Age	There is war over the Silmarils.
First Age	One Silmaril is buried in the Earth, one is lost in the Sea, one sails in the Sky as Eärendil's Star.
Second Age	Seedling Nimloth becomes the White Tree of Númenor.
Second Age	Númenor is drowned. Isildur brings one fruit of Nimloth to Gondor in Middle-earth.
Third Age	Galadriel collects light of Eärendil's Star reflected in her fountain mirror.
Third Age	A little of that light is captured in the Phial of Galadriel.
Third Age	Hobbits Frodo Baggins and Sam Gamgee use the Phial to defeat the giant spider Shelob, and the Watchers of the tower of Cirith Ungol.

For the Tolkien scholar Verlyn Flieger in her book Splintered Light, light is a powerful symbol of divine creation. Little of that ancient light remains in the Third Age, but the Phial's light is a surviving fragment of the light of Eärendil's star. Flieger likens the Phial's stature to Frodo's: it is a splinter of the created light, just as Frodo is a "broken down" fragment of humanity. She suggests contrasting the Phial with the One Ring, as both are called "presents" or "gifts": the Phial is an object of light, the Ring an object of darkness.

For Rosalia Fernandez-Colmeiro, the Phial of Galadriel illustrates the relationship between water and light in Tolkien's work: the light of Eärendil's Silmaril is captured by the water of Galadriel's fountain. Likewise, with its origin in Lothlórien, a forest with axis mundi characteristics, and its power derived from a star, the Phial of Galadriel helps to establish The Lord of the Rings in a mythical space-time.

Sam Gamgee reflects on the light in the Phial

'Beren now, he never thought he was going to get that Silmaril from the Iron Crown in Thangorodrim, and yet he did, and that was a worse place and a blacker danger than ours. But that’s a long tale, of course, and goes on past the happiness and into grief and beyond it—and the Silmaril went on and came to Eärendil. And why, sir, I never thought of that before! We've got—you've got some of the light of it in that star-glass that the Lady gave you! Why, to think of it, we're in the same tale still! It’s going on. Don't the great tales never end?'

— The Lord of the Rings, book 4, ch. 8 "The Stairs of Cirith Ungol"

The Phial links the Third Age events of The Lord of the Rings to the tales of the Elder Days in The Silmarillion, as does Galadriel herself. The light of the Phial is a tiny part of the light of the vala Elbereth, who created the stars and blessed the Silmarils, and to whom Samwise appeals in the face of Shelob. In the end, the Phial is used to defeat Shelob, a descendant of Ungoliant, the monstrous servant of Morgoth who had destroyed the light-giving Two Trees of Valinor. The link with The Silmarillion is explicit, as Samwise Gamgee evokes Beren on the stairs of Cirith Ungol, shortly before meeting the spider. The Phial is effective not only because it contains the light of Valinor, but also because it is a "manifestation of history, of time fulfilled."

=== Light against darkness ===
For Marjorie Burns, the Phial of Galadriel is one of the elements that indicate the contrasting characters of Galadriel and Shelob: its light contrasts with the darkness of the spider.

In Burns's view, the Phial serves to bring Galadriel's character closer to the Irish goddess The Morrígan, who uses a pale, liquid potion contained in a glass phial.

Robert Steed writes that Tolkien "creatively adapts" the medieval theme of the Harrowing of Hell for several occasions in his legendarium where his protagonists parallel what was believed to be Christ's descent into Hell, setting the Devil's captives free with the irresistible power of his divine light. Steed comments that Sam was an "odd" fit for the pattern of the Christ-like irresistible force, but in the narrative he indeed plays the part of the "light-bearing liberator at the center of the Harrowing of Hell motif".

The Episcopal priest and Tolkien scholar Fleming Rutledge writes that in Sam's attack on Shelob, the light of the Phial of Galadriel "leapt as if 'from the firmament with intolerable light.'" She comments that Tolkien's choice of the word "firmament", with its Biblical ring, indicates the "divine presence", while the "intolerable light" recalls the overpowering light that blinded the Apostle Paul in the New Testament, and which lit up the face of the prophet Moses in the Old Testament.

Sarah Downey, in the journal Mythlore, likens Galadriel to a guide-figure such as Dante's Beatrice in his Divine Comedy, and the Phial "a continued guidance" for Frodo after he has left Lothlórien. Further, she notes that the Phial holds "the light of Eärendil's star, set amid the waters of my fountain", and that Sam voices Galadriel's association with both light and water. Downey comments that like Galadriel, the pearl-maiden in the medieval English poem Pearl is seen in white and gold, while Beatrice shimmers "clothed in the colour of a living flame". The light-bearing Phial, then, connects Galadriel with the celestial ladies of the Middle Ages.

=== Water of baptism ===
Jason Fisher draws a parallel between the water in the Phial and the Christian sacrament of baptism, noting that Tolkien recognized the similarities between the character of Galadriel and Mary, mother of Jesus. The Phial is akin to charismata, spiritual gifts, in line with Jesus's words in the Book of Revelation: "And he that overcometh, and keepeth my works unto the end, [...] I will give the Morning Star" (2:26–28); in Tolkien's legendarium, the Morning Star corresponds to the Silmaril carried by Eärendil, whose light the Phial captures. The Episcopal priest and Tolkien scholar Fleming Rutledge similarly comments that the Phial is "filled with baptismal water".

== Adaptations ==
Sam Gamgee using the Phial of Galadriel to dazzle and defeat Shelob. The prop was made by Wētā Workshop to match Tolkien's description.

The Phial of Galadriel has been illustrated by Tolkien artists including John Howe, Anke Eißmann, and Ted Nasmith. The Phial appears in Peter Jackson's film trilogy, both in The Fellowship of the Ring where Galadriel presents Frodo with the gift, and in The Return of the King where Frodo and Sam use it to get through the Pass of Cirith Ungol, its light dazzling Shelob the giant spider. The prop was made in accordance with Tolkien's written description by Wētā Workshop. There are two Phial of Galadriel cards in the Lord of the Rings Trading Card Game.
