= Galadriel =

Character in J. R. R. Tolkien's Middle-earth

- Middle-earth character
- First appearance: "The Fellowship of the Ring"; The Lord of the Rings; 1954
- Created by: J. R. R. Tolkien

In-universe information
- Race: Elf (Noldor / Teleri)
- Title: Lady of Lórien
- Spouse: Celeborn
- Children: Celebrían
- Relatives: Arwen (granddaughter); Elrond (son-in-law); Finwë (grandfather); Fingolfin (uncle)
- Home: Lothlórien
- Book(s): The Fellowship of the Ring (1954); The Return of the King (1955); The Silmarillion (1977); Unfinished Tales (1980)

Galadriel (IPA: [ɡaˈladri.ɛl]) is a character created by J. R. R. Tolkien in his Middle-earth writings. She appears in The Lord of the Rings, The Silmarillion, and Unfinished Tales. She was a royal Elf of both the Noldor and the Teleri, being a grandchild of both King Finwë and King Olwë. She was also close kin of King Ingwë of the Vanyar through her grandmother Indis. Galadriel was a leader during the rebellion of the Noldor, and present in their flight from Valinor during the First Age. Towards the end of her stay in Middle-earth, she was joint ruler of Lothlórien with her husband, Celeborn, when she was known as the Lady of Lórien, the Lady of the Galadhrim, the Lady of Light, or the Lady of the Golden Wood. Her daughter Celebrían was the wife of Elrond and mother of Arwen, Elladan, and Elrohir. Tolkien describes her as "the mightiest and fairest of all the Elves that remained in Middle-earth" (after the death of Gil-galad) (Note: Tolkien 1977, "Of the Rings of Power and the Third Age") and the "greatest of elven women". (Note: Tolkien 1955, Appendix B, "The Tale of Years")

The Tolkien scholar Tom Shippey has written that Galadriel represented Tolkien's attempt to re-create the kind of elf hinted at by surviving references in Old English. He has compared his elves also to those in a Christian Middle English source, The Early South English Legendary, where the elves were angels. The scholar of English Sarah Downey likens Galadriel to a celestial lady of medieval allegory, a guide-figure such as Dante's Beatrice and the pearl-maiden in the 14th-century English poem Pearl. Another scholar, Marjorie Burns, compares Galadriel in multiple details to Rider Haggard's heroine Ayesha, and to Tennyson's The Lady of Shalott, both being reworked figures of Arthurian legend. Galadriel, lady of light, assisting Frodo on his quest to destroy the One Ring, opposed to Shelob, the giant and evil female spider of darkness, have been compared to Homer's opposed female characters in the Odyssey: Circe and Calypso as Odysseus's powerful and wise benefactors on his quest, against the perils of the attractive Sirens, and the deadly Scylla and Charybdis.

Modern songwriters have created songs about Galadriel; Tolkien's Quenya poem "Namárië" has been set to music by Donald Swann. Galadriel has appeared in both animated and live-action films and television. Cate Blanchett played her in Peter Jackson's film series, while Morfydd Clark played her in an earlier age in The Lord of the Rings: The Rings of Power.

== Fictional biography ==
=== First Age ===
Stories of Galadriel's life before the War of the Ring appear in The Silmarillion and Unfinished Tales. (Note: Tolkien 1980, 4. "The History of Galadriel and Celeborn", "Concerning Galadriel and Celeborn") She was born in Valinor, a member of the royal House of Finwë. She was the only daughter and youngest child of Finarfin, prince of the Noldor, and of Eärwen, daughter of Olwë and cousin to Lúthien. Her elder brothers were Finrod Felagund, Angrod, and Aegnor. Galadriel was often called the fairest of all Elves, whether in Aman or Middle-earth. She could peer into the minds of others to judge them fairly.

According to the older account of her story, sketched by Tolkien in The Road Goes Ever On and used in The Silmarillion, Galadriel was an eager participant and leader in the rebellion of the Noldor and their flight from Valinor; she was the "only female to stand tall in those days". (Note: Tolkien 1977, "Quenta Silmarillion", ch. 9 "Of the Flight of the Noldor") (Note: Tolkien 1980, part 2, ch. 4 "The History of Galadriel and Celeborn" discusses "the reasons and motives given for Galadriel's remaining in Middle-earth", citing The Road Goes Ever On.) She had, however, long since parted ways with Fëanor and his sons. In Beleriand she lived with her brother Finrod Felagund at Nargothrond and the court of Thingol and Melian in Doriath. She carried some dark secrets from those times; she told Melian part of the violent story of the Silmarils and Morgoth's killing of Finwë, but did not mention the kinslaying of elves by elves. (Note: Tolkien 1977, "Quenta Silmarillion", ch. 15 "Of the Noldor in Beleriand")

=== Second Age ===
Galadriel and Celeborn travelled first to Lindon, where they ruled over a group of Elves, and were themselves ruled by Gil-galad. According to Concerning Galadriel and Celeborn, they then removed to the shores of Lake Nenuial (Evendim) and were accounted the Lord and Lady of all the Elves of Eriador. Later, they moved eastward and established the realm of Eregion (Hollin). They made contact with a Nandorin settlement in the valley of the River Anduin, which became Lothlórien. At some point, Celeborn and Galadriel left Eregion and settled in Lothlórien. According to some of Tolkien's accounts, they became rulers of Lothlórien for a time during the Second Age; but in all accounts they returned to Lórien to take up its rule after Amroth was lost in the middle of the Third Age. Celeborn and Galadriel had a daughter, Celebrían, who married Elrond Half-elven of Rivendell.

During the Second Age, when the Rings of Power were forged, Galadriel distrusted Annatar, the loremaster who taught the craft of the Rings to Celebrimbor. Again according to some of the accounts, Celebrimbor rebelled against her view and seized power in Eregion. As a result, Galadriel departed to Lórien via the gates of Moria, but Celeborn refused to enter the dwarves' stronghold and stayed behind. Her distrust was justified, for Annatar turned out to be the Dark Lord, Sauron. When Sauron attacked Eregion, Celebrimbor entrusted Galadriel with Nenya, one of the Three Rings of the Elves. Celeborn joined up with Elrond, whose force was unable to relieve Eregion but managed to escape back to Imladris. Celeborn reunited with Galadriel when the war ended; according to one text, after some years in Imladris (during which Elrond first saw and fell in love with Celebrían) Galadriel's sea-longing became so strong that the couple removed to Belfalas and lived at the place later called Dol Amroth.

=== Third Age ===
'And now at last it comes. You will give me the Ring freely! In place of the Dark Lord you will set up a Queen. And I shall not be dark, but beautiful and terrible as the Morning and the Night! Fair as the Sea and the Sun and the Snow upon the Mountain! Dreadful as the Storm and the Lightning! Stronger than the foundations of the earth. All shall love me and despair!' [Galadriel] lifted up her hand and from the ring that she wore there issued a great light that illumined her alone and left all else dark... Then she let her hand fall, and the light faded, and suddenly she laughed again, and lo! she was shrunken: a slender elf-woman, clad in simple white, whose gentle voice was soft and sad. 'I pass the test', she said. 'I will diminish, and go into the West, and remain Galadriel'.

— J. R. R. Tolkien, The Fellowship of the Ring

In The Fellowship of the Ring, Galadriel welcomed the Fellowship to Lothlórien after their escape from Moria. (Note: Tolkien 1954a, book 2 ch. 6 "Lothlórien") When she met the Fellowship in her tree-dwelling she gave each member a searching look, testing their resolve—though Boromir interpreted this test as a temptation. She was in turn tested when Frodo Baggins offered to place the Ring in her keeping. Knowing that its corrupting influence would make her "great and terrible", and recalling the ambitions that had once brought her to Middle-earth, she refused the Ring. She accepted that her own ring's power would fail, that her people would diminish and fade with the One Ring's destruction, and that her only escape from the fading of the Elves and the dominion of Men would be to return at last to Valinor. (Note: Tolkien 1954a, book 2 ch. 7 "The Mirror of Galadriel")

When the Fellowship left Lothlórien, she gave each member a gift and an Elven cloak, and furnished the party with supplies, both as practical support and as a symbol of faith, hope and goodwill. Her gift to Frodo was the magical Phial of Galadriel, containing a little of the light of Eärendil's star. Her husband Celeborn likewise provided the Fellowship with Elven-boats. (Note: Tolkien 1954a, book 2 ch. 8 "Farewell to Lórien") On the day that the Fellowship left Lórien, but unknown to them, Gandalf arrived, carried by the eagle Gwaihir. Galadriel healed his wounds and re-clothed him in white, signalling his new status as head of the Istari, the order of wizards. (Note: Tolkien 1954, book 3, ch. 5 "The White Rider")

After Sauron perished, Celeborn led the host of Lórien across the Anduin and captured Dol Guldur. Galadriel came forth and "threw down its walls and laid bare its pits". She travelled to Minas Tirith for the wedding of her granddaughter Arwen to King Aragorn. Galadriel passed over the Great Sea with Elrond, Gandalf, and the Ring-bearers Bilbo and Frodo, marking the end of the Third Age. (Note: Tolkien 1955, book 6, ch. 9 "The Grey Havens") Celeborn remained behind, and Tolkien writes that "there is no record of the day when at last he sought the Grey Havens". (Note: Tolkien 1954a, "Prologue", "Note on the Shire Records")

=== Characteristics ===
The Dúnedain said that her height was two rangar, or "man-high" – around 6 feet 4 inches (193 cm). (Note: Tolkien 1980, part 3, ch. 1 "The Disaster of the Gladden Fields: Appendix (Númenórean Linear Measures)") However, Galadriel's most striking feature was her beautiful, long, silver-golden hair. (Note: Tolkien 1980, part 2, ch. 4 "The History of Galadriel and Celeborn") (Note: Carpenter 2023, #348 to C. Findlay, March 1973) According to the late essay The Shibboleth of Fëanor (referring to Galadriel's rebellious exile and Celeborn as a Teler), the Elves of Tirion said it captured the radiance of the Two Trees Laurelin and Telperion themselves.

Even among the Eldar she was accounted beautiful, and her hair is held a marvel unmatched. It is golden like the hair of her father and of her foremother Indis, but richer and more radiant, for its gold is touched by some memory of the starlike silver of her mother; and the Eldar say that the light of the Two Trees, Laurelin and Telperion, has been snared in her tresses.

Fëanor greatly admired her hair; it may have inspired him to create the Silmarils.

Many thought that this saying first gave to Fëanor the thought of imprisoning and blending the light of the Trees that later took shape in his hands as the Silmarils. For Fëanor beheld the hair of Galadriel with wonder and delight.

Nevertheless, Galadriel never repaid Fëanor's admiration. Fëanor "had begged her thrice for a tress and thrice she refused to give him even one hair. It is said that these two kinsfolk, being considered the greatest of the Eldar of Valinor, remain unfriends forever."

Her character was a blend of characteristics of the Eldar from whom she was descended. She had the pride and ambition of the Noldor, but in her they were tempered by the gentleness and insight of the Vanyar. She shared the latter virtues of character with her father Finarfin and her brother Finrod.

She was proud, strong, and self-willed, as were all the descendants of Finwë save Finarfin; and like her brother Finrod, of all her kin the nearest to her heart, she had dreams of far lands and dominions that might be her own to order as she would without tutelage. Yet deeper still there dwelt in her the noble and generous spirit of the Vanyar, and a reverence for the Valar that she could not forget. From her earliest years she had a marvellous gift of insight into the minds of others, but judged them with mercy and understanding, and she withheld her goodwill from none save only Fëanor. In him she perceived a darkness that she hated and feared, though she did not perceive that the shadow of the same evil had fallen upon the minds of all the Noldor, and upon her own.

Galadriel's sympathy for Gimli the Dwarf, when she rebuked her husband Celeborn for being tempted to regret his decision to admit a Dwarf to Lothlórien, completely won him over.

=== Relationships ===
Family tree (Note: Tolkien 1996, "The Shibboleth of Fëanor")

Melian the Maia	Thingol	Elmo §	Olwë of the Teleri	Finwë of the Noldor	Indis of the Vanyar
Galadhon §	Eärwen	Finarfin
Lúthien	Galathil §	Celeborn	Galadriel	Angrod	Edhellos ¶	Finrod	Aegnor
Dior	Nimloth	Orodreth ¶
Eluréd	Elurín	Elwing	Finduilas	Gil-galad ¶
Elros	Elrond	Celebrían
Tar-Elendil
Silmariën	Tar-Meneldur
Elendil	Ar-Pharazôn
Isildur	Anárion
Arvedui	Fíriel
Aranarth
Aragorn	Arwen	Elladan	Elrohir
Eldarion

Colour key:
Colour	Description
	Elves
	Men
	Maiar
	Half-elven
	Half-elven who chose the fate of elves
	Half-elven who chose the fate of mortal men

§ These figures appear in Unfinished Tales, but not in the published Silmarillion. The pre-1968 descent of Celeborn (as a Sinda) is shown. In later texts, Celeborn (as a Teler) is specified at various times to be the son of Gilitīro (Note: Tolkien 2024, p. 143) and the grandson of Olwë.

¶ In the published Silmarillion, Edhellos does not appear, Orodreth is Finarfin's son (and still Finduilas' father), and Gil-galad is Fingon's son (and thus would not be on this tree).

== Late changes ==
Late in life, Tolkien made several changes to the story of Galadriel and Celeborn. In The Lord of the Rings, Celeborn is called a "kinsman of Thingol"; (Note: Tolkien 1955, Appendix B) in The Road Goes Ever On he is described as one of the Sindar. The Silmarillion adds that Galadriel and Celeborn met in Doriath. (Note: Tolkien 1977, "Quenta Silmarillion", ch. 13 "Of the Return of the Noldor") Tolkien changed his mind in texts dating from c. 1968 onwards, making Celeborn a Telerin Elf of Alqualondë. (Note: Carpenter 2023, #347 to Richard Jeffery, 17 December 1972) This meant that he was still a kinsman of Thingol, but only "afar off". In this late conception, the two had met in Aman.

Between 1967 and 1971, Tolkien several times mentioned that Galadriel was banned from returning to Valinor, since she had been a leader in the revolt of the Noldor (the only surviving one in the late Third Age). (Note: Tolkien 1996, "Of Dwarves and Men") (Note: Carpenter 2023, #297, drafts for a letter to 'Mr Rang', August 1967) (Note: Carpenter 2023, #320 to Mrs Ruth Austin, 25 January 1971) This personal ban was lifted in acknowledgement of her refusal of the Ring and her renunciation of power. Such a ban had not existed at the time The Lord of the Rings was written.

In August 1973, Tolkien decided to rewrite the story entirely, so that Galadriel did not reach Beleriand with the other rebellious Noldor. Instead, she was "unstained" (having done nothing evil), and had wished to go to Middle-earth to exercise her talents. However, just as she and Celeborn (again a Telerin Elf, and this time Olwë's grandson and thus her first cousin) were about to seek the Valar's permission, Valinor was darkened. She did not take part in Fëanor's rebellion, and (with her brother Finrod) fought against him at the Kinslaying; but she nonetheless despaired of Valinor, and sailed into the darkness with Celeborn. (Note: Carpenter 2023, #353 to Lord Halsbury, 4 August 1973) (Note: Tolkien 1993, p. 128) Tolkien died the next month, and thus never completed this revision.

== Analysis ==
=== Reconstructed Old English elf ===
The philologist and Tolkien scholar Tom Shippey notes that in creating Galadriel, Tolkien was attempting to reconstruct the kind of elf hinted at by elf references in Old English (Anglo-Saxon) words. The hints are, he observes, paradoxical: while ælfscyne, "elf-beautiful", suggests a powerful allure, ælfsogoða, "lunacy", implies that getting too close to elves is dangerous. In Shippey's view, Tolkien is telling the literal truth that "beauty is itself dangerous", as Chaucer did in The Wife of Bath's Tale where both elves and friars are sexually rapacious. So when Faramir says to Sam Gamgee in Ithilien that Galadriel must be "perilously fair", Shippey comments that this is a "highly accurate remark"; Sam replies that "folk takes their peril with them into Lorien... But perhaps you could call her perilous, because she's so strong in herself."

=== Angelic being ===
Shippey also considers the Christian Middle English attitude of the South English Legendary, a hagiographic work which he supposes Tolkien must have read, that elves were angels. In his view, Tolkien's elves are much like fallen angels, above Men but below the angelic Maiar and the godlike Valar. He comments at once that Galadriel is in one way certainly not "fallen", as the elves avoided the war on Melkor in the First Age; but all the same, "Galadriel has been expelled from a kind of Heaven, the Deathless land of Valinor, and has been forbidden to return." Shippey suggests that the Men of Middle-earth might have thought the fall of Melkor and the expulsion of Galadriel added up to a similar fallen status; and he praises Tolkien for taking both sides of the story of elves into account.

Alexander Retakh notes that, beyond the inconsistencies in the various backstories of Galadriel, she also exhibits certain inconsistencies within The Lord of the Rings itself. Specifically, in her ability to command the Eagles, be an intercessor with the Valar, and magically pulling down Sauron's stronghold (Dol Guldur), she shows herself to be beyond any other Elf in power, save Lúthien Tinúviel who is half-Maia through her angelic mother Melian. Noting that Tolkien, rather unusually, did not much alter Galadriel's role in The Lord of the Rings after creating her as a character, Retakh suggests that Tolkien was engaging in self-borrowing from the already existing character of Melian.

=== Arthurian figure ===
The Tolkien scholar Marjorie Burns compares Galadriel to Rider Haggard's heroine Ayesha in his 1887 novel She: A History of Adventure, a book that Tolkien acknowledged as an important influence, and to Tennyson's The Lady of Shalott, which recast the Arthurian legend of Elaine of Astolat; she notes that Ayesha was herself an Arthurian figure, transposed to 19th century Africa.

Marjorie Burns's comparison of Galadriel with Ayesha and the Lady of Shalott
Attribute	Galadriel	Ayesha (She)	The Lady of Shalott
Image	Galadriel in front of her mirror Tessa Boronski, 2011	Depiction of She, Holly, Leo, and Job journeying to the cavern containing the Pillar of Life. Ayesha stands on one side of a deep ravine, having crossed over using a plank of wood as a demonstration of its safety. She beckons the three Englishmen to follow her. A great beam of light divides the darkness about them. Edward Killingworth Johnson, 1887	PreRaphaelite oil painting of the Lady of Shalott, finely dressed, on a small boat in a river John William Waterhouse, 1888
Life	immortal Elf	immortal human after entering the flame	"fairy"
Beauty	very fair long blonde hair	men fall to their knees long raven-black hair	great beauty very long dark hair
Wisdom Power	sees more than any man		dangerous and strange
Work	weaving, and overseeing weaver-maidens		weaves continually
Place	isolated realm, sheltered from change		enchanted island
Healing	heals and preserves		enchanted
Magic mirror (dish of water)	sees past, present, "things that may yet be" denies it is magic	sees past and present denies it is magic	"the mirror's magic sights"
Ending	her ring loses power Elves leave and diminish	re-enters the flame shrivels up and dies	relinquishes power and dies

=== Medieval celestial lady ===
Sarah Downey, in Mythlore, likens Galadriel to a medieval guide-figure such as Dante's Beatrice and the pearl-maiden in the 14th-century English poem Pearl. Galadriel is "tall and white and fair", while the pearl-maiden appears in white and gold, and Beatrice shimmers "clothed in the colour of a living flame". In Downey's view, Galadriel's colours, and her association with both light and with water, connect her with the celestial ladies of the Middle Ages. On the other hand, those figures are allegorical. Downey notes that Tolkien's protestation that he "cordially dislike[d] allegory" has not spared him from much analysis of his writings to be interpreted, but states that Galadriel appears as a fully-fledged figure of "history, true or feigned", with problems of her own making, rather than being a flat allegorical symbol of goodness and purity. The fact that Galadriel is a "penitent" seeking readmission to Aman, Downey comments, makes it clear, too, that she cannot be straightforwardly equated with a figure of perfection like the Virgin Mary.

Sarah Downey's comparison of Galadriel with the Pearl-maiden and Dante's celestial ladies
Attribute	Galadriel	Pearl-maiden	Dante's Matelda	Dante's Beatrice
Image	Galadriel allowing Frodo to look into her mirror-fountain, the light of a star shining through her ring-finger. Alexander Korotich, scraperboard, 1981	The Pearl-maiden is across the stream from the Dreamer. Cotton MS Nero A X	Matelda, Dante, and Virgil in the Earthly Paradise. John William Waterhouse, c. 1915	Dante sees Beatrice (centre) by the River Arno in Florence. Henry Holiday, 1883
Celestial lady who gives guidance	Lady of Lothlórien	yes	yes	yes
Earthly Paradise	Lothlórien is like Aman, but in Middle-earth	Otherworldly garden, Heaven just across the stream	Guides Dante through the Garden of Eden	At top of Mount Purgatory, near but not in Heaven
River-as-boundary	Between two rivers	Clear stream, with Heaven on far side	Bathes Dante in river Lethe	Across a pure stream
Dreamlike time	Timeless land; Elves are immortal	is dead	is dead	is dead
Allegorical	No, she is "penitent", a fully-developed character	yes	yes	yes
Ordeal, loss, death	yes, Gandalf has just been lost in Moria	yes	yes	yes
Water and light	"tall and white and fair"; light of Eärendil's star, Phial of Galadriel; bears Nenya, the Ring of Water	white and gold		"clothed in the colour of a living flame"
Vision and redemption	Sam sees destruction in the Shire in Galadriel's Mirror; Frodo glimpses "parts of a great history in which he had become involved", is enjoined not to touch the water; test is for Galadriel (not the narrator), tempted to take the One Ring	Narrator looks across the stream to the Heavenly Jerusalem; he jumps into stream and wakes up		Dante's vision within a vision, a pageant with Beatrice

=== Marian figure ===
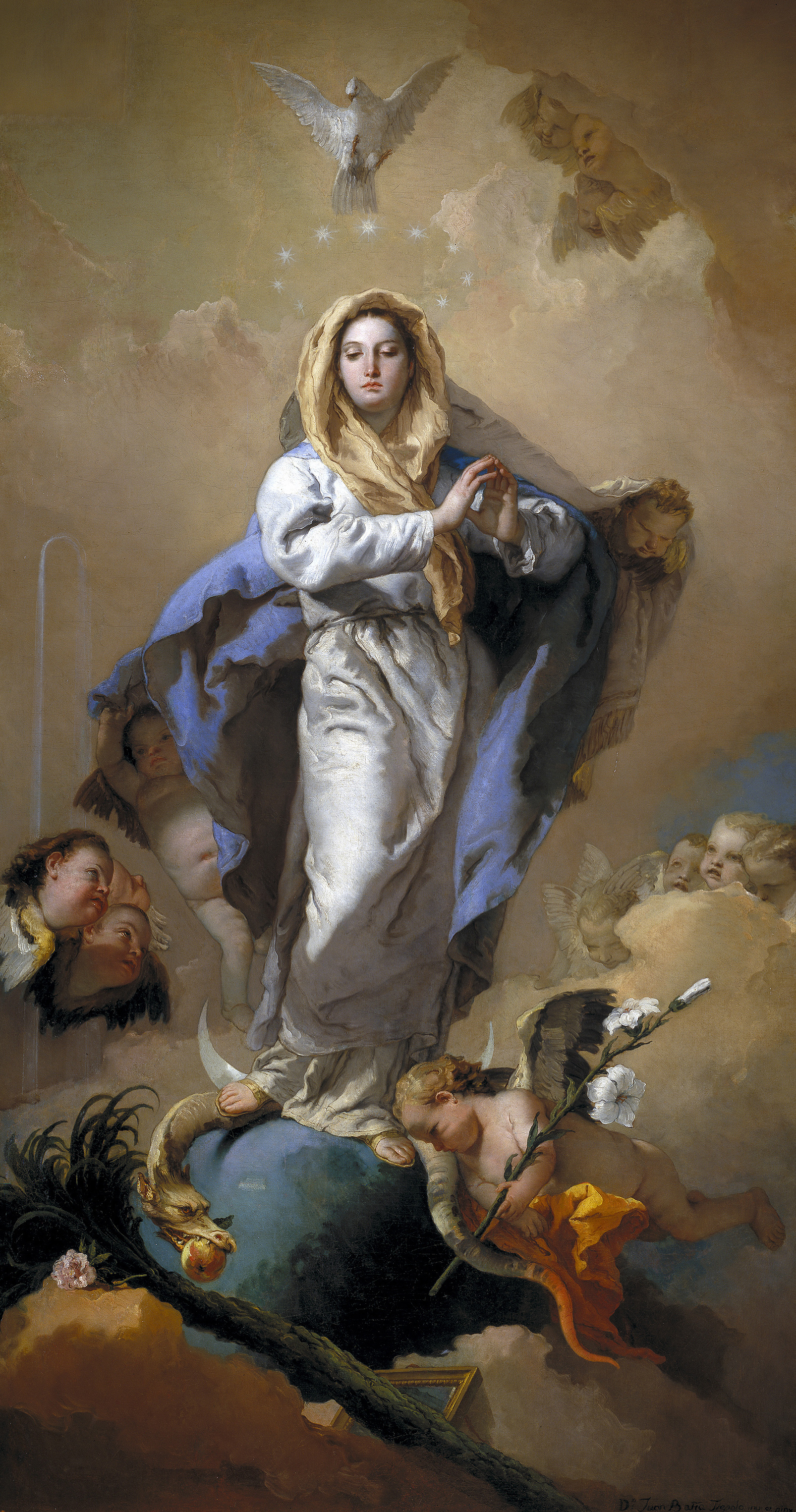
Tolkien varied his accounts of Galadriel. In 1973 he called her "unstained", implying a Marian figure. Painting by Tiepolo

In Tolkien's August 1973 draft, Galadriel is exonerated and not a penitent. Jane Beal writes that Tolkien's calling her "unstained" and having "committed no evil deeds" makes Galadriel into a Marian figure. Lakowski, writing that "second thoughts aren't always better", quotes Shippey as calling this revision an example of "soft-heartedness" on Tolkien's part, but also suggests another possible reason: that Tolkien realised that the narratives with a banned and repentant Galadriel are somewhat inconsistent with Galadriel's characterisation in The Lord of the Rings. Lakowski states that Galadriel's pure whiteness indicates that Tolkien modelled her on the Virgin Mary. The theologian Ralph C. Wood writes that Galadriel somewhat resembles Dante Alighieri's portrayal of Mary in his Inferno.

In a 1971 letter, Tolkien wrote both supporting this view, and refuting the suggestion of her total purity:

I think it is true that I owe much of this character to Christian and Catholic teaching and imagination about Mary, but actually Galadriel was a penitent: in her youth a leader in the rebellion against the Valar (the angelic guardians)... She was pardoned...

Beal suggests that, at the end of his life, Tolkien may have been influenced by his readers' interpretations of Galadriel as a Marian figure to consider her in that way herself.

=== Homeric benefactor ===
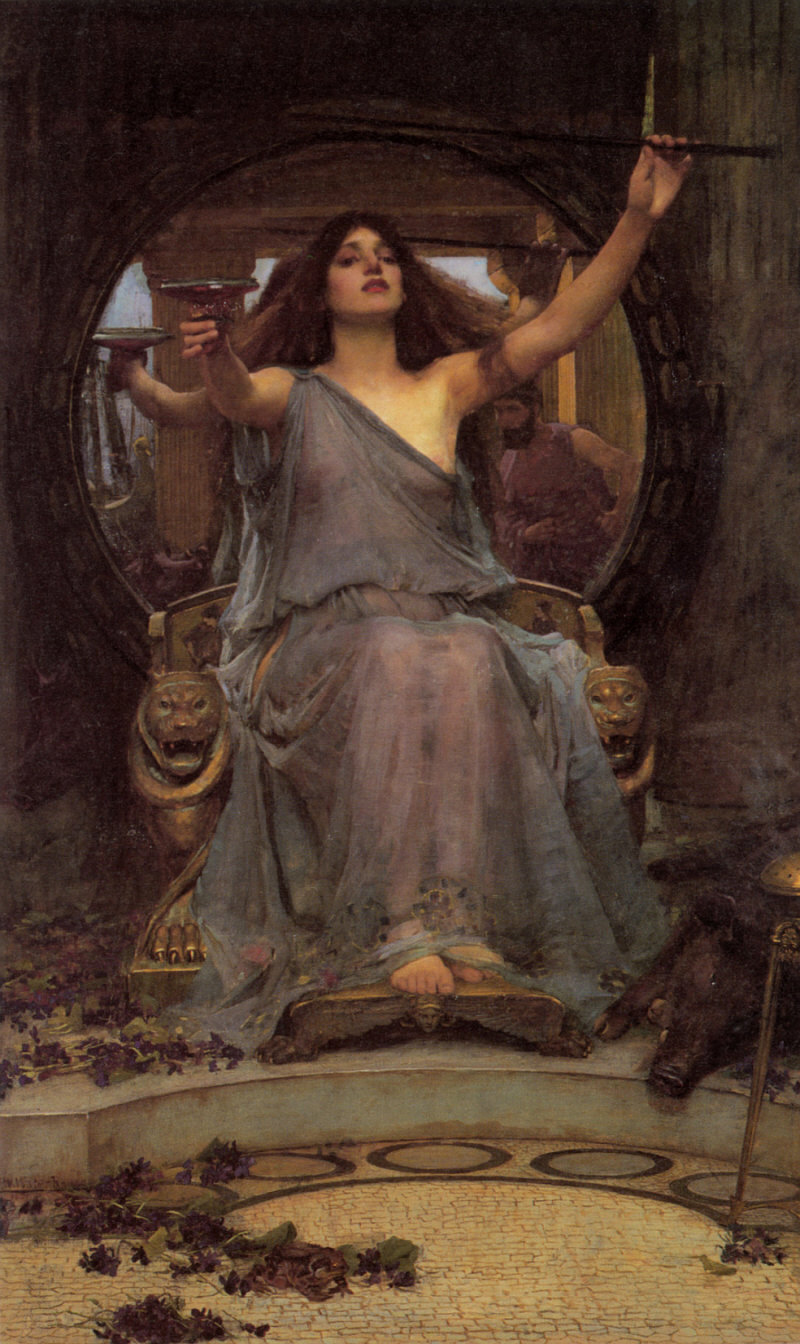
Galadriel's support of the Fellowship of the Ring has been compared to that of Circe and Calypso for Odysseus in Homer's epic. Circe Offering the Cup to Odysseus by John William Waterhouse, 1891.

The Tolkien scholar Mac Fenwick compares Galadriel and what he sees as her monstrous opposite, the giant and evil spider Shelob, with the struggle between the good and the monstrous female characters in Homer's Odyssey. Like Galadriel, Circe and Calypso are rulers of their own secluded magical realms, and both offer help and advice to the protagonist. They help Odysseus to avoid destruction by the female monsters, the Sirens who would lure his ship on to the rocks, and Scylla and Charybdis who would smash or drown his ship; Galadriel gives Frodo the Phial of Galadriel, which by her power contains the light of Eärendil's star, able to blind and ward off Shelob in her darkest of dark lairs. Galadriel's gifts, too, are Homeric, including cloaks, food, and wisdom as well as light, just like those of Circe and Calypso.

Mac Fenwick's comparison of Galadriel with the Homeric Circe and Calypso
Attribute	Galadriel	Circe and Calypso
Place	own magical realm	
Assistance	help and advice	
Monstrous opposites	Shelob, giant spider of darkness	Sirens, Scylla and Charybdis, who would destroy his ship
Gifts	cloaks, food, wisdom, light	

=== Jungian archetypes ===
Diagram of Patrick Grant's Jungian view of the hero Frodo with Galadriel as his anima, opposed by Shelob

Patrick Grant, a scholar of Renaissance literature, notes the multiple character pairings in The Lord of the Rings. He interprets the interactions of the characters as fitting the oppositions and other pairwise relationships of Jungian archetypes, recurring psychological symbols proposed by the psychotherapist Carl Jung. He states that the hero's quest can be interpreted as a personal journey of individuation. Galadriel functions as Frodo's anima, opposed by the evil giant female spider Shelob. Grant explains that the anima and animus represent "the feminine side of a man's unconscious, and the masculine side of a woman's, respectively." He adds that in the case of Tolkien's writing, the anima is more important, but also "ambivalent", both supportive and destructive. He gives as examples of the supportive and "nourishing" anima Dante's Beatrice, the Muses of classical mythology who provided creative inspiration, and the Virgin Mary; on the destructive side, she can be symbolised, he writes, by the siren of mythology who lures a man to disaster, or a "poisonous and malevolent" witch. Grant states that the anima and animus are "further from consciousness" than the shadow archetype. Both the anima/animus and the shadow are presented in conjunction with the hero archetype, signifying an "individuation process which is approaching wholeness". The set of archetypes creates an image of the self. Burns adds that the opposed characters of Galadriel and Shelob are indicated by elements such as the Phial of Galadriel, whose light contrasts with the darkness of the spider.

== Legacy in music ==
Tolkien wrote a poem "Namárië" that Galadriel sings in farewell to the departing Fellowship, and to Frodo in particular. The song is in Quenya, and "spoke of things little-known in Middle-earth," but Frodo is said to have remembered the words and translated them long afterward. It is a lament in which Galadriel describes her separation from the Blessed Realm and the Valar, her longing to return there, and at the end a wish or hope that even though she herself is forbidden (by the Ban) to return, that Frodo might somehow come in the end to the city of Valimar in Valinor. The poem was set to music by Donald Swann, using the melody that Tolkien hummed to him. The sheet music and an audio recording are part of the song-cycle of The Road Goes Ever On. In a recording, Tolkien sings it in the style of a Gregorian chant.

Hijaz
Howard Shore used the Arabic maqam Hijaz scale to give the Lothlórien/Galadriel theme a sense of antiquity.

Galadriel's songs are omitted from Howard Shore's music for The Lord of the Rings film series; instead, Shore created a Lothlórien/Galadriel theme using the Arabic maqam Hijaz scale to create a sense of antiquity. (Note: Lothlórien/Galadriel theme Archived 11 March 2007 at the Wayback Machine (listening sample)) Fran Walsh, Shore, and Annie Lennox co-wrote the Oscar-winning song "Into the West" for the closing credits of The Lord of the Rings: The Return of the King. Originally sung by Lennox, the song was conceived as Galadriel's bittersweet lament for those who have sailed across the Sundering Seas. The lyrics include phrases from the final chapter of the original novel. The song has since been covered by Yulia Townsend and Will Martin.

On their album Once Again, the band Barclay James Harvest featured a song called "Galadriel". It gained notability because guitarist John Lees played John Lennon's Epiphone Casino guitar on this track, an event later recounted in a song on the band's 1990 album Welcome To The Show titled "John Lennon's Guitar". Hank Marvin and John Farrar wrote a song "Galadriel", recorded by Cliff Richard; the four five-line stanzas include the couplet "Galadriel, spirit of starlight / Eagle and dove gave birth to thee". An Australian band named Galadriel released a self-titled album in 1971 which "became a highly sought-after collectors' item among European progressive rock circles".

== Adaptations ==
Galadriel in Ralph Bakshi's animated version of The Lord of the Rings

Galadriel was voiced by Annette Crosbie in Ralph Bakshi's 1978 animated film of The Lord of the Rings, and by Marian Diamond in BBC Radio's 1981 serialisation. She did not appear in the 1980 animated The Return of the King, but was mentioned by name when Frodo refers to "Galadriel's phial".

Cate Blanchett as Galadriel in Peter Jackson's The Lord of the Rings: The Fellowship of the Ring

In Peter Jackson's Lord of the Rings and The Hobbit trilogies, Galadriel is played by Cate Blanchett. In The Lord of the Rings: The Fellowship of the Ring, Galadriel narrates the prologue that explains the creation of the One Ring, as well as appearing in Lothlórien. While Galadriel does not feature in Tolkien's The Hobbit, the story was changed so that she could appear in Jackson's films based on the book.

On stage, Galadriel was portrayed by Rebecca Jackson Mendoza in the 2006 Toronto musical production of The Lord of the Rings; Mendoza's dress was hand-embroidered with 1,800 beads. The musical was revised and moved to London's Theatre Royal, Drury Lane in 2007, with Laura Michelle Kelly in the "glittering" role.

Galadriel appears in video games such as The Lord of the Rings: The Battle for Middle-earth II, where she is voiced by Lani Minella.

In the 2022 television series The Lord of the Rings: The Rings of Power, Galadriel was portrayed by Morfydd Clark, and her younger version by Amelie Child Villiers.
