= Shelob =

Fictional giant spider from The Lord of the Rings

- Middle-earth character

In-universe information
- Race: Spider
- Book(s): The Two Towers (1954)
- Film(s): The Return of the King (2003)

Shelob is a fictional monster in the form of a giant spider from J. R. R. Tolkien's The Lord of the Rings. Her lair lies in Cirith Ungol ("the pass of the spider") leading into Mordor. The creature Gollum deliberately leads the Hobbit protagonist Frodo there in hopes of recovering the One Ring by letting Shelob attack Frodo. The plan is foiled when Samwise Gamgee temporarily blinds Shelob with the Phial of Galadriel, and then severely wounds her with Frodo's Elvish sword, Sting.

Some scholars have stated that Shelob is in the literary tradition of female monsters. Others have interpreted her as symbolising a sexual threat, with multiple allusions to reproductive organs. Scholars have noted her opposition to the Elves, and in particular her adversary, Galadriel, whose light helps the hobbits to defeat her darkness.

Shelob's physical appearance in Peter Jackson's film trilogy was based on the New Zealand tunnel-web spider.

== Fictional history ==
Shelob is described in The Two Towers as an "evil thing in spider-form...[the] last child of Ungoliant to trouble the unhappy world", (Note: Tolkien 1954, book 4, chapter 9: "Shelob's Lair.") living high in the Ephel Dúath mountains on the borders of Mordor. Although she resided in Mordor and was unrepentantly evil, she was independent of Sauron and his influence. Her exact size is not stated, but she is significantly larger than her descendants, the Great Spiders of Mirkwood, and her hobbit opponents. She has a powerful bite to inject her venom and paralyse or kill her victims. Her hide is tough enough to resist sword-strokes, and the strings of her webs are likewise resilient to ordinary blades, though the magical Sting manages to cut them. Her main weak point is her eyes, which can be easily harmed or blinded. (Note: Tolkien 1954, book 4, chapter 8: "The Stairs of Cirith Ungol")

She is introduced as both evil and ancient: "But still she was there, who was there before Sauron, and before the first stone of Barad-dûr; and she served none but herself, drinking the blood of Elves and Men, bloated and grown fat with endless brooding on her feasts, weaving webs of shadow; for all living things were her food, and her vomit darkness". Her descendants include the Giant Spiders of Mirkwood defeated by Bilbo Baggins in The Hobbit.

Shelob's lair was Torech Ungol, below Cirith Ungol ("Pass of the Spider"), along the path that the Hobbits Frodo Baggins and Sam Gamgee took into Mordor, where Shelob had encountered Gollum during his previous trip to Mordor, and he apparently worshipped her. The Orcs of the Tower of Cirith Ungol called her "Shelob the Great" and "Her Ladyship", and referred to Gollum as "Her Sneak". Sauron was aware of her existence, but left her alone as a useful guard on the pass, and occasionally fed prisoners to her. In the story, Gollum deliberately led Frodo and Sam into her lair, planning to recover the One Ring once she had consumed the hobbits. She cornered them; but Frodo used the Phial of Galadriel's light to drive her off, and used Sting to cut the webs blocking the tunnel. Gollum waylaid the pair and tried to strangle Sam, while Shelob paralysed Frodo; but Sam fought off Gollum and then wielded Sting against Shelob. Seeking to crush Sam, she instead impaled herself upon Sting; and, being evil, was nearly blinded by the Phial of Galadriel, containing pure light from the Silmarils; whereupon she fled. Her eventual fate, Tolkien mentions in passing, "this tale does not tell." Thinking Frodo dead, Sam took the Ring from his friend and left his body behind in a bid to finish the quest himself, but discovered by listening to a pair of Orcs that Frodo was alive but senseless, under a minor influence of venom.

== Name ==
As Tolkien admitted in a letter to his son, Shelob "is of course only 'she + lob'", lob being an archaic English word for spider, influenced by Old English loppe or "spider". The word is not related to "cob" nor "cobweb". (Note: Carpenter 2023, #70 to Christopher Tolkien, May 1944) Old English attercoppe (meaning "spider") is derived from atter meaning "poison" and coppe meaning "head". Tolkien used "attercop" as well as "cob" and "lob" in The Hobbit, where Bilbo Baggins sings songs taunting the giant spiders in Mirkwood: "Attercop, Attercop, Old Tomnoddy" and "Lazy Lob and Crazy Cob". (Note: Tolkien 1937, chapter 8, "Flies and Spiders".)

== Analysis ==
=== Darkness opposed to the light ===
Patrick Grant's Jungian view of Shelob (darkness) as the counterpart of Galadriel (light), fitting into a pattern of opposed archetypes

The critic Joyce Tally Lionarons writes that Tolkien constructs the Elves and the spiders such as Shelob as polar opposites, the Elves good and bright, the spiders evil and dark. Milbank writes more specifically that the ancient Shelob's adversary is another ancient female character, the elf-queen Galadriel. Galadriel both chooses not to be "She-who-must-be-obeyed" by rejecting Frodo's offer of the One Ring, and gives Frodo her light (the Phial of Galadriel) which enables the hobbits to defeat Shelob.

Patrick Grant, a scholar of Renaissance literature, saw Shelob and Galadriel's character pairing, one of several such relationships between characters in the novel, as fitting the opposition of Jungian archetypes. Frodo's anima is the Elf-queen Galadriel, who is opposed by the evil giant female spider Shelob. Frodo's Shadow is the male Hobbit Gollum. All of these, along with oppositions between other characters in the story, create an image of the self.

=== Insatiable evil ===
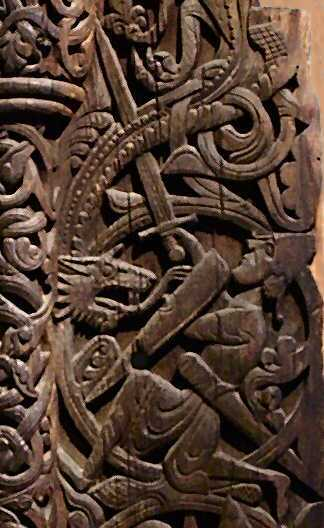
The Hobbits' fight with Shelob derives from multiple myths. Panel in Hylestad Stave Church showing Sigurd's sword penetrating Fafnir.

Jane Chance compares Shelob with the wizard Saruman, stating that both are "monsters" that live in "towers"; they have similarly structured books in Lord of the Rings, one ending in a military attack on Saruman's tower, Orthanc; the other, in the hobbits' venturing into Shelob's lair in Cirith Ungol. On the other hand, she writes, while Saruman's evil is in his mind, Shelob's is in her body.

Chance stresses Shelob's "gluttony", one of the traditional seven deadly sins, consisting of an "insatiable appetite"; her laziness, since the Orcs bring her food; and her "lechery" with many bastard offspring. Chance compares Shelob with the guardian of the gateway to Hell, noting that in John Milton's Paradise Lost, Satan mated with his daughter, Sin, their offspring being Death, constantly lustful for his mother: but Tolkien in one place describes Shelob as Sauron's cat rather than his daughter. The scholar of literature George H. Thomson similarly compares Shelob to Milton's Sin and Death, noting that they "serve neither God nor Satan but look solely to their own interests", as Shelob does; she is "the Death and Chaos that would overcome all".

=== Sexual monster ===
The Tolkien scholar Carol Leibiger writes that Shelob is presented as a disgusting female monster in the story. The Anglican priest and scholar of religion Alison Milbank adds that Shelob is undeniably sexual: "Tolkien offers a most convincing Freudian vagina dentata (toothed vagina) in the ancient and disgustingly gustatory spider Shelob." Milbank states that Shelob symbolises "an ancient maternal power that swallows up masculine identity and autonomy", threatening a "castrating hold [which] is precisely what the sexual fetishist fears, and seeks to control". The Tolkien scholar Jane Chance mentions "Sam's penetration of her belly with his sword", noting that this may be an appropriate and symbolic way of ending her production of "bastards".

The scholar of children's literature Zoë Jaques writes that Shelob is the "embodiment of monstrous maternity"; Sam's battle with Shelob could be interpreted as a "masculine rite of passage" where a smaller, weaker male penetrates and escapes the vast female body and her malicious intent. The Tolkien scholar Brenda Partridge described the hobbits' protracted struggle with Shelob as rife with sexual symbolism. She writes that Tolkien derived Shelob from multiple myths: Sigurd killing Fafnir the dragon; Theseus killing the Minotaur; Arachne and the spider; and Milton's Sin in Paradise Lost. The result is to depict the woman as a threat, with implicit overtones of sexuality.

Brenda Partridge's analysis of Shelob's sexual imagery
Tolkien's image	Implications
Sauron's cat	woman as "graceful, sensual, and aloof"
Spawning broods of monsters	sexual overtones: fertility
Underground lair	womb
Tunnels to lair	"female sexual orifice"
Cobwebs at entrance brushing against Frodo, Sam	pubic hair
Frodo cuts cobwebs ... "a great rent was made ... swayed like a loose veil"	tearing of the hymen
"Soft squelching body"	sexually aroused female genitals
Folds of skin	labia
Swords	phalluses
Sam "held the elven blade point upwards, fending off that ghastly roof; and so Shelob ... thrust herself upon a bitter spike. Deep, deep it pricked"	erection, penetration

Not all commentators have agreed with the sexual associations detected by scholars such as Partridge. The Tolkien scholar Daniel Timmons wrote in Mythlore in 2001: "The obsession of reading the Shelob episode as a sexually violent encounter, rather than as an archetypal struggle between human and monster, likely reveals more about the decadent social attitudes of the critics, rather than those of Tolkien". Timmons accepted the possibility of a "subtext of the fear of female sexual appeal", and agreed that the text might "function in the literary tradition of clashes between man and female monsters, with the attendant sexual innuendos", but called it "disingenuous or perverse" to assert that this was the "main or dominant impression".

== Adaptations ==
The portrayal of Shelob in Peter Jackson's film of The Return of the King is based on the New Zealand tunnel-web spider, a species that Jackson dislikes.

In the 1981 BBC Radio adaption of The Lord of the Rings, Shelob is portrayed by BBC Radiophonic Workshop member Jenny Lee.

In Peter Jackson's film trilogy, Shelob's appearance is delayed until the third movie, The Lord of the Rings: The Return of the King. Her design is based on the New Zealand tunnel-web spider, which Jackson hates.

Shelob is a major character in the video game Middle-earth: Shadow of War, where she serves as both the narrator and an ally to player character Talion. In the game, Shelob shape-shifts to assume the form of an attractive woman. Following criticism of this decision, the creative director Michael de Plater explained that Gollum and Shelob were "the unsung heroes of The Lord of the Rings": Shelob senses Frodo's weakness and makes a pact with Gollum to hasten him to Mount Doom and destroy the ring. De Plater envisioned Shelob as a dark counterpart to Galadriel, noting how both manipulate lesser beings, but that Shelob is more honest.
