= Fleming Rutledge =

American Episcopal priest and author (born 1937)

The Reverend Fleming Rutledge
- Born: 24 November 1937 (age 88); Franklin, Virginia, US
- Education: Sweet Briar College; Union Theological Seminary
- Religion: Christianity (Anglican)
- Church: Episcopal Church
- Ordained: 1975 (deacon); 1977 (priest)
- Writings: The Crucifixion (2015)
- Website: generousorthodoxy.org

Alice Fleming Rutledge (née Parker) (born November 24, 1937), known as Fleming Rutledge, is an American Episcopal priest and author. Ordained to the diaconate in 1975, she was one of the first women to be ordained to the priesthood in the Episcopal Church.

Rutledge is widely recognized in the United States, in Canada, and in the UK as a preacher and lecturer who teaches other preachers. Her particular expertise is the intersection of biblical theology with contemporary culture, current events and politics, literature, music and art. She has often been invited to preach in prominent pulpits. She is a noted Tolkien scholar, bringing a Christian perspective to the study of the writings of J. R. R. Tolkien, who was a devout Roman Catholic.

== Family and education ==
Rutledge was born Alice Fleming Parker on November 24, 1937, in Richmond, Virginia. She graduated from Sweet Briar College in 1959 magna cum laude with highest honors in English and was elected to Phi Beta Kappa. She received her Master of Divinity degree from Union Theological Seminary in New York in 1975. She was awarded an honorary Doctor of Divinity degree from Virginia Theological Seminary in May 1999.

Rutledge was married for 67 years to Reginald E. "Dick" Rutledge (1932−2026), an IBM executive, with whom she had two daughters.

== Ordained ministry ==
In 1975, Rutledge was ordained as a deacon. In January 1977 she became one of the first women to be ordained as a priest in the Episcopal Church.

Rutledge worked at Christ's Church, Rye, New York, creating and leading a Christian program for high school pupils. During the 1980s, she served as an assistant priest, and later as a senior associate priest, at Grace Church in New York City, where she took an active part in renewing the church's mission. The parish became well known for its young congregation and for its evangelistic sermons. Rutledge also was a guest preacher at such prominent ecclesiastical venues as the Washington National Cathedral, the Duke University Chapel, Trinity Church in Boston, and the Memorial Church of Harvard University.

In 1996 she took an interim posting as the rector of St. John's, Salisbury, Connecticut. She has twice been a resident fellow at the Center of Theological Inquiry in Princeton. During the 2008 fall term, she taught preaching at Wycliffe College, part of the University of Toronto. In 2010, she was a visiting scholar at the American Academy in Rome.

== Tolkien scholar ==
Rutledge is in addition a recognized Tolkien scholar, applying her Christian viewpoint to analyzing the thread of Christianity in the fantasy writings of J. R. R. Tolkien, who was a devout Roman Catholic. In the theologian Ralph C. Wood's view, she shows how the biblical story "forms the deep structure of Tolkien's epic", The Lord of the Rings. Wood writes that Rutledge avoids the Manichean trap of supposing that the novel is the tale of good versus evil, something that he states Tolkien "abominated", as the book constantly shows that the "allegedly good" can be dangerously complacent, while the "supposedly evil" can do noble things, and the divide between good and evil runs along "the crooked line cleaving every human and hobbitic, every dwarvish and elvish heart". Wood writes that Rutledge makes it clear that this is "in full accord" with St. Paul and St. Augustine, Luther and Calvin. He finds so much to praise in her book that he "runs the risk of effusiveness". He specially likes her account of the ability of words to heal or to dispirit, as when Galadriel elevates the dwarf Gimli, the dying Thorin blesses Bilbo, and Aragorn acknowledges the good in the dying Boromir on the one hand, or when Wormtongue whispers poisonous thoughts into Theoden's mind, or Sam makes the monster Gollum even worse by always accusing him of deception, on the other.

== Books ==
- The Bible and The New York Times (1998) ISBN 978-0802847010
- Help My Unbelief (2000) ISBN 978-0802877901
- The Undoing of Death (2002) ISBN 978-0802839695
- The Battle for Middle-Earth: Tolkien's Divine Design in "The Lord of the Rings" (2004) ISBN 978-0802824974
- The Seven Last Words from the Cross (2004) ISBN 978-0802827869
- Not Ashamed of the Gospel: Sermons from Paul's Letter to the Romans (2007) ISBN 978-0802827371
- And God Spoke to Abraham: Preaching from the Old Testament (Eerdmans, 2011) ISBN 978-0802866066
- The Crucifixion: Understanding the Death of Jesus Christ (2015) ISBN 978-0802875341
- Advent: The Once and Future Coming of Jesus Christ (2018) ISBN 978-0802876195
- Three Hours: Sermons for Good Friday (2019) ISBN 978-0802877192
- Means of Grace: A Year of Weekly Devotionals (2021) ISBN 978-0802878700
- Epiphany: The Season of Glory (InterVarsity Press, 2023) ISBN 978-1-5140-0038-0
