= History of Arda =

History of J. R. R. Tolkien's Middle-earth

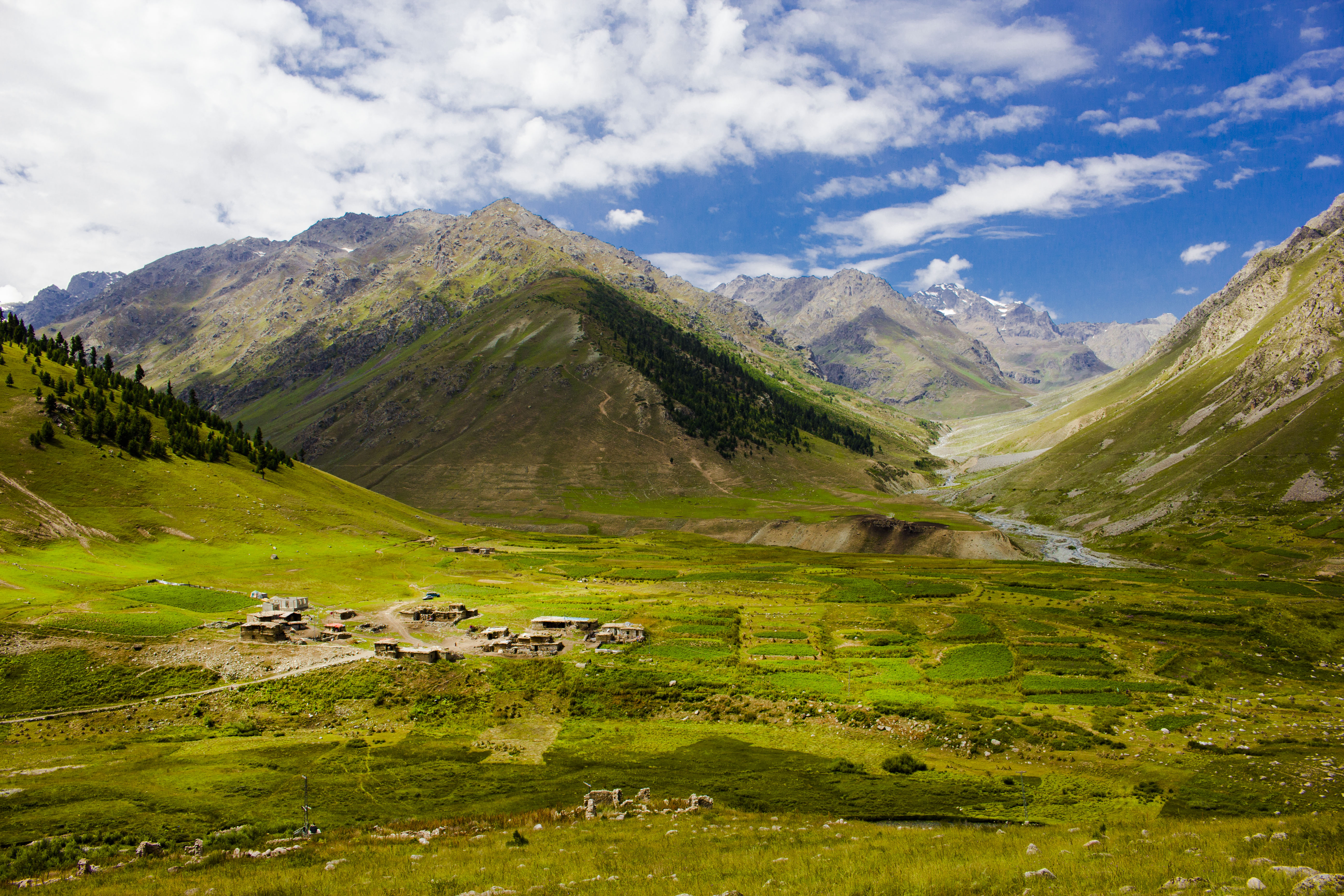
Tolkien meant Arda to be what Paul H. Kocher calls "our own green and solid Earth", seen here in the Baltistan mountains, "at some quite remote epoch in the past". (Note: Carpenter 2023, #211 to Rhona Beare, 14 October 1958, last footnote)

In J. R. R. Tolkien's legendarium, the history of Arda, also called the history of Middle-earth, (Note: Christopher Tolkien called his 12-volume set The History of Middle-earth; scholars such as Brian Rosebury have noted that it makes more sense to call it the history of Arda, as Middle-earth was just one continent, and the early part of the history largely concerns another continent, Aman (Valinor), not to mention the creation and destruction of the island of Númenor.) began when the Ainur entered Arda, following the creation events in the Ainulindalë and long ages of labour throughout Eä, the fictional universe. Time from that point was measured using Valian Years, until the first rising of the Sun, which marked the beginning of the Years of the Sun. A separate, overlapping chronology divides the history into 'Ages of the Children of Ilúvatar'. The first such Age began with the Awakening of the Elves during the Years of the Trees and continued for the first six centuries of the Years of the Sun. All the subsequent Ages took place during the Years of the Sun. Most Middle-earth stories take place in the first three Ages of the Children of Ilúvatar.

Major themes of the history are the divine creation of the world, followed by the splintering of the created light as different wills come into conflict. Scholars have noted the biblical echoes of God, Satan, and the fall of man here, rooted in Tolkien's own Christian faith. Arda is, as critics have noted, "our own green and solid Earth at some quite remote epoch in the past." As such, it has not only an immediate story but a history, and the whole thing is an "imagined prehistory" of the Earth as it is now.

== Music of the Ainur ==
The supreme deity of Tolkien's universe is Eru Ilúvatar. Ilúvatar created spirits named the Ainur from his thoughts, and some were considered brothers or sisters. Ilúvatar made divine music with them. Melkor, then the most powerful of the Ainur, broke the harmony of the music, until Ilúvatar began first a second theme, and then a third theme, which the Ainur could not comprehend since they were not the source of it. The essence of their song symbolized the history of the whole universe and the Children of Ilúvatar that were to dwell in it – Men and Elves. (Note: Tolkien 1977, "Ainulindalë")

Then Ilúvatar created Eä, which means "to be," the universe itself, and formed within it Arda, the Earth, "globed within the void": the world together with the three airs is set apart from Avakúma, the "void" without. The first 15 of the Ainur that descended to Arda, and the most powerful ones, were called Valar; the lesser Ainur were called Maiar.

== Years of Arda ==
=== Valian Years ===
==== Spring of Arda ====
The Spring of Arda, lit by the two great lamps. Based on Karen Wynn Fonstad's Atlas of Middle-earth

When the Valar entered Arda, it was still lifeless and had no distinct geographical features. The initial shape of Arda, chosen by the Valar, was much more symmetrical, including the central continent of Middle-earth. Middle-earth was also originally much larger, and was lit by the misty light that veiled the barren ground. The Valar concentrated this light in two large lamps, called Illuin and Ormal. The Vala Aulë forged two great pillar-like mountains, Helcar in the north and Ringil in the south. Illuin was set upon Helcar and Ormal upon Ringil. In the middle, where the light of the lamps mingled, the Valar dwelt at the island of Almaren upon the Great Lake. (Note: Tolkien 1977, ch. 1 "Of the Beginning of Days")

This period, known as the Spring of Arda, was a time when the Valar had ordered the World as they wished and rested upon Almaren, and Melkor lurked beyond the Walls of Night. During this time animals first appeared, and forests started to grow. The Spring of Arda was interrupted when Melkor returned to Arda, creating his fortress of Utumno (Udûn) beneath the Iron Mountains in the far north. The period ended when Melkor assaulted and destroyed the Lamps of the Valar. Arda was again darkened, and the fall of the great Lamps spoiled the symmetry of Arda's surface. New continents were created: Aman in the West, Middle-earth proper in the middle, the uninhabited lands (later called the Land of the Sun) in the East. At the site of the northern lamp was later the inland Sea of Helcar, of which Cuiviénen was a bay. At the site of the southern lamp was later the Sea of Ringil. After the destruction of the Two Lamps the Years of the Lamps ended and the Years of the Trees began. A Valian Year was considerably longer than a solar year. (Note: Tolkien 1993, "Myths Transformed", 9 "Aman") (Note: The meaning of "years" in this context is problematic. The Valian years measure the passage of time after the arrival of the Valar in Arda. The Valian years were measured in Valinor after the first sunrise, but Tolkien provided no dates for events in Aman after that point. Valian years are not used for Beleriand and Middle-earth. In the 1930s and 1940s Tolkien used a figure which fluctuated slightly around ten before settling on 9.582 solar years in each Valian year. However, in the 1950s, Tolkien decided to use a much greater value of 144 solar years per Valian year.)

==== Years of the Trees ====
Arda in the Years of the Trees. The Two Trees of Valinor illuminated the Blessed Realm; the rest of Arda was dark at that time. The outlines of the continents are purely schematic.

After the destruction of the Two Lamps and the kingdom of Almaren, the Valar abandoned Middle-earth, moving to the continent of Aman. There they built their Second Kingdom, Valinor. Yavanna made the Two Trees, named Telperion (the silver tree) and Laurelin (the golden tree) in the land of Valinor. The Trees illuminated Valinor, leaving Middle-earth in darkness. The Years of the Trees were contemporary with Middle-earth's Sleep of Yavanna (recalled by Treebeard as the Great Darkness).

The Years of the Trees were divided into two epochs. The first ten ages, the Days of Bliss, saw peace and prosperity in Valinor. The Eagles, the Ents, and the Dwarves were conceived by Manwë, Yavanna, and Aulë respectively, but placed into slumber until the awakening of the Elves. The next ten ages, called the Noontide of the Blessed Realm, saw Varda kindling the stars above Middle-earth. This was the first time after the Spring of Arda that Middle-earth was illuminated. The first Elves awoke in Cuiviénen in the middle of Middle-earth, marking the start of the First Age of the Children of Ilúvatar, and were soon approached by the Enemy Melkor who hoped to enslave them. Learning of this, the Valar and the Maiar came into Middle-earth and, in the War of the Powers (also called the Battle of the Powers), defeated Melkor and brought him captive to Valinor. This began the period of the Peace of Arda. (Note: Tolkien 1977, ch. 3 "Of the Coming of the Elves and the Captivity of Melkor")

After the War of the Powers, Oromë of the Valar summoned the Elves to Aman. Many of the Elves went with Oromë on the Great Journey westwards towards Aman. Along the journey several groups of Elves tarried, notably the Nandor and the Sindar. The three clans that arrived at Aman were the Vanyar, the Noldor, and the Teleri. They made their home in Eldamar. (Note: Tolkien 1977, ch. 5 "Of Eldamar and the Princes of the Eldalië") After Melkor appeared to repent and was released after his servitude of three Ages, he revealed his deception by stirring up rivalry between the Noldorin King Finwë's two sons Fëanor and Fingolfin. With the help of the giant spider Ungoliant, he destroyed the Trees of the Valar. The world was again dark, save for the faint starlight. After destroying the trees, he killed Finwë and stole the Silmarils, three gems crafted by Fëanor that contained light of the Two Trees, fleeing with them to his fortress in the North of Middle Earth. There he forged a black iron crown for himself and set the Silmarils in it. (Note: Tolkien 1977, ch. 7 "Of the Silmarils and the Unrest of the Noldor") (Note: Tolkien 1977, ch. 8 "Of the Darkening of Valinor")

Bitter at the Valar's inactivity, Fëanor and his house left to pursue Melkor, cursing him with the name "Morgoth". (Note: Tolkien 1977, ch. 6 "Of Fëanor and the Unchaining of Melkor") While his brother Finarfin chose to stay in Valinor, a larger host led by Fingolfin followed Fëanor. They reached Alqualondë, the port-city of the Teleri, who forbade them from taking their ships for the journey to Middle-earth. The first Kinslaying thus ensued, and the Noldor that partook were exiled indefinitely. Fëanor and his children in return swore an oath to retake the Silmarils, that the Valar turned to a curse over the house of Fëanor. Fëanor's host sailed on the boats, leaving Fingolfin's host behind – who crossed over to Middle-earth on the Helcaraxë (Grinding Ice) in the far north, losing many. The War of the Great Jewels followed, and lasted until the end of the First Age. Meanwhile, the Valar took the last living fruit of Laurelin and the last living flower of Telperion and used them to create the Moon and Sun, which remained a part of Arda, but were separate from Ambar (the world). The first rising of the sun over Ambar heralded the end of the Years of the Trees, and the start of the Years of the Sun, which last to the present day. (Note: Tolkien 1977, ch. 11 "Of the Sun and Moon and the Hiding of Valinor")

=== Years of the Sun ===
The Years of the Sun were the last of the three great time-periods of Arda. They began with the first sunrise in conjunction with the return of the Noldor to Middle-earth, and last until the present day. (Note: Tolkien 1977, ch. 13 "Of the Return of the Noldor") The Years of the Sun began towards the end of the First Age of the Children of Ilúvatar and continued through the Second, Third, and part of the Fourth in Tolkien's stories. Tolkien estimated that modern times would correspond to the sixth or seventh age.

Tolkien situated the History of Arda as Earth's prehistory.
Age	Duration years	Events
Valian Years (Note: Tolkien states that 1 Valian year is 1000 Valian days of 12 Valian hours. A Valian hour is 7 solar hours, making a Valian year 84,000 solar hours. A solar year is about 8,766 solar hours, so a Valian year is 9.582 solar years. (Note: Tolkien 1993, "The Annals of Aman", section 1, p. 59))
Days before days (Note: Tolkien 1993, "The Annals of Aman", §§ 5-10 "Of the Beginning of Time and its Reckoning")	3,500	First War: Marring of Arda; Melkor flees before Tulkas; End of the Spring of Arda: Melkor destroys the Two Lamps; Arda's symmetry broken Aman and Middle-earth created The Valar move to Valinor
Years of the Trees	1,500	Yavanna creates the Two Trees of Valinor; Varda lights the stars, the Elves awaken, the First Age begins Melkor is defeated and imprisoned Ungoliant destroys the Two Trees; Melkor steals the Silmarils
Years of the Sun
First Age (cont'd)	590	Awakening of Men; War of the Jewels; War of Wrath: Morgoth's defeat in Beleriand; Thangorodrim broken Most of Beleriand drowned
Second Age	3,441	Akallabêth: Sauron's first downfall World made round Númenor drowned Valinor removed from Arda; only Elves can travel the Straight Road
Third Age	3,021	War of the Ring: Final defeat of Sauron; Destruction of the One Ring; Elves depart from Middle-earth
Fourth Age and later	~6,000 (Note: Tolkien estimated that the Fourth Age began approximately 6,000 years ago, and that the 20th century would be in the 6th or 7th Age)	(to present day)

== Ages of the Children of Ilúvatar ==
The First Age of the Children of Ilúvatar (Eruhíni) began during the Years of the Trees when the Elves awoke in Cuiviénen in the middle-east of Middle-earth. This marked the start of the years when the Children of Ilúvatar were active in Middle-earth. (Note: Tolkien 1977, ch. 3 "Of the Coming of the Elves and the Captivity of Melkor")

=== First Age ===
Arda in the First Age. The outlines of the continents are purely schematic.

The First Age of the Children of Ilúvatar, also referred to as the Elder Days in The Lord of the Rings, began during the Years of the Trees when the Elves awoke at Cuiviénen, and hence the events mentioned above under Years of the Trees overlap with the beginning of the First Age.

Having crossed into Middle-earth, Fëanor was soon lost in an attack on Morgoth's Balrogs (Maiar who had betrayed the Valar to come under Morgoth's service during the Days before days) – but his sons survived and founded realms, as did the followers of his half-brother Fingolfin, who reached Beleriand after Fëanor's death. In the Dagor Aglareb ("Glorious Battle"), the armies of the Noldor led by Fingolfin and Maedhros attacked from the east and west, destroying the invading Orcs and laid siege to Morgoth's stronghold Angband. The Noldor for a time maintained the Siege of Angband, resulting in the Long Peace. This Peace lasted hundreds of years, during which time Men arrived over the Blue Mountains. (Note: Tolkien 1977, ch. 17 "Of the Coming of Men into the West") Fingolfin died when Morgoth broke the siege in the Dagor Bragollach ("Battle of Sudden Flame"). (Note: Tolkien 1977, ch. 18 "Of the Ruin of Beleriand and the Fall of Fingolfin") The Elves, Men, and Dwarves were all disastrously defeated in the Nírnaeth Arnoediad ("Battle of Unnumbered Tears"), (Note: Tolkien 1977, ch. 20 "Of the Fifth Battle: Nirnaeth Arnoediad") and one by one, the kingdoms fell, even the hidden ones of Doriath (Note: Tolkien 1977, ch. 22 "Of the Ruin of Doriath") and Gondolin. (Note: Tolkien 1977, ch. 23 "Of Tuor and the Fall of Gondolin")

At the end of the age, all that remained of free Elves and Men in Beleriand was a settlement at the mouth of the River Sirion and another on the Isle of Balar. Eärendil possessed the Silmaril which his wife Elwing's grandparents, Lúthien and Beren, had taken from Morgoth. But Fëanor's sons still maintained that all the Silmarils belonged to them, and so there were two more Kinslayings. (Note: Tolkien 1977, ch. 24 Of the Voyage of Earendil and the War of Wrath) Eärendil and Elwing crossed the Great Sea to beg the Valar for aid against Morgoth. They responded, sending forth a great host. In the War of Wrath, Melkor was utterly defeated. He was expelled into the Void and most of his works were destroyed, bringing the First Age to an end. This came at a terrible cost, however, as most of Beleriand itself was sunk.

=== Second Age ===
The Second Age is characterized by the establishment and flourishing of Númenor, the rise of Sauron in Middle-earth, the creation of the Rings of Power and the Ringwraiths, and the early wars of the Rings between Sauron and the Elves. It ended with Sauron's defeat by the Last Alliance of Elves and Men. (Note: Tolkien 1955, Appendix B: The Tale of Years. "The Second Age") (Note: "The Tale of Years" in Appendix B of The Lord of the Rings outlines the major events of the Second Age, especially as they relate to the Rings of Power and the events and characters of The Lord of the Rings. Appendix A contains genealogies of the royal house of Númenor. Appendix D gives details of the Númenórean calendar, including special intercalation in the years 1000, 2000 and 3000, and notes on how this system of intercalation was disrupted by the designation of S.A. 3442 the first year of the Third Age. "After the Downfall in S.A. 3319, the system was maintained by the exiles, but it was much dislocated by the beginning of the Third Age with a new numeration: S.A. 3442 became T.A. 1. By making T.A. 4 a leap year instead of T.A. 3 (S.A. 3444) 1 more short year of only 365 days was intruded". (Note: Tolkien 1955, Appendix D: "Calendars") In addition, several sections of Unfinished Tales deal extensively with Númenor and several of its kings. (Note: Tolkien 1980, part 2: "The Second Age") At the end of The Silmarillion, "Akallabêth" recounts the fall of Númenor and its kings, and the rise of Gondor and Arnor. (Note: Tolkien 1977, "Akallabêth"))

At the start of the Second Age, the Men who had remained faithful were given the island of Númenor, in the middle of the Great Sea, and there they established a powerful kingdom. The White Tree of Númenor was planted in the King's city of Armenelos; and it was said that while that tree stood in the King's courtyard, the reign of Númenor would endure. The Elves were granted pardon for the sins of Fëanor, and were allowed to return home to the Undying Lands. The Númenóreans became great seafarers, and were learned, wise, and had a lifespan beyond other men. At first, they honored the Ban of the Valar, never sailing into the Undying Lands. They went east to Middle-earth and taught the men living there valuable skills. After a time, they became jealous of the Elves for their immortality. Sauron, the mightiest of Maiar and Morgoth's chief servant, was still active. As Annatar, in his deceptive disguise, he taught the Elves of Eregion the craft of creating Rings of Power. Seven Rings were made for the Dwarves, while Nine were made for Men who later became known as the Ringwraiths. He built a stronghold called Barad-dûr and secretly and deceitfully forged the One Ring in the fires of Mount Doom to control the other rings and their bearers. Celebrimbor, a grandson of Fëanor, forged three mighty rings on his own: Vilya, possessed first by the Elven king Gil-galad, then by Elrond; Nenya, wielded by Galadriel; and Narya, given by Celebrimbor to Círdan, who gave it to Gandalf.

As soon as Sauron put on the One Ring, the Elves realized that they had been betrayed and removed the Three (Sauron eventually obtained the Seven and the Nine. While he was unable to suborn the Dwarf ringbearers, he had more success with the Men who bore the Nine; they became the Nazgûl, the Ringwraiths). Sauron then made war on the elves and nearly destroyed them utterly during the Dark Years, but when it seemed defeat was imminent, the Númenóreans joined the battle and completely crushed the forces of Sauron. Sauron never forgot the ruin brought on his armies by the Númenóreans, and made it his goal to destroy them.

Towards the end of the age, the Númenóreans became increasingly haughty. Now they sought to dominate other men and to establish kingdoms. Centuries after Tar-Minastir's engagement, when Sauron had largely recovered, Ar-Pharazôn, the last and most powerful of the Kings of Númenor, humbled Sauron – his armies deserting in the face of Númenor's might – and brought him to Númenor as a hostage, although this was Sauron's goal. Still beautiful in appearance, Sauron gained Ar-Pharazôn's trust and became high priest in the cult of Melkor, who Sauron deceived them to worship. At this time, the Faithful (who still worshipped the one god, Eru Ilúvatar), were persecuted openly by those called the King's Men, and were sacrificed in the name of Melkor. Eventually, Sauron deceived Ar-Pharazôn to invade Aman, promising him that he would thus obtain immortality, though Sauron knew this was not true. Amandil, chief of the Faithful, sailed westward to warn the Valar. His son Elendil and grandsons Isildur and Anárion prepared to flee eastwards, taking with them a seedling of the White Tree of Númenor before Sauron destroyed it, and the palantíri, gifts of the elves. When the King's forces set foot on Aman, the Valar laid down their guardianship of the world and called on Ilúvatar to intervene.

The Downfall of Númenor and the Changing of the World. The earthly paradise of Valinor is removed from Arda; only the Elves remain able to reach it by sailing the Old Straight Road.

The world was changed into a sphere and the continent of Aman was removed, although the Old Straight Road, a sailing route from Middle-earth to Aman, accessible to the Elves but not to mortals, persisted. Númenor was utterly destroyed, as was the fair body of Sauron; however, his spirit returned to Mordor, where he again took up the One Ring, and gathered his strength once more. Elendil, his sons and the remainder of the Faithful sailed to Middle-earth, where they founded the realms in exile of Gondor and Arnor.

Sauron arose again and challenged them. The Elves allied with Men to form the Last Alliance of Elves and Men. For seven years, the Alliance laid siege to Barad-dûr, until at last Sauron himself entered the field. He slew Elendil, High King of Gondor and Arnor, and Gil-galad, the last High King of the Noldor in Middle-earth. However, Isildur took up the hilt of Narsil, his father's shattered sword, and cut the One Ring from Sauron's hand. Sauron was defeated, but not utterly destroyed. Afterward, Isildur ignored the counsel of Elrond, and rather than destroy the One Ring in the fires of Mount Doom, he kept it as weregild for his dead father.

=== Third Age ===
The Third Age lasted for 3021 years, beginning with the first overthrow of Sauron at the hands of the Last Alliance of Elves and Men following the downfall of Númenor, and ending with the War of the Ring and final defeat of Sauron, the events narrated in The Lord of the Rings. Virtually the entire history of the Third Age takes place in Middle-earth. (Note: Tolkien 1955, Appendix B: The Tale of Years, "The Third Age") The Third Age saw the rise in power of the realms of Arnor and Gondor, and their fall. Arnor was divided into three petty Kingdoms, which fell one by one in the wars with Sauron's vassal kingdom of Angmar, whilst Gondor fell victim to Kin-strife, plague, Wainriders, and Corsairs. In this time, the line of the Kings of Gondor ends, with the House of the Stewards ruling in their stead. Meanwhile, the heirs of Isildur from the fallen kingdom of Arnor wander Middle-earth, aided only by Elrond in Rivendell; but the line of rightful heirs remains unbroken throughout the age.

Early in the Age, the Ring betrayed Isildur by slipping from his finger as he was escaping from an Orc ambush at the Gladden Fields, leading to Isildur being killed by an orc arrow and the Ring being lost in the Anduin River.

This age was characterized by the waning of the Elves. In the beginning of the Third Age, many Elves left for Valinor because they were disturbed by the recent war. However, Elven kingdoms still survived in Lindon, Lothlórien, and Mirkwood. Rivendell also became a prominent haven for the Elves and other races. Throughout the Age, they chose not to mingle much in the matters of other lands, and only came to the aid of other races in time of war. The Elves devoted themselves to artistic pleasures, and tended to the lands which they occupied. The gradual decline of Elven populations occurred throughout the Age as the rise of Sauron came to dominate Middle-earth. By the end of the Third Age, only fragments of the once-grand Elven civilization survived in Middle-earth.

The Wizards arrived around a thousand years after the start of this period to aid the Free Peoples from the possible return of Sauron, with the most important Wizards being Gandalf and Saruman. The One Ring was found by Sméagol but, under the power of the Ring and ignorant of its true nature, he retreated with the Ring to a secret life under the Misty Mountains. Middle-earth's devastating Great Plague originated in its vast eastern region, Rhûn, where it caused considerable suffering. (Note: Tolkien 1955, Appendix A part I(iv), p. 328) By the winter of late T.A. 1635 the Plague spread from Rhûn into Wilderland, on the east of Middle-earth's western lands; in Wilderland it killed more than half the population. (Note: Tolkien 1980, part 3 ch. 2(i) pp. 288–289) In the following year the Great Plague spread into Gondor and then Eriador. In Gondor the Plague caused many deaths, including King Telemnar, his children, and the White Tree; the population of the capital city Osgiliath was decimated, and government of the kingdom was transferred to Minas Tirith. In Eriador, the nascent Hobbit-realm of the Shire suffered "great loss" in what they called the Dark Plague.

The so-called Watchful Peace began in T.A. 2063, when Gandalf went to Dol Guldur and the evil dwelling there (later known to be Sauron) fled to the far east. It lasted until T.A. 2460, when Sauron returned with new strength. During this period Gondor strengthened its borders, keeping a watchful eye on the east, as Minas Morgul was still a threat on their flank and Mordor was still occupied with Orcs. There were minor skirmishes with Umbar. In the north, Arnor was long gone, but the Hobbits of the Shire prospered, getting their first Took Thain, and colonizing Buckland. Driven out of Erebor by the dragon Smaug, the Dwarves of Durin's folk under Thorin I settled in the Grey Mountains, where most of their kin now gathered. Meanwhile, Sauron created a strong alliance between the tribes of Easterlings, so that when he returned he had many Men in his service.

The main events of The Hobbit occur in T.A. 2941. By the time of The Lord of the Rings, Sauron had recovered, and was seeking the One Ring. The events of the ensuing War of the Ring leading to the end of the Third Age is the subject of The Lord of the Rings, and summarized in Of the Rings of Power and the Third Age. After the defeat of Sauron, which happened when the One Ring was destroyed in the fires of Mount Doom, Aragorn takes his place as King of the Reunited Kingdom of Arnor and Gondor, restoring the line of Kings from the Stewards of Gondor. Aragorn marries the daughter of Elrond, Arwen, thus for the last time adding Elvish blood to the royal line. As the age ends, Gandalf, Frodo and Bilbo Baggins, and many of the remaining Elves of Middle-earth sail from the Grey Havens to Aman.

=== Fourth Age ===
With the end of the Third Age began the Dominion of Men. Elves were no longer involved in Human affairs, and most Elves left for Valinor; those that remain behind "fade" and diminish. A similar fate meets the Dwarves: although Erebor becomes an ally of the Reunited Kingdom, there are indications that Khazad-dûm is refounded together with a colony established by Gimli in the White Mountains. Together, they disappear from human history. (Note: Tolkien 1996, "The Making of Appendix A", '(IV) Durin's Folk', p. 278.)

Eldarion, son of Aragorn II Elessar and Arwen Evenstar, became King of the Reunited Kingdom in F.A. 120. Aragorn gave him the tokens of his rule, and then surrendered his life willingly, as his ancestors had done thousands of years before. Arwen left him to rule alone, passing away to the now-empty land of Lórien where she died. (Note: Tolkien 1955, Appendix A: The Tale of Aragorn and Arwen) Upon the death of Aragorn, Legolas departed Middle-earth for Valinor, taking Gimli with him and ending the Fellowship of the Ring in Middle-earth. (Note: Tolkien 1955, Appendix B: "Later events concerning the members of the Fellowship of the Ring")

Tolkien once considered writing a sequel to The Lord of the Rings, called The New Shadow, which would have taken place in Eldarion's reign, and in which Eldarion deals with his people turning to evil practices – in effect, a repetition of the history of Númenor. (Note: Tolkien 1996, "The New Shadow") In a 1972 letter concerning this draft, Tolkien mentioned that Eldarion's reign would have lasted for about 100 years after the death of Aragorn. (Note: Carpenter 2023, #338 to Fr. Douglas Carter, 6 June 1972) (Note: Tolkien wrote "I have written nothing beyond the first few years of the Fourth Age. (Except the beginning of a tale supposed to refer to the end of the reign of Eldarion about 100 years after the death of Aragorn. ...)") His realm was to be "great and long-enduring", but the lifespan of the royal house was not to be restored; it would continue to wane until it was like that of ordinary Men. (Note: Tolkien 1996, "The Heirs of Elendil")

=== Later Ages ===
Later Ages continue up to modern times, the remade Arda being equated with Earth. With the loss of all its peoples except Man, and the reshaping of the continents, all that is left of Middle-earth is a dim memory in folklore, legend, and old words. Tolkien estimated that the Fourth Age began approximately 6,000 years ago, and that we would now be in the 6th or 7th Age.

=== Dagor Dagorath ===
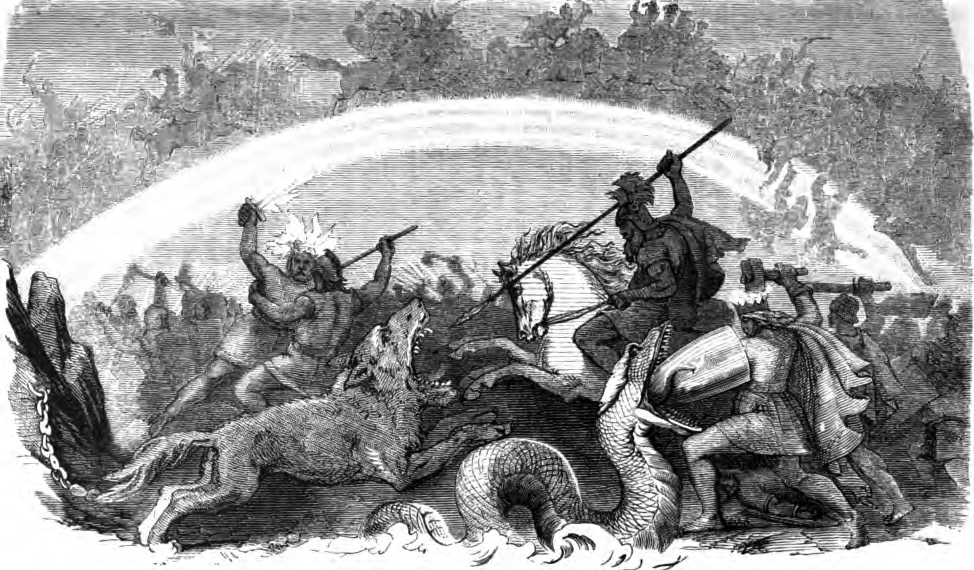
Tolkien likened the Last Battle, Dagor Dagorath, that ends "the world" (Arda) to the Norse Ragnarök. (Note: Carpenter 2023, #131 to Milton Waldman, late 1951) Engraving Battle of the Doomed Gods by Friedrich Wilhelm Heine, 1882

In a letter, Tolkien wrote that "This legendarium [The Silmarillion] ends with a vision of the end of the world [after all the ages have elapsed], its breaking and remaking, and the recovery of the Silmarilli and the 'light before the Sun' – after a final battle [Dagor Dagorath] which owes, I suppose, more to the Norse vision of Ragnarök than to anything else, though it is not much like it." The concept of Dagor Dagorath appears in many of Tolkien's manuscripts that were published by his son Christopher in The History of Middle-earth series, but not in the published Silmarillion, where the eventual fate of Arda is left open-ended in the closing lines of the Quenta Silmarillion. (Note: Tolkien 1986, ch. 3: "Quenta Noldorinwa")

However, Tolkien later came to the conclusion that the Elves themselves had no objective idea of the end of Arda, although they understood with some clarity that it would be achieved through a large-scale catastrophe. The only thing the Elves could count on was estel, which is hope on Eru that his divine plan would ultimately result in salvation and good for the whole world and all the peoples who lived in it. In this context, the legend of the Second Prophecy of Mandos and the specific events of Dagor Dagorath were in fact an ancient Mannish myth of Númenórean origin. (Note: Tolkien 1993, "Athrabeth Finrod ah Andreth")

== Analysis ==
=== Creation and sub-creation ===
Scholars, noting that Tolkien was a devout Catholic, have stated that the Ainulindalë creation myth echoes the Christian account of creation. Brian Rosebury calls its prose "appropriately 'scriptural'". Verlyn Flieger cites Tolkien's poem Mythopoeia ("Creation of Myth"), where he speaks of "man, sub-creator, the refracted light / through whom is splintered from a single White / to many hues, and endlessly combined / in living shapes". She analyses in detail the successive splintering of the original created light, via the Two Lamps, the Two Trees, and the Silmarils, as the wills of different beings conflict. She states that for Tolkien, this creative light was equated with the Christian Logos, the Divine Word. Jane Chance remarks on the biblical theme of the conflict between the creator Eru Ilúvatar and the fallen Vala Melkor/Morgoth, mirroring that between God and Satan. Similarly, she notes, the struggles of Elves and Men corrupted by Morgoth and his spiritual descendant Sauron echo those of Adam and Eve tempted by Satan in the Garden of Eden, and the fall of man.

Flieger has observed that the splintering of the created light is a process of decline and fall from a once-perfect state. She identifies a theory of decline that influenced Tolkien, namely Owen Barfield's theory of language in his 1928 book Poetic Diction. The central idea was that there was once a unified set of meanings in an ancient language, and that modern languages are derived from this by fragmentation of meaning. Tolkien took this to imply the separation of peoples, in particular the complicated and repeated sundering of the Elves.

=== A dark mythology ===
Scholars including Flieger have noted that if Tolkien intended to create a mythology for England, in the history of Arda as told in The Silmarillion he had made it very dark. John Garth has identified his experiences in the First World War as formative; he began his Middle-earth writings at that time. Flieger suggests that Middle-earth arose not only from Tolkien's own wartime experience, but out of that of his dead schoolfriends Geoffrey Bache Smith and Rob Gilson. Janet Brennan Croft writes that Tolkien's first prose work after returning from the war was The Fall of Gondolin, and that it is "full of extended and terrifying scenes of battle"; she notes that the streetfighting is described over 16 pages.

The Tolkien scholar Norbert Schürer notes the 2022 book The Fall of Númenor and the Amazon television series The Rings of Power, both about the Second Age, and asks what the period signifies for the legendarium as a whole. In his view, the period is problematic, having only one finished tale, the Atlantis-style Akallabêth. He proposes that Tolkien wanted to link the First Age (most of the content of the 1977 The Silmarillion) with the Third Age (of The Lord of the Rings) by joining them together with a central period. In his view, this could not work for Tolkien, because the Second Age centred on "the failure, decline, and corruption" at the core of human life; Schürer argues that this was unacceptable to Tolkien as a Christian.

=== Greek mythology ===
Among the many influences that scholars have proposed as possibly important on the history of Arda is Greek mythology. The disappearance of the island of Númenor recalls Atlantis. (Note: Carpenter 2023, #154 to Naomi Mitchison, September 1954) (Note: Carpenter 2023, #227 to Mrs Drijver, January 1961) The Valar borrow many attributes from the Olympian gods. Like the Olympians, the Valar live in the world, but on a high mountain, separated from mortals; Ulmo, Lord of the Waters, owes much to Poseidon, and Manwë, the Lord of the Air and King of the Valar, to Zeus. Tolkien compared Beren and Lúthien with Orpheus and Eurydice, but with the gender roles reversed. He mentioned Oedipus, too, in connection with Túrin in the Children of Húrin. Flieger has compared Fëanor with Prometheus: they are associated with fire, and are punished for rebelling against the gods' decrees.

=== "Imagined prehistory" ===
Tolkien imagined Arda as the Earth in the distant past. With the loss of all its peoples except Man, and the reshaping of the continents, all that is left of Middle-earth is a dim memory in folklore, legend, and old words.

Arda is summed up by the Tolkien scholar Paul H. Kocher as "our own green and solid Earth at some quite remote epoch in the past." Kocher notes Tolkien's statement in the Prologue, equating Middle-earth with the actual Earth, separated by a long period of time:

Those days, the Third Age of Middle-earth, are now long past, and the shape of all lands has been changed; but the regions in which Hobbits then lived were doubtless the same as those in which they still linger: the North-West of the Old World, east of the Sea. Of their original home the Hobbits in Bilbo’s time preserved no knowledge. (Note: Tolkien 1954a "Prologue")

In a letter written in 1958, Tolkien states that while the time is invented, the place, planet Earth, is not (italics in original):

I have, I suppose, constructed an imaginary time, but kept my feet on my own mother-earth for place. I prefer that to the contemporary mode of seeking remote globes in 'space'... Many reviewers seem to assume that Middle-earth is another planet!

In the same letter, he places the beginning of the Fourth Age some 6,000 years in the past:

I imagine the gap [since the War of the Ring and the end of the Third Age] to be about 6000 years; that is we are now at the end of the Fifth Age if the Ages were of about the same length as Second Age and Third Age. But they have, I think, quickened; and I imagine we are actually at the end of the Sixth Age, or in the Seventh.

The Tolkien scholar Richard C. West writes that one of the "very final passages" of the internal chronology of Lord of the Rings, The Tale of Aragorn and Arwen, ends not just with Arwen's death, but the statement that her grave will remain on the hill of Cerin Amroth in what was Lothlorien "until the world is changed, and all the days of her life are utterly forgotten by men that come after ... and with the passing of [Arwen] Evenstar no more is said in this book of the days of old." West observes that this points up a "highly unusual" aspect of Tolkien's legendarium among modern fantasy: it is set "in the real world but in an imagined prehistory." As a result, West explains, Tolkien can build what he likes in that distant past, elves and wizards and hobbits and all the rest, provided that he tears it all down again, so that the modern world can emerge from the wreckage, with nothing but "a word or two, a few vague legends and confused traditions..." to show for it.

West praises and quotes Kocher on Tolkien's imagined prehistory and the implied process of fading to lead from fantasy to the modern world:

At the end of his epic Tolkien inserts ... some forebodings of [Middle-earth's] future which will make Earth what it is today ... he shows the initial steps in a long process of retreat or disappearance by which all other intelligent species, which will leave man effectually alone on earth... Ents may still be there in our forests, but what forests have we left? The process of extermination is already well under way in the Third Age, and ... Tolkien bitterly deplores its climax today."

The Tolkien scholar Stuart D. Lee and the medievalist Elizabeth Solopova make "an attempt at a summary", which runs as follows. The Silmarillion describes events "presented as factual" but taking place before Earth's actual recorded history. What happened is processed through the generations as folk-myths and legends, especially among the (Old) English. Before the Fall of Númenor, the world was flat. In the Fall, it became round; further geological events reshaped the continents into the Earth as it now is. All the same, the old tales survive here and there, resulting in mentions of Dwarves and Elves in real Medieval literature. Thus, Tolkien's imagined mythology "is an attempt to reconstruct our pre-history." Lee and Solopova comment that "Only by understanding this can we fully realize the true scale of his project and comprehend how enormous his achievement was."

The poet W. H. Auden wrote in The New York Times that "no previous writer has, to my knowledge, created an imaginary world and a feigned history in such detail. By the time the reader has finished the trilogy, including the appendices to this last volume, he knows as much about Tolkien's Middle Earth, its landscape, its fauna and flora, its peoples, their languages, their history, their cultural habits, as, outside his special field, he knows about the actual world." (Note: Auden only had The Lord of the Rings to go on in 1956, but he commented that "From the appendices readers will get tantalizing glimpses of the First and Second Ages" and hoped that as the "legend of these" had already been written, readers would not have to wait too long for them.) The scholar Margaret Hiley comments that Auden's "feigned history" echoes Tolkien's own statement in the foreword to the second edition of Lord of the Rings that he much preferred history, true or feigned, to allegory; and that Middle-earth's history is told in The Silmarillion.
