= Sauron =

Primary antagonist in Tolkien's "The Lord of the Rings"

- Middle-earth character
- J. R. R. Tolkien's unfinished watercolour illustration of Sauron (Note: Hammond & Scull 1995, pp. 152ff)

In-universe information
- Aliases: Mairon (originally); Annatar; The Dark Lord; The Necromancer; Lord of the Rings
- Race: Maia
- Book(s): The Hobbit; The Lord of the Rings; The Silmarillion; Unfinished Tales; The History of Middle-earth series; Beren and Lúthien

Sauron (/ˈsaʊrɒn/) (Note: Tolkien 1977, "Note on Pronunciation": "The first syllable of Sauron is like English sour, not sore") is the title character and the main antagonist of J. R. R. Tolkien's The Lord of the Rings, where he rules the land of Mordor. He seeks to conquer Middle-earth using the power of the One Ring, which he has lost and attempts to recapture. In the same work, he is identified as the "Necromancer" of Tolkien's earlier novel The Hobbit. The Silmarillion describes him as the chief lieutenant of the first Dark Lord, Morgoth. Originally an angelic being, Sauron followed Morgoth in his rebellion against Eru Iluvatar, the supreme being in Tolkien's mythology. Sauron appears most often as "the Eye", as if disembodied.

Tolkien, while denying that absolute evil could exist, stated that Sauron came as near to a wholly evil will as was possible. Commentators have compared Sauron to the title character of Bram Stoker's 1897 novel Dracula, and to Balor of the Evil Eye in Irish mythology. Sauron is briefly seen in a humanoid form in Peter Jackson's film trilogy, which otherwise shows him as a disembodied, flaming Eye.

== Fictional history ==
=== Before the world's creation ===
The supreme being Eru Ilúvatar began the creation with good, (Note: Tolkien 1954a, book 2, ch. 2 "The Council of Elrond") immortal spirits, the powerful Valar and the lesser Maiar. Sauron was one of the Maiar. (Note: Carpenter 2023, #156 to Robert Murray SJ, 4 November 1954) (Note: Carpenter 2023, #183, notes on W. H. Auden's review of The Return of the King) The Vala Melkor rebelled against Eru, (Note: The story of the Song of Creation was presented by the Valar "according to our modes of thought and our imagination of the visible world, in symbols that were intelligible to us". Tolkien 1994, p. 407) (Note: Tolkien 1977, "Ainulindalë") starting evils (Note: Tolkien 1996, p. 413) that Sauron continued. (Note: Tolkien 1993, pp. 395–398) Sauron perceived Eru directly; he was "far higher" than the Maiar who later came to Middle-earth as Wizards.

=== First Age ===
Sauron served Aulë, the smith of the Valar, acquiring knowledge. (Note: Tolkien 1977, "Valaquenta") (Note: The name Sauron, meaning "The Abhorred" is used throughout The Lord of the Rings and The Silmarillion as his common name. (Note: Tolkien 1977, "Index: Sauron")) Sauron, hating disorder, was drawn to Melkor's power. (Note: Tolkien 1977, "Of the Rings of Power and the Third Age") He became a spy for Melkor on the isle of Almaren, the Valar's home, which Melkor soon destroyed; the Valar moved to Valinor, not perceiving Sauron's treachery. (Note: Carpenter 2023, #131 to Milton Waldman, late 1951) Sauron followed Melkor to Middle-earth, (Note: Tolkien 1955, p. 239) joining the Valar's enemy.

Sauron helped Melkor in every kind of deceit. (Note: Tolkien 1993, pp. 420–421) By the time Elves awoke, Sauron was Melkor's lieutenant with command over the stronghold of Angband. The Valar made war on and captured Melkor; Sauron escaped. (Note: Tolkien 1977, ch. 3 "Of the Coming of the Elves and the Captivity of Melkor") He repaired Angband, and bred an army of Orcs. Melkor, now called Morgoth, murdered Finwë, King of the Noldor, and escaped to Middle-earth with the Silmarils, pursued by the Noldor. (Note: This conflicts with earlier versions of the story, in which Orcs existed before the wakening of the Elves, as in The Fall of Gondolin.) Sauron made war on the Elves, conquering their fortress on the isle of Tol Sirion. The elf Lúthien came there to save her lover, the imprisoned Beren, with Huan the Wolfhound. Sauron, as a werewolf, battled Huan, who took him by the throat; Sauron was defeated and fled, taking the form of a huge vampire bat. Lúthien destroyed the tower and rescued Beren. Later, the half-elf Eärendil sailed to Valinor to ask the Valar to fight Morgoth. They did so in the War of Wrath, where Morgoth was defeated and cast into the Outer Void; but Sauron escaped. (Note: Tolkien 1987, p. 333)

=== Second Age ===
Sauron appeared in the Second Age as the fair-seeming Annatar. Illustration by Alan Lee

In the Second Age, Sauron reappeared, intent on taking over Middle-earth. (Note: Carpenter 2023, #153 to Peter Hastings (draft)) To seduce the Elves into his service, Sauron assumed a fair appearance as Annatar, "Lord of Gifts", and befriended Celebrimbor's Elven-smiths. He taught them arts and magic, helping them to forge the Rings of Power, but then secretly forged the One Ring to rule all the others. The Elves detected him when he put on the Ring, and removed their Rings. Enraged, Sauron made war, killed Celebrimbor, and seized the Seven and the Nine Rings of Power. The Three were hidden by the Elves Gil-galad, Círdan, and Galadriel; Sauron attacked them. The Elves were saved by an army from Númenor, defeating Sauron. Sauron fortified Mordor and completed the Dark Tower, Barad-dûr. He distributed the Seven and the Nine Rings to lords of Dwarves and Men. Dwarves did not submit, but he enslaved nine Men as the feared Nazgûl. Orcs, Trolls, Easterlings and men of Harad became his servants.

Late in the Second Age, the men of Númenor sought to colonise Middle-earth. Led by Ar-Pharazôn, their army sailed to Middle-earth to battle Sauron. Dismayed, Sauron surrendered, hoping to corrupt Númenor from within. (Note: Carpenter 2023, #211 to Rhona Beare, 14 October 1958) Using the One Ring, Sauron soon undermined their religion and deceived them into worshipping Melkor with human sacrifice. Sauron later deceived Ar-Pharazôn into attacking Aman by sea by pretending he could steal immortality from the Valar. The Valar appealed to Eru, who destroyed Númenor. Sauron's body was destroyed, and he lost the ability to appear beautiful.

Led by Elendil, nine ships escaped to Middle-earth from the Downfall of Númenór. There, the Númenóreans founded the kingdoms of Gondor and Arnor. Sauron returned to Mordor, took on a new physical form, and made war on these Exiles. (Note: Tolkien 1955, Appendices) He captured the fortress of Minas Ithil, and Elendil's son Isildur escaped down the Anduin River. Elendil's other son, Anárion, defended Osgiliath, the capital of Gondor, and drove Sauron's forces back to the mountains. Elendil, Isildur and Anárion formed the Last Alliance with the Elves and defeated Sauron at Dagorlad. They invaded Mordor and besieged Barad-dûr for seven years. Finally, Sauron came out to fight face-to-face, killing Elendil and Gil-galad; Elendil's sword Narsil broke beneath him. Isildur took up the hilt-shard and cut the One Ring from Sauron's hand, vanquishing Sauron. Isildur refused to destroy the Ring by casting it into Mount Doom; instead, he kept it for his own.

=== Third Age ===
The Ring was lost in the River Anduin when Isildur was ambushed and killed by Orcs at the Gladden Fields. Sauron spent a thousand years as a shapeless evil. (Note: Tolkien 1980, "The disaster of the Gladden Fields") He reembodied as the Necromancer, hiding at Dol Guldur in Mirkwood. (Note: Tolkien 1955, Appendix B, "The Tale of Years", "The Third Age") The White Council discovered that Sauron had taken up residence in Mirkwood and drove him away in 2941. Sauron returned to Mordor, openly declared himself, and began to rebuild the fortress of Barad-dûr. (Note: Tolkien 1955, Appendix B, "The Tale of Years (Chronology of the Westlands)": "2951 Sauron declares himself openly and gathers power in Mordor. He begins the rebuilding of Barad-dûr".)

Sauron captured and tortured the monster Gollum. Gollum, who had previously possessed the Ring, informed Sauron that the hobbit Bilbo Baggins had taken the Ring. (Note: Tolkien 1954a, book 1, ch. 2 "The Shadow of the Past") Bilbo gifted the Ring to his cousin, Frodo Baggins. In 3018, the wizard Gandalf identified it as the One Ring. Sauron was urgently seeking the Ring, which he needed to take control of Middle-earth. Sauron had "let a great part of his own former power" pass into the Ring. That year, Sauron sent the Nazgûl to find "Baggins" and seize the Ring, but Frodo and his companions escaped them and reached Rivendell. There, Elrond convened a council, which determined that Frodo should take the Ring to Mount Doom and destroy it. Sauron did not anticipate this course of action. He expected that someone would use the Ring to attempt to overthrow him and take his place. To prevent this outcome, he prepared to make war on the land of Gondor. (Note: Tolkien 1954, book 3, ch. 5 "The White Rider")

After Aragorn, Isildur's descendant and heir to the throne of Gondor, used the palantír of Orthanc to show himself to Sauron, (Note: Tolkien 1954, book 5, ch. 2 "The Passing of the Grey Company") Sauron was troubled and attacked Minas Tirith prematurely. His attack failed in the Battle of the Pelennor Fields. (Note: Tolkien 1955, book 5, ch. 9 "The Last Debate")

The nations of Gondor and Rohan launched an attack on Mordor's Black Gate. (Note: Tolkien 1955, book 5, ch. 10 "The Black Gate Opens") Meanwhile, Frodo and his servant, Samwise Gamgee, had secretly entered Mordor through the passage of Cirith Ungol. (Note: Tolkien 1955, book 6, ch. 1 "The Tower of Cirith Ungol") Frodo and Samwise reached Mount Doom. Under the Ring's evil influence, Frodo claimed the Ring for himself; upon putting it on he revealed its location to Sauron. Sauron then realized for the first time that his enemies purposed to destroy the Ring. Before Sauron could intervene, Gollum seized the Ring and fell into the Cracks of Doom, destroying it and himself. (Note: Tolkien 1955, book 6, ch. 3 "Mount Doom") Utterly defeated, Sauron was reduced to a spirit, never again able to recover form or power. (Note: Tolkien 1955, book 6, ch. 4 "The Field of Cormallen") (Note: Tolkien 1955, Appendices)

== Appearance ==
=== Physical body ===
Tolkien never described Sauron's appearance in detail, though he painted a watercolour illustration of him. Sarah Crown, in The Guardian, wrote that "we're never ushered into his presence; we don't hear him speak. All we see is his influence". She called it "a bold move, to leave the book's central evil so undefined – an edgeless darkness given shape only through the actions of its subordinates", with the result that he becomes "truly unforgettable ... vaster, bolder and more terrifying through his absence than he could ever have been through his presence".

Sauron was initially able to change his appearance at will; however, when he became Morgoth's servant, he took a sinister shape. In the First Age, the outlaw Gorlim was ensnared and brought into "the dreadful presence of Sauron", who had daunting eyes. (Note: Tolkien 1977, ch. 19, "Of Beren and Luthien") In the battle with Huan, the hound of Valinor, Sauron took the form of a werewolf. Then he assumed a serpent-like form, and finally changed back "from monster to his own accustomed [human-like] form". (Note: Tolkien 1977, ch. 20 "Of the Fifth Battle: Nirnaeth Arnoediad") He took on a beautiful appearance at the end of the First Age to charm Eönwë, near the beginning of the Second Age when appearing as Annatar to the Elves, and again near the end of the Second Age to corrupt the men of Númenor. He appeared then "as a man, or one in man's shape, but greater than any even of the race of Númenor in stature ... And it seemed to men that Sauron was great, though they feared the light of his eyes. To many he appeared fair, to others terrible; but to some evil." After the destruction of his fair form in the fall of Númenor, Sauron always took the shape of a terrible dark lord. (Note: Carpenter 2023, #246 to Eileen Elgar, September 1963) His first incarnation after the Downfall of Númenor was hideous, "an image of malice and hatred made visible". (Note: Tolkien 1977, Akallabêth) Isildur recorded that Sauron's hand "was black, and yet burned like fire".

=== Eye of Sauron ===
A flag displaying the Red Eye of Sauron, based on a design by Tolkien that was used on the cover of the first edition of The Fellowship of the Ring in 1954

Throughout The Lord of the Rings, "the Eye" (known by other names, including the Red Eye, the Evil Eye, the Lidless Eye, the Great Eye) is the image most often associated with Sauron. Sauron's Orcs bore the symbol of the Eye on their helmets and shields, and referred to him as the "Eye" because he did not allow his name to be written or spoken, according to Aragorn. (Note: Tolkien 1954, book 3, ch. 5 "The Departure of Boromir") (Note: A notable exception was Sauron's emissary, the Mouth of Sauron.) The Lord of the Nazgûl threatened Éowyn with torture before the "Lidless Eye" at the Battle of the Pelennor Fields. (Note: Tolkien 1954, book 5, ch. 6 "The Battle of the Pelennor Fields") Frodo had a vision of the Eye in the Mirror of Galadriel: (Note: Tolkien 1954a, book 2, ch. 7 "The Mirror of Galadriel")

The Eye was rimmed with fire, but was itself glazed, yellow as a cat's, watchful and intent, and the black slit of its pupil opened on a pit, a window into nothing.

Later, Tolkien writes as if Frodo and Sam really glimpse the Eye directly. The mists surrounding Barad-dûr are briefly withdrawn, and:

one moment only it stared out ... as from some great window immeasurably high there stabbed northward a flame of red, the flicker of a piercing Eye ... The Eye was not turned on them, it was gazing north ... but Frodo at that dreadful glimpse fell as one stricken mortally. (Note: Tolkien 1955, book 6, ch. 3 "Mount Doom")

This raises the question of whether an "Eye" was Sauron's actual manifestation, or whether he had a body beyond the Eye. (Note: Tolkien 1992, part 1, ch. 4 "Mount Doom") Gollum (who was tortured by Sauron in person) tells Frodo that Sauron has, at least, a "Black Hand" with four fingers. (Note: Tolkien 1954, book 4, ch. 3 "The Black Gate is Closed") The missing finger was cut off when Isildur took the Ring, and the finger was still missing when Sauron reappeared centuries later. Tolkien writes in The Silmarillion that "the Eye of Sauron the Terrible few could endure" even before his body was lost in the War of the Last Alliance. In the draft text of the climactic moments of The Lord of the Rings, "the Eye" stands for Sauron's very person, with emotions and thoughts:

The Dark Lord was suddenly aware of him [Frodo], the Eye piercing all shadows ... Its wrath blazed like a sudden flame and its fear was like a great black smoke, for it knew its deadly peril, the thread upon which hung its doom ... [I]ts thought was now bent with all its overwhelming force upon the Mountain..."

Christopher Tolkien comments: "The passage is notable in showing the degree to which my father had come to identify the Eye of Barad-dûr with the mind and will of Sauron, so that he could speak of 'its wrath, its fear, its thought'. In the second text ... he shifted from 'its' to 'his' as he wrote out the passage anew."

== Concept and creation ==
Since the earliest versions of the Silmarillion legendarium, as detailed in the History of Middle-earth series, Sauron underwent many changes. The prototype or precursor Sauron-figure was a giant monstrous cat, the Prince of Cats. Called Tevildo, Tifil and Tiberth among other names, this character played the role later taken by Sauron in the earliest version of the story of Beren and Tinúviel in The Book of Lost Tales in 1917. (Note: Tolkien 1984b, Part Two, "The Tale of Tinúviel") The Prince of Cats was later replaced by Thû, the Necromancer. The name was then changed to Gorthû, Sûr, and finally to Sauron. Gorthû, in the form Gorthaur, remained in The Silmarillion; both Thû and Sauron name the character in the 1925 Lay of Leithian. (Note: Tolkien 1984, "The Lay of Leithian")

The story of Beren and Lúthien also features the heroic hound Huan and involved the subtext of cats versus dogs in its earliest form. Later the cats were changed to wolves or werewolves, with Sauron becoming the Lord of Werewolves. (Note: Tolkien 1977, ch. 18 "Of the Ruin of Beleriand and the Fall of Fingolfin")

Before the 1977 publication of The Silmarillion, Sauron's origins and true identity were unclear to those without access to Tolkien's notes. In 1968, the poet W. H. Auden conjectured that Sauron might have been one of the Valar.

== Analysis ==
Sauron is the title character (Note: This is made clear in the chapter "The Council of Elrond", where Glorfindel states that "soon or late the Lord of the Rings would learn of its hiding place and would bend all his power towards it".) and the main antagonist in The Lord of the Rings.

=== Embodiment of evil ===
Sauron, like everything else, is created good (the Augustinian view), and seems to embody evil which is as powerful as good (the Manichaean view), but actually embodies evil which is the absence of good (the Boethian view).

Tolkien described the "rebellion and evil of Morgoth and his satellite Sauron" as Satanic. While denying that absolute evil could exist, Tolkien stated that Sauron came as near to a wholly evil will as was possible. Tolkien added that Sauron "went further than human tyrants in pride and the lust for domination" since he was an immortal (angelic) spirit. In Tolkien's words, "He began as Morgoth's servant, became his representative in the Second Age, and at the end of the Third Age actually claimed to be 'Morgoth returned'". (Note: Carpenter 2023, #183 notes on W. H. Auden's review of The Return of the King)

Tom Shippey writes that Tolkien's depiction of Sauron embodies an ancient debate within Christianity on the nature of evil. Shippey notes Elrond's statement that "nothing is evil in the beginning. Even [the Dark Lord] Sauron was not so". He takes this to mean that Sauron was created good, and became evil by moving away from the good. The first part of Elrond's statement is taken by scholars to imply an Augustinian universe, created good. The second part of Elrond's statement, Shippey writes, is the Boethian view, where evil is the absence of good. Shippey adds that Tolkien sets this alongside the Manichaean view that good and evil are equally powerful, and battle it out in the world. Tolkien's personal war experience was Manichean: evil seemed at least as powerful as good, and could easily have been victorious, a strand which (Shippey writes) can be seen in Middle-earth.

=== Classically reptilian ===
The classicist J. K. Newman comments that "Sauron's Greek name" makes him "the Lizard", from Ancient Greek σαῦρος (sauros) 'lizard or reptile', and that in turn places Frodo (whose quest destroys Sauron) as "a version of Praxiteles' Apollo Sauroktonos", Apollo the Lizard-killer.

=== Destructive Dracula-figure ===
Gwenyth Hood, writing in Mythlore, compares Sauron to Count Dracula from Bram Stoker's 1897 novel Dracula. In her view, both of these monstrous antagonists seek to destroy, are linked to powers of darkness, are parasitical on created life, and are undead. Both control others psychologically and have "hypnotic eyes". Control by either of them represents "high spiritual terror" as it is a sort of "damnation-on-earth".

=== Celtic Balor of the Evil Eye ===
Edward Lense, also writing in Mythlore, identifies a figure from Celtic mythology, Balor of the Evil Eye, as a possible source for the Eye of Sauron. Balor's evil eye, in the middle of his forehead, was able to overcome a whole army. He was a leader of the supernatural Fomorians. Lense further compares Mordor to "a Celtic hell", just as the Undying Lands of Aman resemble the Celtic Earthly Paradise of Tír na nÓg in the furthest (Atlantic) West; and Balor "ruled the dead from a tower of glass".

=== Antagonist ===
The Tolkien scholar Verlyn Flieger writes that if there was an opposite to Sauron in The Lord of the Rings, it would not be Aragorn, his political opponent, nor Gandalf, his spiritual enemy, but Tom Bombadil, the earthly Master who is entirely free of the desire to dominate and hence cannot be dominated.

Sauron's opposite, as analysed by Verlyn Flieger
	Sauron	Tom Bombadil
Role	Antagonist	Earthly counterpart
Title	Dark Lord	"Master"
Purpose	Domination of whole of Middle-earth	Care for The Old Forest "No hidden agenda, no covert desire or plan of operation"
Effect of the One Ring	"Power over other wills"	No effect on him "as he is not human", nor does it make others invisible to him, or him to others
How he sees the Ring	Means of domination	Looks right through it, his "blue eye peering through the circle of the Ring"

== Adaptations ==
Sauron, portrayed by Sala Baker, in Peter Jackson's The Fellowship of the Ring

In early film versions of The Lord of the Rings, Sauron has been left off-screen as "an invisible and unvisualizable antagonist" as in Ralph Bakshi's 1978 animated version, or as a disembodied Eye, as in Rankin/Bass's 1980 animated adaptation of The Return of the King.

In the 1981 BBC Radio adaptation of The Lord of the Rings, Sauron does not appear in person, but his wishes, commands and intent are spoken by intermediaries such as The Mouth of Sauron, played by John Rye.

In the 2001–2003 film trilogy directed by Peter Jackson, Sauron is voiced by Alan Howard. Portrayed by Sala Baker, Sauron is briefly shown as a large humanoid figure clad in spiky black armour, He appears only as the disembodied Eye throughout the rest of the storyline. In earlier versions of Jackson's script, Sauron does battle with Aragorn, as shown in the extended DVD version of The Lord of the Rings: The Return of the King. The scene was removed as too large a departure from Tolkien's text and was replaced with Aragorn fighting a troll. Sauron appears as the Necromancer in Jackson's The Hobbit film adaptations, where he is voiced by Benedict Cumberbatch.

Sauron appears in the form of his eye in the 2017 The Lego Batman Movie voiced by Jemaine Clement. He is one of the many classic villains the Joker frees from the Phantom Zone to run amok in Gotham City. He features, too, in the merchandise of the Jackson films, including computer and video games. These include The Lord of the Rings: The Battle for Middle-earth II (where he was voiced by Fred Tatasciore), The Lord of the Rings: Tactics, and The Lord of the Rings: The Third Age. In the Lord of the Rings Online game, he is featured as an enemy.

Sauron's rise to power in the Second Age is portrayed in the Amazon prequel series The Lord of the Rings: The Rings of Power. He first appears disguised as the non-canonical human character Halbrand, and then in the second season as Annatar (a canonical alias of Sauron), both played by Charlie Vickers. The Halbrand persona was conceived to make the audience share the feeling of being deceived by Sauron, and to ensure he would not overshadow other characters. Afterwards, he would be allowed to function like other classic TV villains (such as Walter White or Tony Soprano), or Lucifer in John Milton's Paradise Lost. Vickers said he was unaware of his character's true identity until filming the third episode. He admitted he began to suspect when lines from Milton's Paradise Lost, a narrative poem about the biblical story of the fall of man, were used during an audition. Jack Lowden portrays the character's First Age and early Second Age form in flashback in the second season premiere. The depiction of evil in Arda as embodied in Sauron shifts both in Tolkien's writings and in the Amazon series. The prequel adopts Tolkien's use of both Augustinian and Manichean attitudes to evil.

== In culture ==
The Eye of Sauron is mentioned in The Stand, a 1978 post-apocalyptic novel written by Stephen King. The villain Randall Flagg possesses an astral body in the form of an "Eye" akin to the Lidless Eye. The novel itself was conceived by King as a "fantasy epic like The Lord of the Rings, only with an American setting". The idea of Sauron as a sleepless eye that watches and seeks the protagonists also influenced King's epic fantasy series The Dark Tower; its villain, the Crimson King, is a similarly disembodied evil presence whose icon is also an eye.

In the Marvel Comics Universe, the supervillain Sauron, an enemy of the X-Men created in 1969, names himself after the Tolkien character. In the comic series Fables, by Bill Willingham, begun in 2002, one character is called "The Adversary", an ambiguous figure of immense evil and power believed to be responsible for much of the misfortune in the Fables' overall history. Willingham has stated "The Adversary", in name and in character, was inspired by Sauron.
