= Eärendil and Elwing =

Characters in J. R. R. Tolkien's The Silmarillion

Eärendil
- Tolkien character

In-universe information
- Aliases: Eärendil the Mariner (originally "Eärendel")
- Race: Half-elven
- Book(s): The Silmarillion (1977); Unfinished Tales (1980)

Elwing
- Tolkien character

In-universe information
- Alias: Elwing the White
- Race: Half-elven
- Book(s): The Silmarillion

Eärendil (Quenya pronunciation: [ɛ.aˈrɛn.dil]) the Mariner and his wife Elwing are characters in J. R. R. Tolkien's Middle-earth legendarium. They are depicted in The Silmarillion as Half-elven, the children of Men and Elves. He is a great seafarer who, on his brow, carried the Morning Star, (Note: Carpenter 2023, #297, draft, to Mr Rang, August 1967) a jewel called a Silmaril, across the sky. The jewel had been saved by Elwing from the destruction of the Havens of Sirion. The Morning Star and the Silmarils are elements of the symbolism of light, for divine creativity, continually splintered as history progresses. Tolkien took Eärendil's name from the Old English name Earendel, found in the poem Crist 1, which hailed him as "brightest of angels"; this was the beginning of Tolkien's Middle-earth mythology. Elwing is the granddaughter of Lúthien and Beren, and is descended from Melian the Maia, while Earendil is the son of Tuor and Idril. Through their progeny, Eärendil and Elwing became the ancestors of the Númenorean, and later Dúnedain, royal bloodline.

Eärendil is the subject, too, of the song in The Lord of the Rings sung and supposedly composed by Bilbo in Rivendell, described by Tom Shippey as exemplifying "an elvish streak ... signalled ... by barely-precedented intricacies" of poetry.

== Etymology ==
Eärendil means 'Lover of the Sea' in Tolkien's invented language of Quenya. However, Tolkien borrowed the name from Old English literature, in particular from the line "Eala Earendel, engla beorhtast" (Hail, Earendel, brightest of angels) of the poem Crist 1. Tolkien stated that the name came from the Old English name Ēarendel; he was struck by its "great beauty" c. 1913, which he perceived as "entirely coherent with the normal style of A-S, but euphonic to a peculiar degree in that pleasing but not 'delectable' language.". Elwing means "Star-spray" in the Elvish language Sindarin. (Note: Tolkien 1977, annotated Index entry for "Elwing") "Eärendil" was originally spelled by Tolkien as "Eärendel", before being modified.

== Fictional history ==
=== Background ===
Middle-earth was peopled in the First Age by immortal Elves, later followed by Men. The Elves became divided on their migrations, some settling in the Northwestern region called Beleriand. Fëanor, son of Finwë, the King of the Noldor, one branch of the Elves, had unique skill in craftsmanship, and forged three brilliant and highly prized jewels, the Silmarils, that shone like bright stars. The Dark Lord Morgoth desired the Silmarils for himself, and managed to seize them to put in his crown. There was enmity between Morgoth and the free peoples, Elves and Men. (Note: Tolkien 1977, "Quenta Silmarillion", chapters 1–5)

=== Eärendil ===
Eärendil was the half-elven son of a Man, Tuor, and an Elf, Idril, daughter of Turgon, the King of the hidden Elvish city of Gondolin. He was raised in Gondolin; when he was seven years old, he escaped the sacking of Gondolin with his parents. Eärendil was almost killed by his mother's treacherous cousin Maeglin, who had betrayed Gondolin to Morgoth; he was saved when his father killed Maeglin. Eärendil and his parents lived afterwards in Arvernien by the mouth of Sirion.

Eärendil became the leader of the people who lived there, and married Elwing, the half-elven daughter of Dior and the Sindar elf-maid Nimloth. Another alliance between Man and Elf, the hero Beren and his Elvish bride Lúthien, were Elwing's paternal grandparents. Eärendil and Elwing had two sons, Elrond and Elros. (Note: Tolkien 1977, ch. 24 "Of the Voyage of Eärendil and the War of Wrath")

With the aid of Círdan the Shipwright, Eärendil built a ship, Vingilótë (Quenya for "foam-flower"). He often sailed the seas west of Middle-earth, leaving his wife behind in Arvernien. At this time Elwing had in her possession the Silmaril that Beren had wrested from Morgoth. When Fëanor's sons, who wanted the Silmarils back, heard about this, they attacked Arvernien and killed most of the people living there. Elwing, rather than be captured, threw herself with the Silmaril into the sea. Next, according to The Silmarillion:

For Ulmo bore up Elwing out of the waves, and he gave her the likeness of a great white bird, and upon her breast there shone as a star the Silmaril, as she flew over the water to seek Eärendil her beloved. On a time of night Eärendil at the helm of his ship saw her come towards him, as a white cloud exceeding swift beneath the moon, as a star over the sea moving in strange courses, a pale flame on wings of storm. And it is sung that she fell from the air upon the timbers of Vingilot, in a swoon, nigh unto death for the urgency of her speed, and Eärendil took her to his bosom; but in the morning with marvelling eyes he beheld his wife in her own form beside him with her hair upon his face, and she slept.

Hearing of the tragedy that had befallen Arvernien, Eärendil then sought after the home of the godlike and immortal Valar, Valinor, aboard the Vingilot, and he and Elwing found their way there at last. Eärendil thus became the first of all mortals to set foot on Valinor. Eärendil then went before the Valar, and asked them for aid for Men and Elves in Middle-earth, to fight against Morgoth; the Valar accepted his plea.

Because Eärendil had undertaken this errand on behalf of Men and Elves, and not for his own sake, Manwë, King of the Valar, refrained from dealing out the punishment of death that was due for entering Valinor. Also, because both Eärendil and Elwing descended from a union of Elves and Men, Manwë granted to them and their sons the gift to choose to which race they would be joined. Elwing chose to be one of the Elves. Eärendil would have rather been one of the Men; however, for the sake of his wife, he chose to be one of the Elves also. His ship, Vingilot (Quenya: Vingilótë), was placed in the heavens, and he sailed it "even into the starless voids", but he returned at sunrise or sunset, glimmering in the sky as the Morning Star.

Eärendil's son Elrond too chose elvish immortality, becoming known as Half-elven, and in the Third Age played an important role in The War of the Ring, as narrated in The Lord of the Rings. Elros chose mortality, the gift of Men, founding the line of the Kings of Númenor; his descendant at the time of The War of the Ring was Aragorn, one of the Fellowship of the Ring, who married Elrond's daughter, Arwen. (Note: Tolkien 1955, Appendix A: Annals of the Kings and Rulers: I The Númenórean Kings: (v) The Tale of Aragorn and Arwen)

The Valar marched into the north of Middle-earth and attacked the Throne of Morgoth in the War of Wrath. Morgoth set loose a fleet of winged dragons, which drove the Valar back. Eärendil in Vingilot attacked, with Thorondor and his great eagles, and killed Ancalagon the Black, greatest of the dragons. Ancalagon fell on to Thangorodrim and broke its towers. The Valar won the battle, destroying the dragons and the pits of Angband, captured Morgoth, and took the two remaining Silmarils from his crown.

=== Family tree ===
Half-elven family tree (Note: Tolkien 1977, "Of the Rings of Power and the Third Age": Family Trees I and II: "The house of Finwë and the Noldorin descent of Elrond and Elros", and "The descendants of Olwë and Elwë") (Note: Tolkien 1955, Appendix A: Annals of the Kings and Rulers, I The Númenórean Kings)

Melian the Maia	Thingol of the Teleri	House of Bëor	House of Haleth	House of Hador	Finwë of the Noldor	Indis of the Vanyar	Olwë of the Teleri
Barahir	Belegund	Hareth	Galdor	Fingolfin	Finarfin	Eärwen
Lúthien	Beren	Rían	Huor	Húrin	Turgon	Elenwë
Dior	Nimloth	Tuor	Idril
Eluréd	Elurín	Elwing	Eärendil	Celeborn	Galadriel
Elros	Elrond	Celebrían
22 Kings of Númenor and Lords of Andúnië
Elendil
Isildur	Anárion
22 Kings of Arnor and Arthedain	27 Kings of Gondor
Arvedui	Fíriel
15 Dúnedain; Chieftains
Aragorn	Arwen	Elladan	Elrohir
Eldarion	daughters

Colour key:
Colour	Description
	Elves
	Men
	Maiar
	Half-elven
	Half-elven who chose the fate of Elves
	Half-elven who chose the fate of mortal Men

== Concept and creation ==
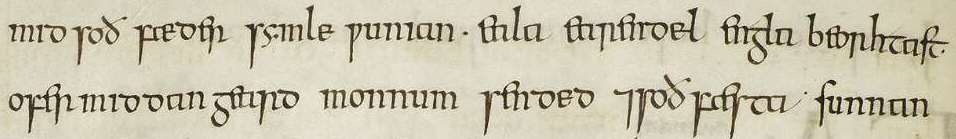
Ēala ēarendel engla beorhtast / ofer middangeard monnum sended ("Hail, Earendel, brightest of angels, Over Middle-earth to men sent", second half of top line, first half of second line) - part of the poem Crist I in the Exeter Book, folio 9v, top, which inspired Tolkien

Imagemap with clickable links. Crist I's influence on Tolkien's legendarium It has been called "the catalyst for Tolkien's mythology".

Humphrey Carpenter, in his biography of Tolkien, remarked that Eärendil "was in fact the beginning of Tolkien's own mythology". In 1914, Tolkien wrote a poem The Voyage of Earendel the Evening Star, inspired by the Crist I poem. While studying at Oxford, Tolkien developed a constructed language that later became known as Quenya. Already around 1915 he had the idea that this language needed an internal history and was spoken by Elves whom his invented character Eärendil meets during his journeys. The next step in the creation of the underlying mythology was the Lay of Earendel, a work composed of several poems that describes the mariner Earendel and his voyages and how his ship is turned into a star. The mysterious land of Valinor and its Two Trees shining gold and silver across the land were first described in this cycle. The poem was published in The Book of Lost Tales 2. (Note: Tolkien 1984b, pp. 267–269)

Tolkien was aware of the name's Germanic cognates (Old Norse Aurvandill, Lombardic Auriwandalo); the question why the Old English rather than the Lombardic or Proto-Germanic form should be taken up in the mythology is alluded to in The Notion Club Papers. The Old Norse together with the Old English evidence point to an astronomical myth, the name referring to a star, or a group of stars; the Old English in particular points to the morning star as the herald of the rising Sun, Christianized to refer to John the Baptist. Tolkien stated in a 1967 letter that the Old English uses of ēarendel "seem plainly to indicate that it was a star presaging the dawn... that is what we now call Venus: the morning star as it may be seen shining brilliantly in the dawn, before the actual rising of the sun. That is at any rate how I took it [when creating Eärendil as a mariner and "a herald star"]." (Note: Tolkien 1984b, p. 266)

Tolkien was particularly inspired by the Crist lines:

éala éarendel engla beorhtast / ofer middangeard monnum sended
Hail Earendel, brightest of angels, over Middle-earth to men sent

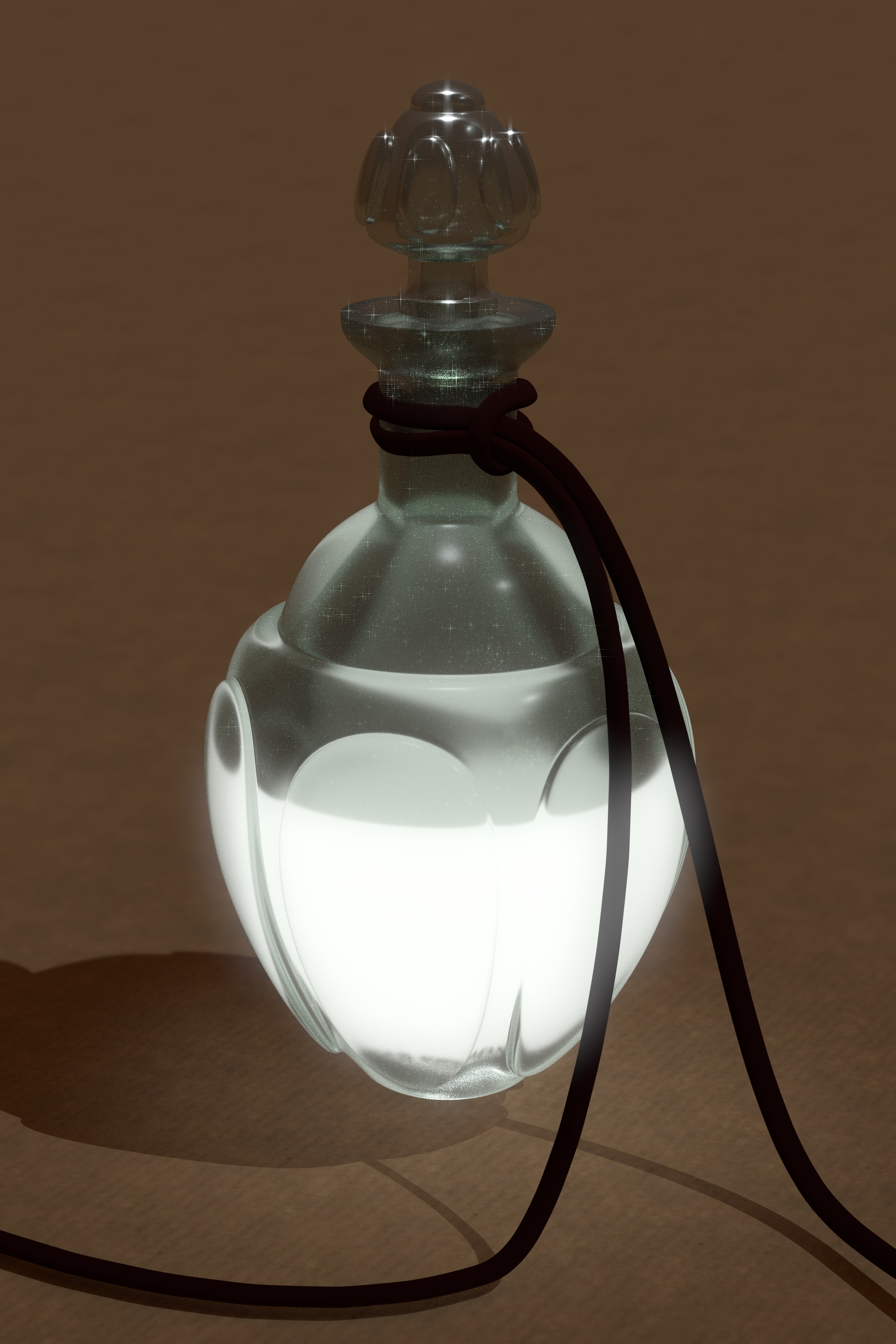
The Phial of Galadriel that Frodo carried contained a tiny fraction of the light of Eärendil's star. It helped the hobbits to defeat Shelob.

The first of the Crist lines is parallelled by Frodo Baggins's exclamation in The Two Towers, Aiya Eärendil Elenion Ancalima!, which in Tolkien's invented language of Quenya means, "Hail Eärendil, brightest of stars!" Frodo's exclamation was in reference to the "Star-glass" he carried, the Phial of Galadriel, which contained a little of the light of Eärendil's star, the Silmaril.

These lines from Crist can be taken as the inspiration not only for the role of Eärendil in Tolkien's work from as early as 1914, but for the term Middle-earth (translating Old English Middangeard) for the inhabitable lands (cf. Midgard). Accordingly, the medievalists Stuart D. Lee and Elizabeth Solopova state that Crist A was "the catalyst for Tolkien's mythology".

== Analysis ==
=== Splintered light ===
The Tolkien scholar Verlyn Flieger writes in her 1983 book Splintered Light: Logos and Language in Tolkien's World that a central theme of Tolkien's writing is the progressive fragmentation of the light from the moment of the creation; light symbolises both the divine creation and the author's subcreation.

The light begins in The Silmarillion as a unity, and in accordance with the splintering of creation is divided into more and more fragments as the myth progresses. Middle-earth is peopled by the angelic Valar and lit by two great lamps; when these are destroyed by the fallen Vala Melkor, the world is fragmented, and the Valar retreat to Valinor, which is lit by The Two Trees. When these too are destroyed, their last fragment of light is made into the Silmarils, and a sapling too is rescued, leading to the White Tree of Númenor, the living symbol of the Kingdom of Gondor. Wars are fought over the Silmarils, and they are lost to the Earth, the Sea, and the Sky.

The last of the Silmarils, carried by Eärendil the Mariner, becomes the Morning Star as he sails across the sky with the shining jewel in his ship Vingilot. By the time of The Lord of the Rings, in the Third Age, that is all that is left of the light. Some of the star's light is captured in Galadriel's Mirror, the magic fountain that allows her to see past, present, and future; and some of that light is, finally, trapped in the Phial of Galadriel, her parting gift to Frodo, the counterbalance to Sauron's evil and powerful Ring that Frodo is also carrying. At each stage, the fragmentation increases and the power decreases. Thus the theme of light as Divine power, fragmented and refracted through the works of created beings, is central to the whole mythology.

Age	Splintering of the Created Light
Years of the Lamps	Two enormous lamps, Illuin and Ormal, atop tall pillars, give light to Middle-earth, but Melkor destroys them.
Years of the Trees	The lamps are replaced by the Two Trees of Valinor, Telperion and Laurelin, lighting the blessed realm of Valinor for the Elves, leaving Middle-earth in darkness.
Years of the Trees	Fëanor crafts 3 Silmarils with light of the two Trees.
Years of the Trees	Melkor and the giant spider Ungoliant kill the Two Trees; their light survives only in the Silmarils.
First Age	There is war over the Silmarils.
First Age	One is buried in the Earth, one is lost in the Sea, one sails in the Sky as Eärendil's Star, carried in his ship Vingilot.
Third Age	Galadriel collects light of Eärendil's Star reflected in her fountain mirror.
Third Age	A little of that light is captured in the Phial of Galadriel.
Third Age	The Hobbits Frodo Baggins and Sam Gamgee use the Phial to defeat the giant spider Shelob.

=== Wade ===
The Tolkien scholar Tibor Tarcsay writes that Eärendil is based not only on Old English but also Indo-European and universal myths. Wade has power over the sea and superhuman strength, while numerous other mythical Indo-European figures share Eärendil's conjunction of water, boat or horse, and herald or star, such as Surya, the sun-god of the Vedas, or Apollo with his horse-drawn chariot which pulls the sun across the sky. Vingilot is mentioned in Geoffrey Chaucer's The Merchant's Tale as the name of Wade's ship; Wade is in turn mentioned in the Old English poem Widsith, while Sir Gawain's horse has a name similar to Vingilot, Gryngolet. Christopher Tolkien, too, noted the matching boat-names, Guingelot for Wade and Wingelot for Earendel, and stated that the link between Wade and Tuor was "not casual", which Flieger takes to mean, certainly intentional. Flieger notes further that in Parma Eldalamberon 15, Tolkien unambiguously wrote "Wade = Earendel".

=== Echoes of other legends ===
Tolkien's legend of Eärendil has elements resembling the Mabinogion or the Christian legend of St. Brendan the Navigator.

=== The long-suffering woman ===
Elwing's staying at home waiting for her husband to return from his vain voyages across the ocean echoes the literary motif of the "long-suffering woman". The choice of fate offered by the Valar to Eärendil and Elwing, resulting in both of them becoming immortal Elves, has been interpreted as a move of Tolkien to solve "several untidy plot points in one fell swoop": being Half-elven, neither of the two would have been allowed to set foot in the land of the Valar, nor was their eventual fate determined since in Tolkien's legendarium Men are mortal, while Elves will live until the world is undone. The metamorphosis of the couple continues as Eärendil's ship is transformed into a flying vessel, so he can continue his journeys in the sky rather than at sea. Still now, Elwing will remain at home, but she is granted a white tower to dwell in.

== Song of Eärendil ==
The longest poem in The Lord of the Rings is the Song of Eärendil which Bilbo sings, and supposedly composed, at Rivendell. This poem has an extraordinarily complex history, deriving through many versions from his light-hearted poem "Errantry". (Note: Tolkien 1989, pp. 84–105) The Song of Eärendil is described by Tom Shippey as exemplifying "an elvish streak .. signalled .. by barely-precedented intricacies" of poetry, an approach derived from the Middle English poem Pearl. The song was recorded by The Tolkien Ensemble on their 2005 CD Leaving Rivendell.
