= Last of a Dying Breed (disambiguation) =

"Last of a Dying Breed" is a song by Joji.

Last of a Dying Breed may also refer to:

- The Last of a Dying Breed, a 2000 album by Scarface, or the title track
- Last of a Dying Breed, a 2012 EP by Biters
- Last of a Dyin' Breed, a 2012 album by Lynyrd Skynyrd, or the title track
- "Last of a Dying Breed", a song by Young Jeezy from the album Let's Get It: Thug Motivation 101, 2005
- "The Last of a Dying Breed", a song by Neal McCoy from the album That's Life, 2005
- "Last of a Dying Breed", a song by Ludacris from the album Theater of the Mind, 2008
- "Last of a Dying Breed", a 2013 song by JJ Lawhorn
- "Last of a Dying Breed", a 2025 song by Wade Forster

== See also ==
- Dying Breed (disambiguation)
- Rare Breed (disambiguation)
- Decline (disambiguation)
- Endangered species
