= Dying Breed =

Dying Breed may refer to:

- Dying Breed (film), a 2008 Australian horror film
- "Dying Breed" (The Killers song), 2020
- "Dying Breed", a song by Five Finger Death Punch from the album War Is the Answer, 2009
- "Dyin Breed", a song by Polo G from the album Die a Legend, 2019
- "The Dying Breed", a soundtrack from the manga Beck

== See also ==
- Last of a Dying Breed (disambiguation)
- Rare Breed
- Decline (disambiguation)
- Endangered species
