= Decline and Fall (disambiguation) =

Decline and Fall is a novel by the English author Evelyn Waugh, first published in 1928.

Decline and Fall may also refer to:

- Decline and Fall... of a Birdwatcher, a 1968 British film based on Waugh's novel
- Decline and Fall (TV series), 2017 BBC TV adaption of the novel with Jack Whitehall
- Decline and Fall of the Roman Empire (game), a 1972 board game
- "Peggy Hill: The Decline and Fall (Part 2)", an episode of the television series King of the Hill
- The History of the Decline and Fall of the Roman Empire by Edward Gibbon, a major literary achievement of the 18th century
- Decline & Fall (EP), a 2014 EP by English industrial metal band Godflesh
- Decline and Fall (Song), a 2024 single by Welsh band Manic Street Preachers.
- Decline and Fall: Europe's Slow Motion Suicide, a 2008 book by Bruce Thornton
- Decline and fall in Middle-earth, as created by J.R.R. Tolkien
