= Two Trees of Valinor =

Symbols in Tolkien's legendarium

In J. R. R. Tolkien's legendarium, the Two Trees of Valinor are Telperion and Laurelin, the Silver Tree and the Gold Tree, which bring light to Valinor, a paradisiacal realm where the Valar and Maiar, angel-like divine beings, and many of the Elves live. The Two Trees are of enormous size and exude dew that is a pure and magical light in liquid form.

The Elvish craftsman Fëanor made the unrivalled jewels, the Silmarils, with their light. The Two Trees are destroyed by the evil beings Ungoliant and Melkor, but their last flower and fruit are made into the Moon and the Sun. Melkor, now known as Morgoth, steals the Silmarils, provoking the disastrous War of the Jewels. Later, the tree Galathillion is made, identical to Telperion, other than that it does not emit its own light. A seedling of Galathillion is planted in Tol Eressëa, called Celeborn. Descendants of Celeborn survive, growing in Númenor and, after its destruction, in Gondor; in both cases, the trees are symbolic of those kingdoms. For many years, while Gondor has no King, the White Tree of Gondor stands dead in the citadel of Minas Tirith. When Aragorn restores the line of Kings to Gondor, he finds a sapling descended from Telperion and plants it in his citadel.

Commentators have identified mythic and Christian symbolism in the Two Trees; they have been described as the most important symbols in the entire legendarium. Their origins have been traced to the Trees of the Sun and the Moon in medieval mythology. Parallels have also been identified with Celtic mythology, where several pairs of trees appear. The White Tree of Gondor, too, has been traced to the medieval Dry Tree, a symbol of the resurrection of Jesus.

Verlyn Flieger has described the progressive splintering of the light of the Two Trees through Middle-earth's troubled history, noting that light represents the Christian Logos. Tom Shippey links the sundering of the Elves into different groups to the Two Trees and to the Prose Edda which speaks of Dökkálfar and Ljósálfar (light and dark elves); Tolkien treats the difference between these as whether they have made the journey to Valinor and seen the light of the Two Trees.

== Narrative ==
=== Prelude ===
The first sources of light for all of Tolkien's imaginary world, Arda, are two enormous Lamps on the central continent, Middle-earth: Illuin, the silver one to the north, and Ormal, the golden one to the south. They are created by the Valar, powerful spirit beings, but are thrown down and destroyed by the Dark Lord Melkor. (Note: Tolkien 1977, ch. 1 "Of the Beginning of Days")

=== Creation ===
The Valar retreat to Valinor to make their home on the western continent, and there one of them, Yavanna the Vala of living things, sings into existence the Two Trees to provide a new pair of light-sources. Of the two, Telperion is male and silver, while the other, Laurelin, is female and golden. The Trees stand on the hill Ezellohar, outside Valimar, the city of the Valar. They grow in the presence of all the Valar, watered by the tears of the Vala of pity and mourning, Nienna. Telperion's leaves are dark green above and silver below. His flowers are white like cherry blossom, (Note: Tolkien 1987, p. 209) and his silvery dew is collected as a source of water and of light. Varda used the dew to form stars in the sky, in preparation for the arrival of the Elves. Laurelin has leaves of a young green, like newly opened beech leaves trimmed with gold, and her dew is collected by the Vala of light Varda.

Each Tree, in turn, gives off light for seven hours (waxing to full brightness and then slowly waning again), with the ends of their cycles overlapping, so that at one hour each of "dawn" and "dusk" soft gold and silver light are given off together. Each "day" of first silver then gold light lasts twelve hours.

Arda in the Years of the Trees

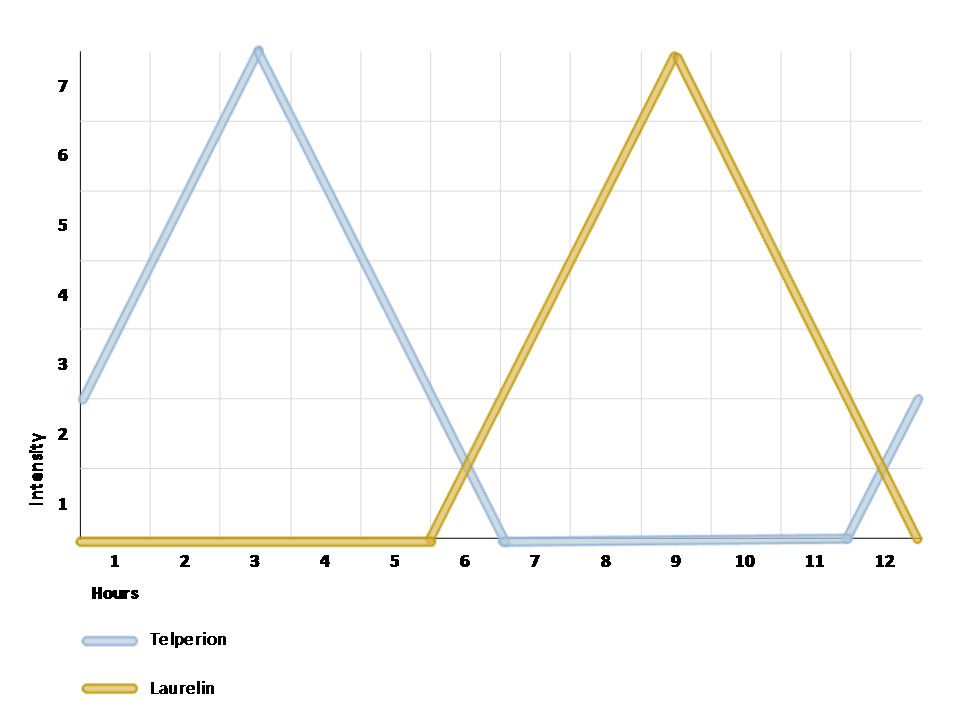
Tolkien stated that the light from the Two Trees of Valinor alternately waxed and waned, overlapping by an hour.

=== Destruction ===
Countless "days" pass, until Melkor reappears. He enlists the help of the giant spider Ungoliant to destroy the Two Trees. Concealed in a cloud of darkness, Melkor strikes each Tree and the insatiable Ungoliant devours whatever life and light remains in it. (Note: Tolkien 1977, ch. 8 "Of the Darkening of Valinor")

=== Aftermath ===
Yavanna and Nienna attempt a healing, but they succeed only in reviving Telperion's last flower to become the Moon and Laurelin's last fruit to become the Sun. These are turned into flying ships crossing the sky, and each is steered by spirits of the same 'genders' as the Trees themselves: male Tilion and female Arien. This is why, in The Lord of the Rings, the Sun is called "she" and the Moon "he". (Note: Tolkien 1977, ch. 11 "Of the Sun and Moon and the Hiding of Valinor") The true light of the Trees now resides only in the three Silmarils, jewels crafted by the Elf Fëanor with the light of the Two Trees before their destruction. (Note: Tolkien 1977, ch. 9 "Of the Flight of the Noldor")

Coat of arms of Gondor bearing the white tree, Nimloth the fair

Because the Elves that first came to Valinor especially loved Telperion, Yavanna takes a cutting from the tree and makes a second tree like it to stand in their city of Tirion. This tree, named Galathilion, is identical to Telperion except that it does not emit light. It has many seedlings, one of which is named Celeborn, and grows on the isle of Tol Eressëa. (Note: Tolkien 1977, ch. 5 "Of Eldamar and the Princes of the Eldalië")

In the Second Age, a seedling of Celeborn is brought as a gift to the Men who live on the island of Númenor. It is Nimloth, the White Tree of Númenor. When the Dark Lord Sauron takes control of the island, he makes King Ar-Pharazôn cut it down. (Note: Tolkien 1977, "Akallabêth: The Downfall of Númenor") The hero Isildur saves a single fruit of Nimloth, and plants seedlings in Middle-earth. (Note: Tolkien 1977, "Of the Rings of Power and the Third Age")

During the rule of the Stewards of Gondor, the White Tree of Gondor, a descendant of Nimloth, stands dead in the citadel of Minas Tirith. On Aragorn's return as King at the end of the Third Age, he finds a seedling in the snow on the mountain behind the city, and brings it back to the citadel, where it flourishes.

Tolkien never mentioned any tree made in the likeness of Laurelin, writing that "of Laurelin the Golden no likeness is left in Middle-Earth". (Note: Tolkien 1955, Appendix A, I (i) Númenor) In the First Age, however, the Elvish King Turgon of the city of Gondolin creates a non-living image of Laurelin, named Glingal, 'Hanging Flame', which stands in his court. (Note: Tolkien 1977, ch. 15 "Of the Noldor in Beleriand")

== Origins ==
=== Medieval Trees of the Sun and the Moon ===
The Tolkien scholar John Garth traces the mythology and symbolism of the Two Trees to the medieval Trees of the Sun and the Moon. Tolkien stated in an interview (Note: Garth states (in a footnote, no. 43) this was a radio interview with Denys Geroult, BBC, 1965.) that the Two Trees derived from them, "in the great Alexander stories" rather than from the World Tree Yggdrasil of Norse myth. Garth notes that the Wonders of the East, an Old English manuscript in the same Codex as Beowulf, tells that Alexander the Great travelled beyond India to Paradise, where he saw the two magical trees. They drip down a wonderful balsam, and have the power of speech. They tell Alexander that he will die in Babylon. Garth writes that Tolkien's trees emit light, not balsam, and that, rather than prophesying death, their own deaths bring Arda's era of immortality to an end.

=== Trees in Celtic mythology ===
Marie Barnfield, writing in Mallorn, states that the male/female pair of trees has numerous parallels in Celtic mythology, including the pine trees of Deirdre and Naoise, and the paired rose bush of Esyllt and vine of Trystan. Further, the hill of Ezellohar in front of Valimar's western gate matches the "sacred centre of Ireland", the Hill of Uisneach "to the west of Tara". The Two Trees of Valinor, in this context, align with the "feminine" Ash tree of Uisnech, and the "masculine" Lia Fáil, the standing stone on the hill of Tara. Lastly, the dews of Telperion and the rains from Laurelin that served "as wells of water and of light" match up, according to Barnfield, with Connla's Well and the Well of Segais.

=== The Sampo in the Kalevala ===
Tolkien read the Finnish Kalevala closely. Its central symbol is the magical Sampo, a device that brought wealth and good fortune to its owner, but whose mechanism is described only vaguely. Jonathan Himes, writing in Mythlore, has suggested that Tolkien found the Sampo complex, and chose to split the Sampo's parts into desirable objects. Its pillar became the Two Trees of Valinor with their Tree of life aspect, illuminating the world. Its decorated lid became the brilliant Silmarils, which embodied all that was left of the light of the Two Trees, thus tying the symbols together.

=== The Dry Tree ===
Cynthia Cohen writes in Tolkien Studies that the White Tree of Gondor in The Lord of the Rings stands for "the deeper history of Men in Tolkien's Secondary World, reaching back to [its ancestors,] the Two Trees of Valinor". During most of the action of the novel, the tree is dead, and has been for over a century, but all the same it serves as a symbol of Gondor's strength and national identity, and of hope for the Kingdom's renewal. She suggests that the White Tree parallels the Dry Tree mentioned in the 14th century text Mandeville's Travels. The Dry Tree had been alive in the time of Christ, and was prophesied to come to life again when a "great lord from the western part of the world" returned to the Holy Land, just as Aragorn brings the line of Kings back to Gondor. Cohen comments that the dead White Tree's replacement by a living sapling "upholds the metaphor of resurrection and enables Tolkien to draw an implicit connection between Aragorn and Christ". Finally, she remarks on the verse that Aragorn recites when he sees the White Mountains of Gondor: "West Wind blew there; the light upon the Silver Tree / Fell like bright rain in gardens in the Kings of old," which she states links Telperion, the Silver Tree of Valinor, to the White Tree. Since Tolkien has left it ambiguous whether the Silver Tree of the verse, the place where the West Wind blew, or where the "bright rain" fell, are in long-ago Valinor or present-time Gondor, the ancestry of the tree and the lineage of the Kings merge into a continuum.

Patrick Curry, in the J.R.R. Tolkien Encyclopedia, writes that the importance that Tolkien gives to the Two Trees shows "the iconic status of trees in both his work and his life." Richard Goetsch adds that the Two Trees are "central to many of the crucial plot developments of the entire saga, from the beginning of the First Age to the end of the Third Age", and further that they "function as the ultimate expression of the natural world in Tolkien's mythos."

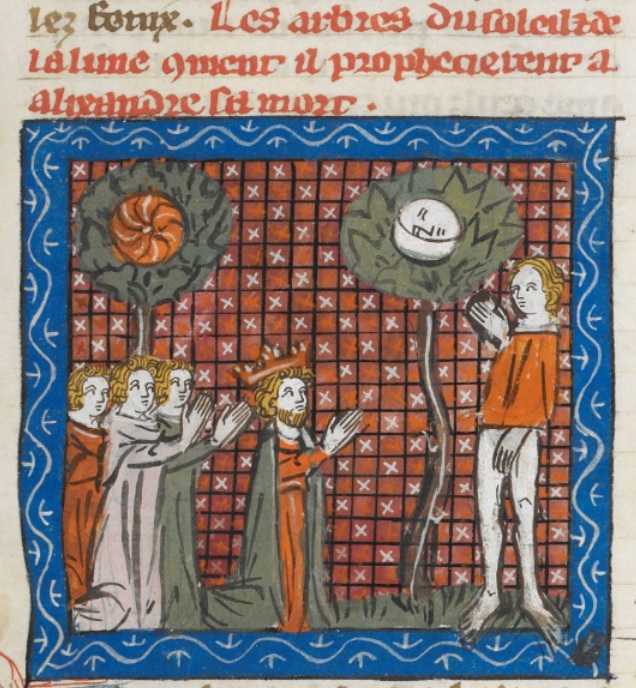
Alexander the Great and followers kneeling in prayer at the Trees of the Sun and the Moon, under the guidance of a high priest. England 1333-c. 1340

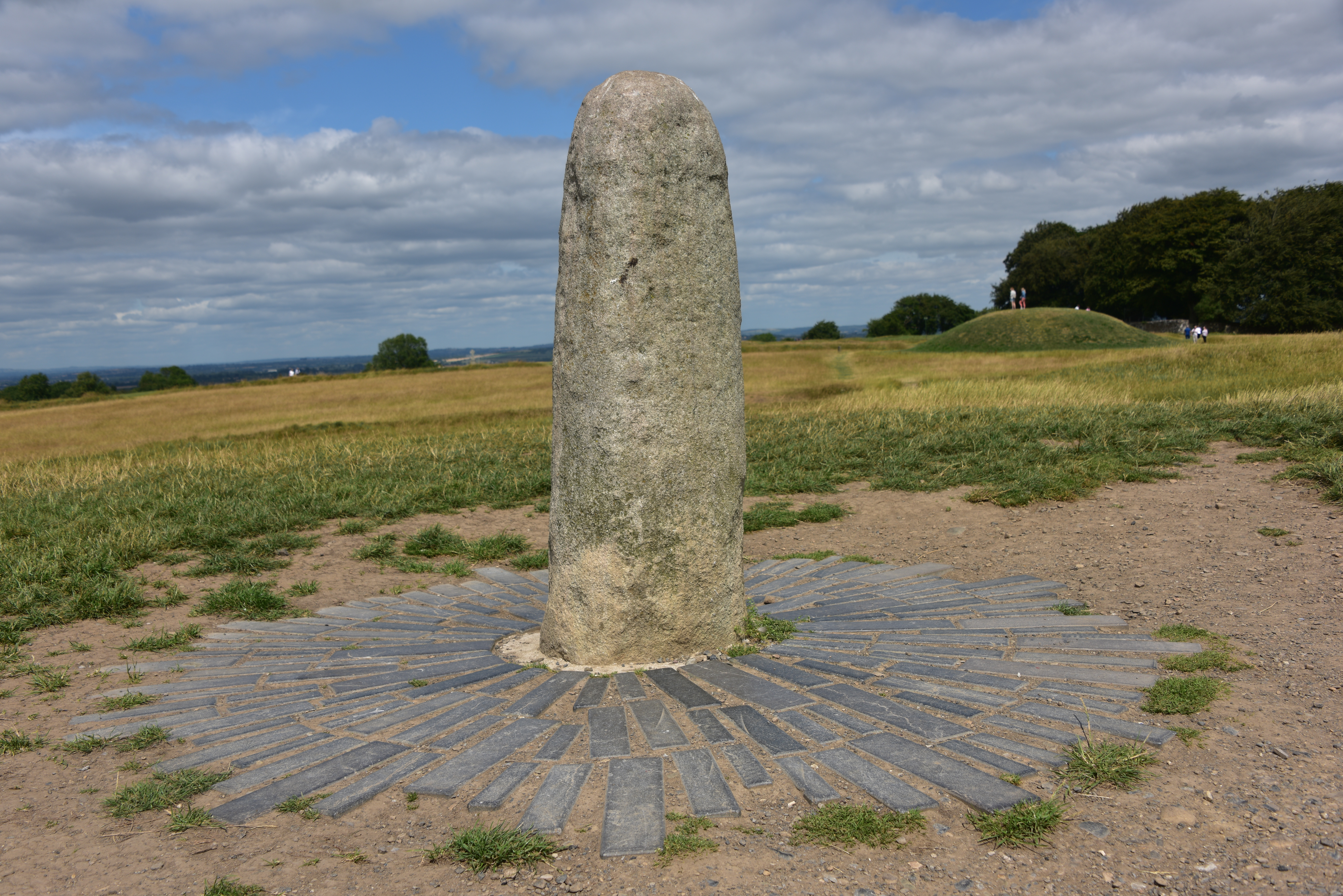
Celtic symbol: The Lia Fáil on the hill of Tara

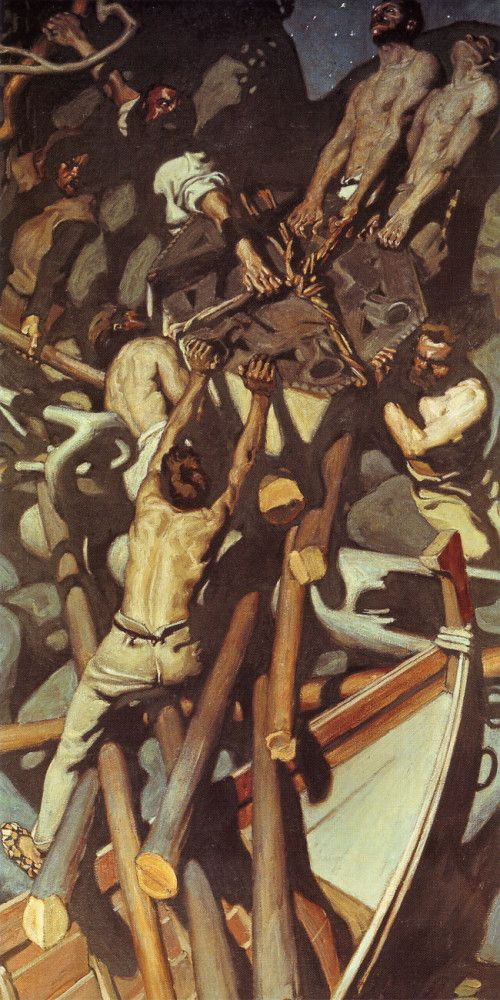
Magical symbol in the Kalevala: The Theft of the Sampo by Akseli Gallen-Kallela, 1897

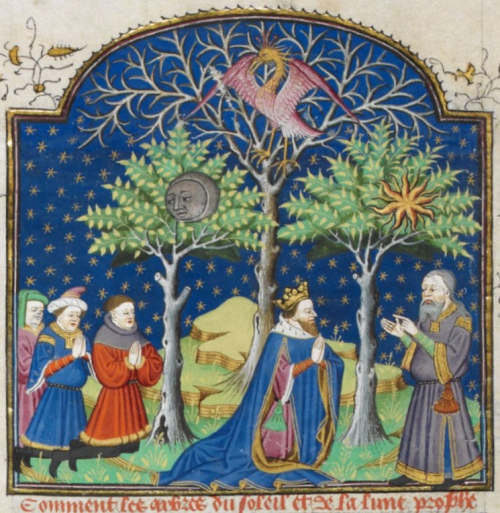
The Dry Tree with the Phoenix, flanked by the Trees of the Sun and the Moon. Rouen 1444-1445

== Analysis ==
=== The Elder Days ===
Matthew Dickerson writes in the J.R.R. Tolkien Encyclopedia that the Two Trees are "the most important mythic symbols in all of the legendarium". He quotes Tolkien's words in The Silmarillion that "about their fate all the tales of the Elder days are woven". The Two Trees have a central place because they are the source of the light for the world of Arda while they live, and they are the ancestors of the various trees that symbolise the Kingdoms of Númenor and later of Gondor. Further, they contain the "thought of things that grow in the earth", placed in them by the Vala Yavanna when she sang them into being. Angelica Varandas likewise comments that the Two Trees are "the most significant symbols of peace, prosperity and order" in the legendarium, and calls them axis mundi trees, like those in the Garden of Eden or the Norse world-tree, Yggdrasil.

=== Light ===
Tolkien, as a Roman Catholic, knew the significance of light in Christian symbolism; he equated it with the Christian Logos, the Divine Word. The scholar Lisa Coutras states that transcendental light is an essential element of his subcreated world. In it, the Two Trees embody the light of creation, which in turn reflects God's light.

Verlyn Flieger describes the progressive splintering of the first created light, down through successive catastrophes. After the destruction of the twin lamps of Arda, Yavanna recreates what she can of the light in the Two Trees; Varda catches some of the light, and Fëanor creates the Silmarils, filled with the light. They are the unrivalled jewels that give The Silmarillion its name, and serve as the centrepiece of its narrative. The whole of the history of Tolkien's First Age is strongly affected by the desire of many characters, including the Dark Lord Morgoth (as Melkor is now known) to possess the Silmarils that contain the only remaining unsullied light of the Trees. Morgoth desires them for himself, and manages to steal them, provoking the world-changing War of the Jewels. One of the Silmarils survives, and Varda puts it in the sky to symbolise hope: it is Venus, the Morning and Evening Star.

Tom Shippey, like Tolkien a philologist, analyses Tolkien's treatment of the light and dark elves mentioned in the 13th century Prose Edda: in Old Norse, Ljósálfar and Dökkálfar. Tolkien makes the distinguishing feature between these two groups whether the Elves had seen the light of the Two Trees of Valinor, or not. To make this work, Tolkien creates a story in which the Elves awaken in Middle-earth, and are called to undertake the long journey to Valinor. The Elves of the Light, Tolkien's Calaquendi, are those who successfully complete the journey, while the Elves of the Darkness, the Moriquendi, are those Elves who, for whatever reason, do not arrive in Valinor. (Note: Tolkien 1994, "Quendi and Eldar")

Diagram of the Sundering of the Elves, showing Tolkien's overlapping classifications. The main division is into Calaquendi and Moriquendi, Light-Elves and Dark-Elves, meaning those who had or had not seen the light of the Two Trees. These names correspond to those in Old Norse, Ljósálfar and Dökkálfar.

=== Elves and Men ===
Matthew Dickerson writes that in the Second and Third Ages, the White Trees of Númenor and of Gondor, whose likeness descends from that of Telperion, have a mostly symbolic significance, standing both for the kingdoms in question, and also as reminders of the ancestral alliance between the Men who had lived on Númenor and the Elves. The destruction of one of these trees precedes trouble for each kingdom in question.

Martin Simonson describes the destruction of the Two Trees as setting a "mythical precedent" for the transfer of the stewardship of Arda (Earth) from the Valar to Elves and Men. In his view, this stewardship is central to the moral battle, as the Two Trees, like Men and Elves, are composed of both matter and spirit. Dickerson and Jonathan Evans note that Tolkien calls the Elves "stewards and guardians of [Middle-earth's] beauty"; they are constantly preoccupied with maintaining the beauty of nature, something they inherited from Yavanna's making of the Two Trees.

== See also ==
- Galadriel
- Tolkien's legendarium
- Cosmology of Tolkien's legendarium

== Sources ==
- Flieger, Verlyn (1983). Splintered Light: Logos and Language in Tolkien's World. Wm. B. Eerdmans. ISBN 0-8028-1955-9.
- Tolkien, J. R. R. (1955). The Return of the King. The Lord of the Rings. Boston: Houghton Mifflin. OCLC 519647821.
- Tolkien, J. R. R. (1977). Christopher Tolkien (ed.). The Silmarillion. Boston: Houghton Mifflin. ISBN 978-0-395-25730-2.
- Tolkien, J. R. R. (1987). Christopher Tolkien (ed.). The Lost Road and Other Writings. Boston: Houghton Mifflin. ISBN 0-395-45519-7.
- Tolkien, J. R. R. (1994). Christopher Tolkien (ed.). The War of the Jewels. Boston: Houghton Mifflin. ISBN 0-395-71041-3.
