= Declination (disambiguation) =

Declination is a noun form of the verb decline and may refer to:

- Declination, coordinate used in astronomy
- Magnetic declination, angle that must be added or subtracted in the use of compass for geography
- Grid declination, angle between the compass north and north direction of the map coordinate grid
- Clinamen, a concept in early atomic theory

== See also ==
- Declension, use of case in linguistics
- Decline (disambiguation)
