= Rare Breed =

Rare Breed may refer to:

- Rare breed, a breed of poultry or livestock that has a very small breeding population
- Rare Breed (album), by MC Breed, 2000
- Rare Breed, a late 1960s band whose members included Ozzy Osbourne, Geezer Butler (both later of Black Sabbath) and Roger Hope
- The Rare Breed, a 1966–67 era band whose recordings were released by the Ohio Express
- A Rare Breed, a 1984 drama film starring George Kennedy
- The Rare Breed, a 1966 western film

== See also ==
- Last of a Dying Breed (disambiguation)
- Dying Breed (disambiguation)
- Endangered species
- Lists of breeds
