= Fëanor =

Character in J.R.R. Tolkien's Middle-Earth

- Tolkien character
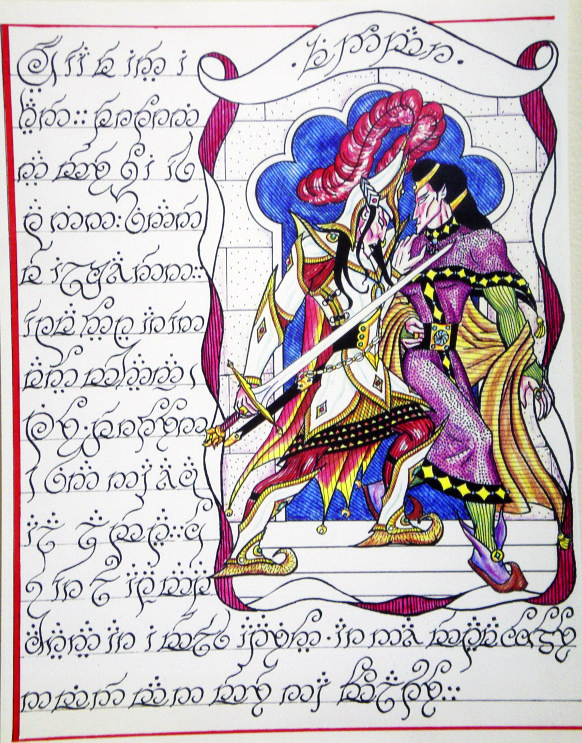
- Fëanor (left) threatens Fingolfin; Middle-earth artwork by Tom Loback, 2007

In-universe information
- Aliases: Fëanáro, Curufinwë
- Race: Elves
- Book(s): The Silmarillion (1977)

Fëanor (Quenya pronunciation: [ˈfɛ.anɔr]) is a fictional character in J. R. R. Tolkien's The Silmarillion. He creates the Tengwar script, the palantír seeing-stones, and the three Silmarils, the skilfully forged jewels that give the book their name and theme, triggering division and destruction. He is the eldest son of Finwë, the King of the Noldor Elves, and his first wife Míriel.

Fëanor's Silmarils form a central theme of The Silmarillion as Men and Elves battle with the forces of evil for their possession. After the Dark Lord Morgoth steals the Silmarils, Fëanor and his seven sons swear the Oath of Fëanor, vowing to fight anyone and everyone—whether Elf, Man, Maia, or Vala—who withholds the Silmarils.

The oath commands Fëanor and his sons to press to Middle-earth, in the process committing atrocities against their fellow Elves, the first Kinslaying, at the havens of the Teleri. Fëanor dies soon after his arrival in Middle-earth; his sons unite in the cause of defeating Morgoth and retrieving the Silmarils, but end up causing further harm among the Elves.

The Tolkien scholar Jane Chance has seen Fëanor's pride as leading to his downfall, alongside Morgoth's corruption of Elves and Men as reflecting Satan's temptation of Adam and Eve, and the desire for godlike knowledge as in the Garden of Eden. Others have likened Fëanor to the Anglo-Saxon leader Byrhtnoth whose foolish pride led to defeat and death at the Battle of Maldon. Tom Shippey writes that the pride is specifically a desire to make things that reflect their own personality, and likens this to Tolkien's own desire to sub-create. John Ellison further likens this creative pride to that of the protagonist in Thomas Mann's 1947 novel Doctor Faustus, noting that both that novel and Tolkien's own legendarium were responses to World War.

== Fictional history ==
=== Early life ===
Fëanor's father is Finwë, the first King of the Noldor; his mother, Míriel, dies, "consumed in spirit and body", shortly after giving birth to him. Fëanor "was made the mightiest in all parts of body and mind: in valour, in endurance, in beauty, in understanding, in skill, in strength and subtlety alike: of all the Children of Ilúvatar, and a bright flame was in him." Finwë remarries and has several children, including Fëanor's half-brothers Fingolfin and Finarfin. Fëanor studies under his father-in-law Mahtan, who was a student of the godlike Vala Aulë. He becomes a craftsman and gem-smith, inventor of the Tengwar script, and the creator of the magical seeing-stones, the palantíri. (Note: Tolkien 1977, Chapter 6 "Of Fëanor and the Unchaining of Melkor")

=== Silmarils ===
Fëanor, "in the greatest of his achievements, captured the light of the Two Trees to make the three Silmarils, also called the Great Jewels, though they were not mere glittering stones, they were alive, imperishable, and sacred." (Note: Tolkien 1977, Chapter 7, "Of the Silmarils and the Unrest of the Noldor") Even the Valar with their godlike powers could not copy them. In fact, Fëanor himself could not copy them, as part of his essence goes into their making. Their worth is close to infinite, as they are unique and irreplaceable. The Vala "Varda hallowed the Silmarils so that thereafter no mortal flesh, nor hands unclean, nor anything of evil will might touch them, for it would be scorched and withered."

Fëanor prizes the Silmarils, and grows suspicious of the Valar and Elves who he believes covet them. The Vala Melkor, recently released from imprisonment and now residing in Valinor, sees an opportunity to sow dissent among the Noldor. Fëanor refuses to communicate with Melkor, but is still caught in his plot. Fëanor angrily warns Fingolfin not to spread lies, and threatens to kill him. As punishment, the Valar exile Fëanor to his remote home Formenos for twelve years. Finwë too withdraws to Formenos.

The Valar learn that Melkor is manipulating Fëanor, and send one of their number, Tulkas, to capture Melkor, but he has already escaped. Fëanor wisely realises that Melkor's goal is to obtain the Silmarils, "and he shut the doors of his house in the face of the mightiest of all the dwellers in Eä." The Valar invite Fëanor and Fingolfin to Valinor to make peace. Fingolfin offers a hand to his half-brother, recognising Fëanor's place as the eldest. Fëanor accepts, but soon Melkor and Ungoliant destroy The Two Trees, (Note: Tolkien 1977, ch. 8, "Of the Darkening of Valinor") leaving the Silmarils as the only surviving light of the Trees. The Valar ask Fëanor to give them up so that they can restore the Trees. Fëanor replies: "It may be that I can unlock my jewels, but never again shall I make their like; and if I must break them, I shall break my heart." (Note: Tolkien 1977, Chapter 9, "Of the Flight of the Noldor") He refuses to give up the Silmarils of his own free will. Messengers from Formenos tell him that Melkor has killed Finwë and stolen the Silmarils. Yavanna is thus unable to heal the Two Trees.

For this deed, Fëanor names Melkor "Morgoth", "Black Enemy". Fëanor rails against the Great Enemy, blaming the Valar for Morgoth's deeds. He gives a speech in the Elvish city of Tirion, persuading most of his people to return to Middle-earth to avenge Finwë and free themselves from the Valar. Together with his seven sons, they swear the Oath of Fëanor:

They swore an oath which none shall break, and none should take, by the name even of Ilúvatar, calling the Everlasting Dark upon them if they kept it not... ...vowing to pursue with vengeance and hatred to the ends of the World Vala, Demon, Elf or Man as yet unborn or any creature, great or small, good or evil, that time should bring forth unto the end of days, whoso should hold or take or keep a Silmaril from their possession.

=== Return to Beleriand ===
Arda in the First Age. The Elves migrated across Middle-earth; many of them travelled to Valinor (green arrows to the left). Finwë's killing by Melkor led in turn to the Flight of the Noldor (red arrows to the right) back to Beleriand in Middle-earth.

To get to Middle-earth, Fëanor goes to the shores of Aman, and asks the seafaring Teleri for their aid. When they refuse, Fëanor orders the Noldor to steal the ships. The Teleri resist, and many of them are killed. The battle became known as the Kinslaying at Alqualondë, or the first kinslaying. His sons later commit two other acts of warfare against Elves in Middle-earth in his name. In repentance, Finarfin, Finwë's third son, takes his host and turns back. They are accepted by the Valar, and Finarfin rules as High-King of the Noldor in Valinor. The remaining Elves, those who follow Fëanor and Fingolfin, become subject to the Doom of Mandos, that they will come to harm if they continue their rebellion against the Valar. There are not enough ships to carry all the Noldor across the sea, so Fëanor and his sons lead the first group. Upon arriving in the far west of Beleriand, they decide to burn the ships and leave Fingolfin and his people behind. Fingolfin, furious, returns to Beleriand by the long and hard land route, via the northern ice.

Morgoth summons his armies from his fortress of Angband and attacks Fëanor's encampment in Mithrim. This battle was called the Battle under the Stars, or Dagor-nuin-Giliath, for the Sun and Moon had not yet been made. The Noldor win the battle. Fëanor presses on toward Angband with his sons. He comes within sight of Angband, but is ambushed by a force of Balrogs, with few Elves about him. He fights mightily with Gothmog, captain of the Balrogs. His sons come upon the Balrogs with a great force of Elves, and drive them off; but Fëanor knows his wounds are fatal. He curses Morgoth thrice, but with the eyes of death, he sees that his Elves, unaided, will never throw down the dark towers of Thangorodrim.

=== Aftermath ===
The Oath of Fëanor affects the lovers Beren and Lúthien. They steal a Silmaril from Morgoth, leading to Kinslaying and years of strife among the Elves, (Note: Tolkien 1977, Chapter 19, "Of Beren and Lúthien") until Eärendil carries the Silmaril off into the West. (Note: Tolkien 1977, Chapter 24, "Of the Voyage of Eärendil") That Silmaril is lost to the Sons of Fëanor, but the other two remain in the crown of Morgoth. They too are stolen, one ending in the earth, one in the sea.

According to Mandos' prophecy, following Melkor's final return and defeat in the Dagor Dagorath, the world will be changed and the Valar will recover the Silmarils. Fëanor will be released from the Halls of Mandos and will give Yavanna the Silmarils. Fëanor will break them, and Yavanna will revive the Two Trees. The Pelóri Mountains will be flattened and the light of the Two Trees will fill the world in eternal bliss. (Note: Tolkien 1986, ch. 3: "Quenta Noldorinwa") (Note: Tolkien 1994, Part 2, "The Later Quenta Silmarillion", "The Last Chapters of the Quenta Silmarillion")

=== House of Fëanor ===
Mahtan
Nerdanel
Maedhros

Míriel	Finwë of the Noldor	Indis of the Vanyar
Fëanor maker of Silmarils	Findis	Fingolfin	Lalwen	Finarfin
Maglor	Celegorm	Curufin	Caranthir	Amras	Amrod
Celebrimbor maker of Rings

Kings of the Noldor in Valinor

High Kings of the Noldor in Exile (in Middle-earth)

All the characters shown are Elves. The above tree follows the late note The Shibboleth of Fëanor. (Note: Tolkien 1996, "The Shibboleth of Fëanor") In The Silmarillion, the birth order of Fëanor's sons is Maedhros, Maglor, Celegorm, Caranthir, Curufin (father of Celebrimbor), Amrod, and Amras; Fëanor's half-sisters Findis and Lalwen do not appear. (Note: Tolkien 1977, "Of the Rings of Power and the Third Age": Family Tree I: "The house of Finwë and the Noldorin descent of Elrond and Elros")

== Development ==
Fëanor was originally named Curufinwë ("skilful [son of] Finwë") in Tolkien's fictional language of Quenya. He is known as Fëanáro, "spirit of fire" in Quenya, from fëa ("spirit") and nár ("flame"). Fëanáro is his "mother-name" or Amilessë, the name given by an Elf's mother at, or some years after, birth and it was one of their true names. (Note: Tolkien 1996, Chapter 11 "The Shibboleth of Fëanor")

Tolkien wrote at least four versions of the Oath of Fëanor itself, as found in The History of Middle-earth. The three earliest versions are found in The Lays of Beleriand: in alliterative verse (circa 1918–1920s), in chapter 2, "Poems Early Abandoned" The Flight of the Noldoli from Valinor. Lines 132–141; in rhyming couplets (circa 1928), in chapter 3, "The Lay of Leithian". Canto VI, lines 1628–1643; and in a different form as restated by Celegorm, third son of Fëanor, in chapter 3, "The Lay of Leithian." Canto VI, lines 1848–1857. A later version is found in Morgoth's Ring. Fëanor is among those major characters whom Tolkien, who also used to illustrate his writings, supplied with a distinct heraldic device.

== Analysis ==
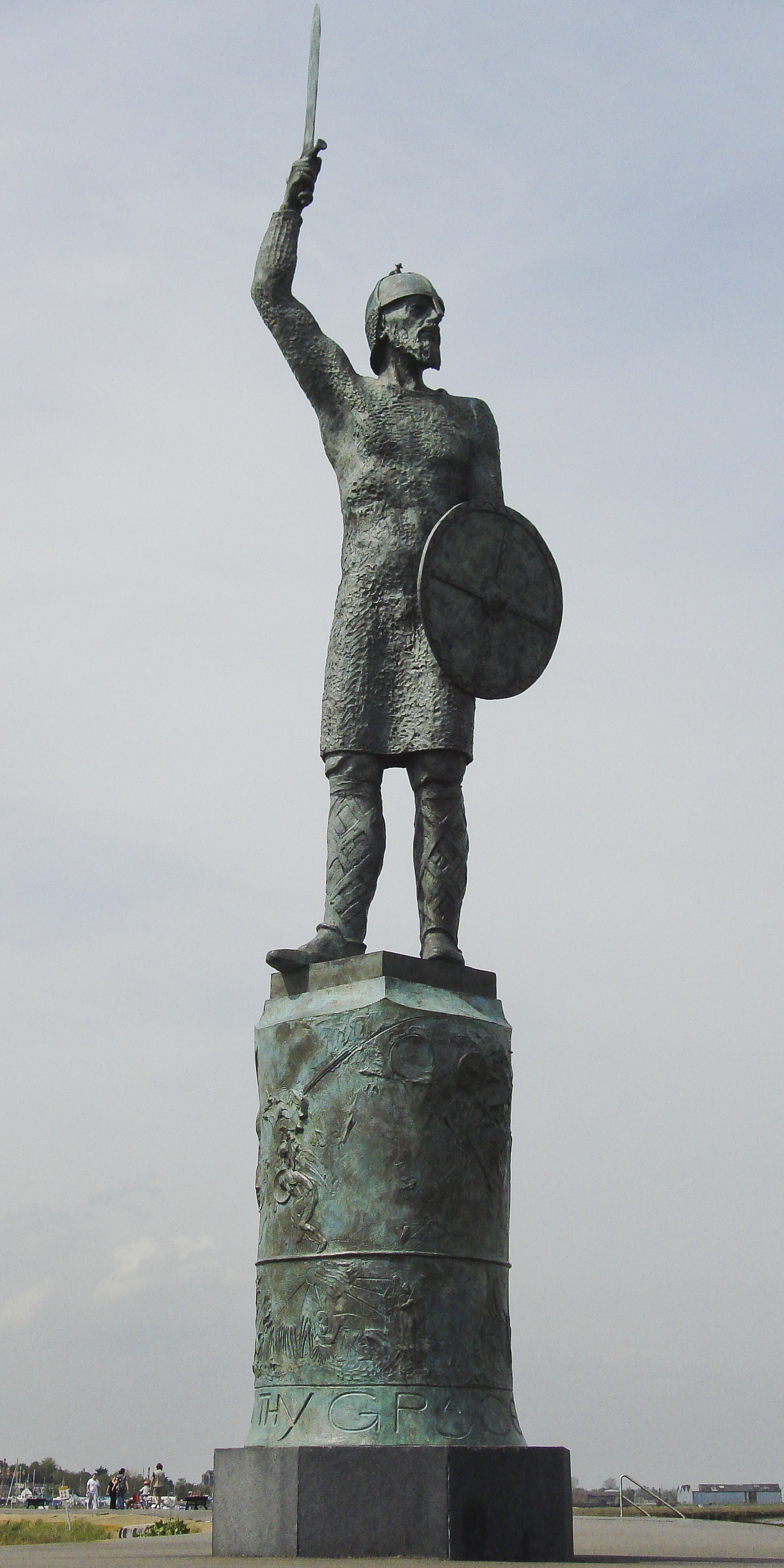
The proud Anglo-Saxon leader Byrhtnoth may have inspired Tolkien to create Fëanor. Statue at Maldon by John Doubleday

=== Pride and downfall ===
The Tolkien scholar Jane Chance sees Morgoth's corruption of Elves and Men as clearly Biblical, as it "mirrors that of Adam and Eve by Satan; the desire for power and godlike being is the same desire for knowledge of good and evil witnessed in the Garden of Eden." She treats the Silmarils as symbols of that same desire. She identifies Fëanor's wish to be like the Valar in creating "things of his own" as rebellious pride, and that, like Melkor, he "succumbs to a 'greedy love'" of his creations that causes his downfall. She points out that Fëanor's rebellion is echoed by that of the Númenórean man Ar-Pharazon, and then at the end of The Silmarillion by the (angelic) Maia, Sauron, who becomes the Dark Lord of The Lord of the Rings.

Jane Chance's comparison of Fëanor and Morgoth with Biblical characters in the Book of Genesis
Tolkien	Bible	Action	Result
Morgoth		corrupts Men, Elves	Exiled, his fortress of Angband destroyed, Beleriand drowned
	Satan	corrupts Adam and Eve	fallen angel
Fëanor		rebellious pride, desire for pride and godlike being, creates the Silmarils	downfall: his death, disaster for his people, ruin of Beleriand
	Adam and Eve	desire for godlike knowledge of good and evil	Fall of man, expelled from Garden of Eden

The philologist Elizabeth Solopova suggests that the character of Fëanor was inspired by the Anglo-Saxon leader Byrhtnoth, and in particular his appearance in the poem "The Battle of Maldon". The poem tells how he is slain in that battle, which took place in the year 991. Tolkien wrote a short play in verse, The Homecoming of Beorhtnoth, Beorhthelm's Son (Note: Tolkien 1966, "The Homecoming of Beorhtnoth, Beorhthelm's Son") on the character's misplaced pride, and described Byrhtnoth as misled by "pride and misplaced chivalry proven fatal" and as "too foolish to be heroic". Fëanor is similarly driven by "overmastering pride" that causes his death and that of countless followers.

=== Pride in sub-creation ===
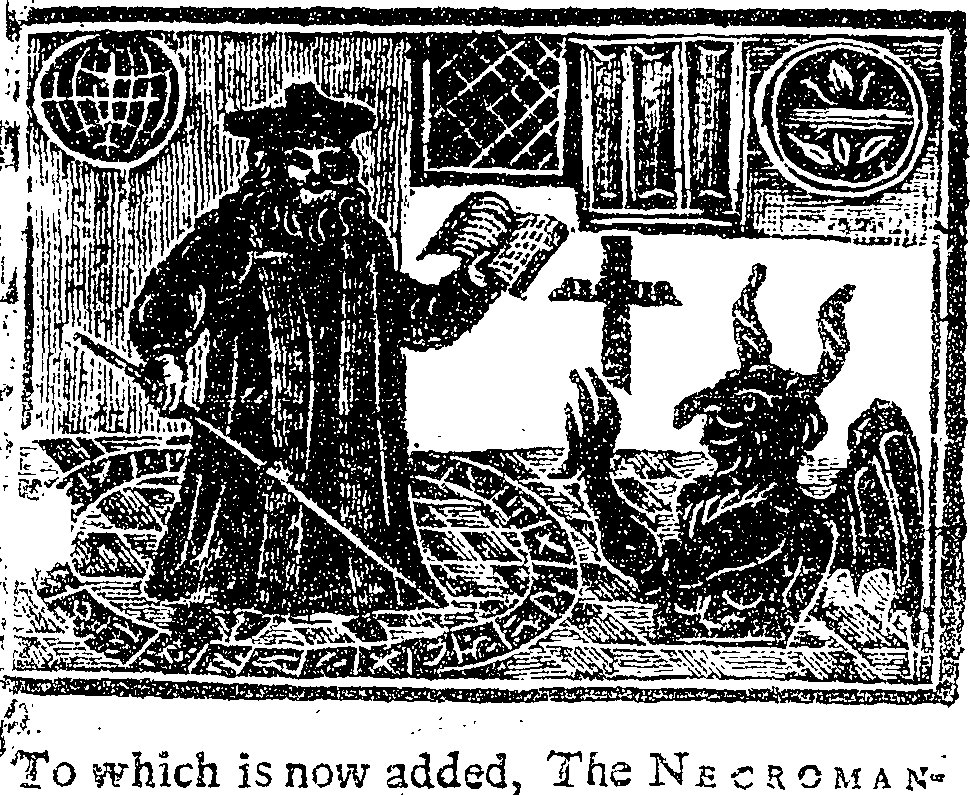
Fëanor's self-destructive pride in his own creation has been likened to that of Thomas Mann's "Doctor Faustus", in the person of the fictional 20th century composer Adrian Leverkühn, a reworking of the Faust legend. 1740 English print of Doctor Faustus's pact with the Devil.

The Tolkien scholar Tom Shippey comments that Fëanor and his Silmarils relate to The Silmarillion's theme in a particular way: the sin of the Elves is not human pride, as in the Biblical fall, but their "desire to make things which will forever reflect or incarnate their own personality". This Elvish form of pride leads Fëanor to forge the Silmarils, and, Shippey suggests, led Tolkien to write his fictions: "Tolkien could not help seeing a part of himself in Fëanor and Saruman, sharing their perhaps licit, perhaps illicit desire to 'sub-create'."

John Ellison, writing in the Tolkien Society's journal Mallorn, draws a comparison between Fëanor and the Faust legend, in particular Thomas Mann's version in his 1947 novel Doctor Faustus. In Ellison's view, the life history of both characters is of "genius corrupted finally into insanity; the creative drive turns on its possessor and destroys him, and with him a good part of the fabric of society." He describes as parallel Mann's depiction of his Faust character Leverkühn in a collapsing Nazi Germany and Tolkien's starting his mythology amidst the collapse of pre-1914 Europe in the First World War. Fëanor is, he writes, not an exact equivalent of Doctor Faustus: he does not make a pact with the devil; but both Fëanor and Leverkühn outgrow their teachers in creative skill. Ellison calls Leverkühn "a Fëanor of our times", and comments that far from being a simple battle of good versus evil, Tolkien's world as seen in Fëanor has "the creative and destructive forces in man's nature ... indivisibly linked; this is the essence of the 'fallen world' in which we live." He adds that Fëanor is central to the whole of Tolkien's legendarium, "the hinge on which the whole great Tale ... turns."

John Ellison's analysis of Fëanor's resemblance to Leverkühn in Thomas Mann's version of the Faust legend
Tolkien's Fëanor	Mann's Leverkühn
"genius corrupted finally into insanity"
"creative drive turns on its possessor and destroys him", and much of society
Tolkien sees England's "green country ruined and despoiled by industrial or commercial development"	Mann sees early 20th century Germany "about to slide into barbarism"

Like Shippey, Ellison relates Fëanor's making of the Silmarils to what he supposes was Tolkien's own belief: that it was "a dangerous and impermissible act" that went beyond what the Creator had intended for the Elves. Further, Ellison suggests that while Fëanor does not directly represent Tolkien, there is something about his action that can be applied to Tolkien's life. Tolkien calls Fëanor "fey"; Ellison notes that Tolkien analysed his own name as tollkühn, with the same meaning. Further, Tolkien seems, Ellison writes, to have felt a conflict between his own "sub-creation" and his Catholic faith.

=== Ancestry as guide to character ===
Shippey and the Tolkien scholar Verlyn Flieger both note that Tolkien intended ancestry to be a guide to character. Shippey writes that The Silmarillion echoes Norse mythology in this belief, and that one perhaps needs to study the family trees to see clearly how it all works:

Tom Shippey's analysis of the effect of ancestry on character
Character	Ancestry	Effect
Fëanor	pure Noldor from both father and mother	Creative, headstrong, selfish
Fëanor's half-brothers Finarfin and Fingolfin	mother (Indis) is of "'senior' race", Vanyar	"Superior" to Fëanor "in restraint and generosity"
Finarfin's children Finrod and Galadriel	mother (Eärwen) is of "junior" race, Teleri	Relatively sympathetic
Fingolfin's children, e.g. Aredhel	"mixed Noldor/Vanyar"	"Reckless"
Fëanor's sons	pure Noldor	Aggressive, unsympathetic

=== "Subtle" and "skilled" ===
Flieger writes that Fëanor's fire drives his creativity, making the beautiful letters of the Fëanorian script, and jewels, including, fatefully, the Silmarils. She comments that Tolkien, choosing his words very carefully, calls Fëanor both "subtle", by etymology from Latin sub-tela, "under the warp (of a weaving)", hence the crosswise weft threads that go against the grain, a dangerous part of the fabric of life; and "skilled", by etymology from Indo-European skel-, "to cut", like the Noldor as a whole tending to cause division among the Elves; and indeed his choices, and the Silmarils, lead to division and war, to the Kinslaying of Elf by Elf, the theft of the Telerin Elves' ships in Aman, and in turn to further disasters across the sea in Beleriand.

Verlyn Flieger's analysis of Tolkien's choice of terms for Fëanor
Tolkien's terms	Etymology	Implications
"subtle"	Latin: sub-tela, "under the warp" of a weaving	A person who goes against the grain, dangerous
"skilled"	Indo-European skel-, "to cut"	A divisive person, one who causes conflict
