= Dry Tree =

Legendary tree

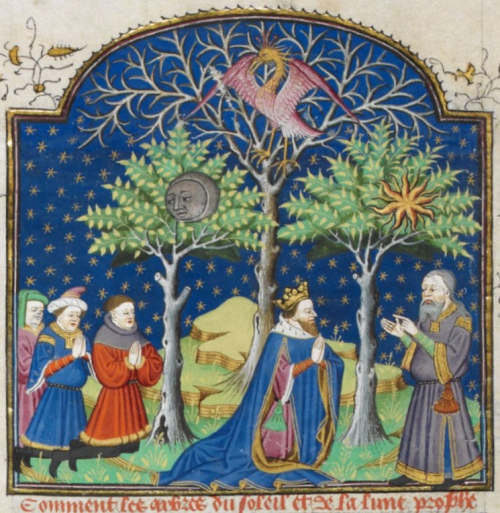
Medieval manuscript illustration of the Dry Tree (centre) with the Phoenix, flanked by the Trees of the Sun and the Moon. Rouen 1444–1445

The Dry Tree (or Tree Solitary) is a legendary tree. It was recorded first by Marco Polo, somewhere in northern Persia. According to Polo, it was the only tree within hundreds of kilometres of desert. According to legend, the Dry Tree marked the exact site of a great battle between Alexander the Great and Darius. It is not known whether this "great battle" refers to the Battle of Issus or the Battle of Gaugamela. The purported location—somewhere in Khorasan, near the border with present day Turkmenistan—is also impossible to ascertain, because Darius had already been assassinated when Alexander reached these regions.

== Overview ==
Marco Polo describes the Dry Tree as a large tree with green leaves on one side and white leaves on the other. For that reason, the Dry tree may have been a plane tree.

The Dry Tree is described by the 14th century Travels of Sir John Mandeville. The tale runs that the Dry Tree has been lifeless since the crucifixion of Christ, but that it will flower afresh when "a prince of the west side of the world should sing a mass beneath it".

Legends of Alexander the Great tell that he found the phoenix, a bird able to bring itself back to life, in the branches of the Dry Tree.

A solitary dry tree is visible on the Issus-mosaic from Pompeii, showing where Alexander met Darius the Great of Persia.

The Dry Tree was reported by the Bavarian adventurer Johannes Schiltberger (1380..c1440), who compared it to the Oak of Mamre. He said that Muslims called this tree "Kurrutherek" or "Sirpe". This last word is close to the Turco-Persian word meaning "cyperus". The Spanish ambassador Ruy Gonzáles de Clavijo said that the tree was in Tabriz.

== Real-world parallels ==
Although the story is a legend, solitary trees do exist. The Tree of Ténéré was such an isolated tree in the West-African state of Niger, serving as a landmark; the nearest tree to it was said to be 400 km away. The tree was knocked down in 1973 by a truck driver.

== Legacy ==
Coat of arms bearing the white tree of Gondor, likened to the Dry Tree.

"The Dry Tree" appears in The Well at the World's End by William Morris. It stands alone in a desert, surrounded by a pool of poisoned water and the bodies and skeletons of those who were thirsty and could not resist drinking the water.

In J. R. R. Tolkien's The Lord of the Rings, the symbol of the Kingdom of Gondor is a White Tree. It stands in the Court of the Fountain at the top of the city of Minas Tirith, dry and lifeless throughout the centuries that Gondor was ruled by the Stewards. It has been likened to the Dry Tree, since a sapling of the White Tree is found and brought into the city by the returning King, Aragorn.

== See also ==
- List of individual trees
