= Silmarils =

Magical jewels central to Tolkien's mythology

"The Silmarils" illustration by J.R.R. Tolkien. Text below the original illustration reads "Ancient Emblem representing the derivation of the Silmarils from the Light of the Trees upon Ezellohar"

The Silmarils (Quenya in-universe pl. Silmarilli [sil.maˈril.li], lit. 'radiance of pure light') (Note: Tolkien, J. R. R., "Addenda and Corrigenda to the Etymologies — Part Two" (edited by Carl F. Hostetter and Patrick H. Wynne), in Vinyar Tengwar, 46, July 2004, p. 11) are three fictional brilliant jewels in J. R. R. Tolkien's legendarium, made by the Elf Fëanor, capturing the pure light of the Two Trees of Valinor. The Silmarils play a central role in Tolkien's book The Silmarillion, which tells of the creation of Eä (the universe) and the beginning of Elves, Dwarves and Men.

Tolkien, a philologist, derived the idea of Silmarils, jewels that actually contained light, from the Old English word Siġelwara; he concluded that Siġel meant both 'sun' and 'jewel'. Scholars have remarked on their similarities to the Sampo in the Kalevala and to the Holy Grail of Arthurian legend. They have described the Silmarils as embodying Elvish pride in their own creation, or a Biblical desire for knowledge of good and evil, as in the Genesis story of the Garden of Eden. Verlyn Flieger analyzes The Silmarillion as a story of splintering of the created light, which in her view Tolkien equates with God. The light is embodied first in two great lamps atop tall pillars to light Middle-earth. When these are destroyed, the light is held in the Two Trees of Valinor, and Fëanor crafts the Silmarils using their light. When the trees are killed, the last available splinters of the created light in Middle-earth are the Silmarils. When the Silmarils are scattered, to Earth, Sea, and Sky, the skyborne one becomes Eärendil's Star. The Elf-lady Galadriel collects light from the star and captures a little of it in the Phial of Galadriel, which enables the Hobbit protagonists of The Lord of the Rings to fulfil their quest.

== Fictional history ==
=== Creation of the Silmarils ===
Maglor casts a Silmaril into the Sea by Ted Nasmith, 1997. The painting was used on the front cover of HarperCollins's illustrated edition of The Silmarillion in 1999.

J. R. R. Tolkien describes the history of the Silmarils in The Silmarillion, published after but in fiction long preceding the events of The Lord of the Rings. The Silmarils—"the most renowned of all the works of the Elves"—are created by Fëanor, a prince of the most skilful clan of Elves, the Noldor, from the light of the Two Trees of Valinor. The Silmarils are made of the crystalline substance silima. The Silmarils are hallowed by the Vala Varda, who kindled the first stars, so that they would burn the hands of any evil creature or mortal who touched them without just cause. (Note: Tolkien 1977, Chapter 7, "Of the Silmarils and the Unrest of the Noldor")

Together with the evil spider Ungoliant, the rebellious Vala Melkor destroys the Two Trees of Valinor. (Note: Tolkien 1977, Chapter 8, "Of the Darkening of Valinor") Later, at the healing effort of the Valar, one of the trees bears a silver flower, and the other bears a golden fruit, just before they die. These are sent to the sky, and became the Sun and the Moon, to illuminate Middle-earth against Melkor. But neither sphere radiates the original light of the trees, free of Ungoliant's poison. (Note: Tolkien 1977, Chapter 11, "Of the Sun and Moon and the Hiding of Valinor") The Silmarils then contain all the remaining unmarred light of the Two Trees. Therefore, the Valar entreat Fëanor to give them up so they can restore the Trees, but he refuses. Then news comes that Melkor has killed Fëanor's father Finwë, the High King of the Noldor, and stolen the Silmarils. After this deed, Melkor flees from Valinor to his fortress Angband in the north of Middle-earth. Thereafter he wears the Silmarils in his Iron Crown. (Note: Tolkien 1977, Chapter 9, "Of the Flight of the Noldor")

=== War over the Silmarils ===
Fëanor is furious at Melkor, whom he names Morgoth, "Dark Enemy of the World", and at the Valar's desire to take the gems for their own purposes. Together with his seven sons he swears the Oath of Fëanor, which binds them to fight anyone who withholds the Silmarils from them. This terrible oath results in much future trouble including mass murder and the war of Elf against Elf. Fëanor leads many of the Noldor back to Middle-earth. His flight, during the First Age of Middle-earth, leads to unending grief for the Elves and eventually for the Men of Middle-earth. Five major battles are fought in Beleriand, but ultimately the Noldor and all the people who took the oath fail in their attempt to regain the Silmarils from Morgoth. (Note: Tolkien 1977, Chapter 13, "Of the Return of the Noldor") (Note: Tolkien 1977, Chapter 18, "Of the Ruin of Beleriand") (Note: Tolkien 1977, Chapter 20, "Of the Fifth Battle: Nirnaeth Arnoediad")

=== Fates of the Silmarils ===
Fates of the Silmarils: as Mandos had foretold, (Note: "Mandos foretold that the fates of Arda, earth, sea, and air, lay locked within [the Silmarils]".) they are scattered, one in the sky, one in the earth, one in the sea. (Note: Tolkien 1977, Chapter 24, "Of the Voyage of Eärendil")

One of the Silmarils is recovered by Beren and Lúthien through great peril and loss, when Lúthien, with her singing, sends Morgoth to sleep and Beren cuts it from his crown. The werewolf Carcharoth attacks them as they leave Angband and swallows Beren's hand containing the Silmaril; this drives Carcharoth mad. He is killed by Huan the Hound, who dies from his wounds, and the Elf-captain Mablung cuts the Silmaril out. (Note: Tolkien 1977, Chapter 19, "Of Beren and Lúthien") It is taken to the Valar in the West by Eärendil, heir of Beren and Lúthien, as a token of repentance for Fëanor's rebellion. The Valar then set this Silmaril as a star in the sky: it is fixed to the mast of Eärendil's ship, forever sailing across the sky. The other two gems remain in Morgoth's hands, until they are taken from him by a servant of the Vala Manwë at the end of the War of Wrath. However, soon afterwards, they are stolen by Fëanor's two remaining sons, Maedhros and Maglor, as they try to fulfil the oath they had sworn so many years before. But the jewels burn their hands, in denial of their rights of possession, as they had burned Morgoth's hands before. In agony, Maedhros throws himself and his Silmaril into a fiery pit, and Maglor throws his Silmaril into the sea. Thus the Silmarils remain in the sea, the earth, and the sky—their light present but inaccessible to those in Middle-earth.

According to a prophecy of Mandos, following Melkor's final return and defeat in the Dagor Dagorath (Battle of Battles), the world will be changed and the Silmarils will be recovered by the Valar. Then Fëanor will be released from the Halls of Mandos, and he will give Yavanna the Silmarils. She will break them, and with their light she will revive the Two Trees. The Pelóri Mountains will be flattened, and the light of the Two Trees will fill the world in eternal bliss. (Note: Tolkien 1986, ch. 3: "Quenta Noldorinwa") (Note: Tolkien 1994, Part 2, "The Later Quenta Silmarillion", "The Last Chapters of the Quenta Silmarillion")

== Origins ==
=== Sigelwara ===
Imagemap with clickable links. Tolkien's Sigelwara etymologies, leading to major strands of his Legendarium including the Silmarils, Balrogs, and the Haradrim. (Note: Tolkien, J. R. R., "Sigelwara Land" Medium Aevum Vol. 1, No. 3. December 1932 and Medium Aevum Vol. 3, No. 2. June 1934.)

The idea of the Silmaril is connected to Tolkien's philological exploration of the Old English word Siġelwara, which was used in the Old English Codex Junius to mean "Aethiopian". Tolkien wondered why the Anglo-Saxons should have had a word with this meaning, and conjectured that it had once meant something else, which he explored in his essay "Sigelwara Land".

He stated that Siġel meant "both sun and jewel", the former as it was the name of the Sun rune *sowilō (ᛋ), the latter from Latin sigillum, a seal. He decided that Sigelwara's second component, Hearwa, was related to Old English heorð, "hearth", and ultimately to Latin carbō, "soot". He suggested this implied a class of demons "with red-hot eyes that emitted sparks and faces black as soot". The Tolkien scholar Tom Shippey states that this contributed to the sun-jewel Silmarils, and "helped to naturalise the Balrog" (a demon of fire). The Aethiopians suggested to Tolkien the Haradrim, a dark southern race of men. (Note: Tolkien 1989, ch. 35 p. 435 & p. 439 note 4)

=== Sampo ===
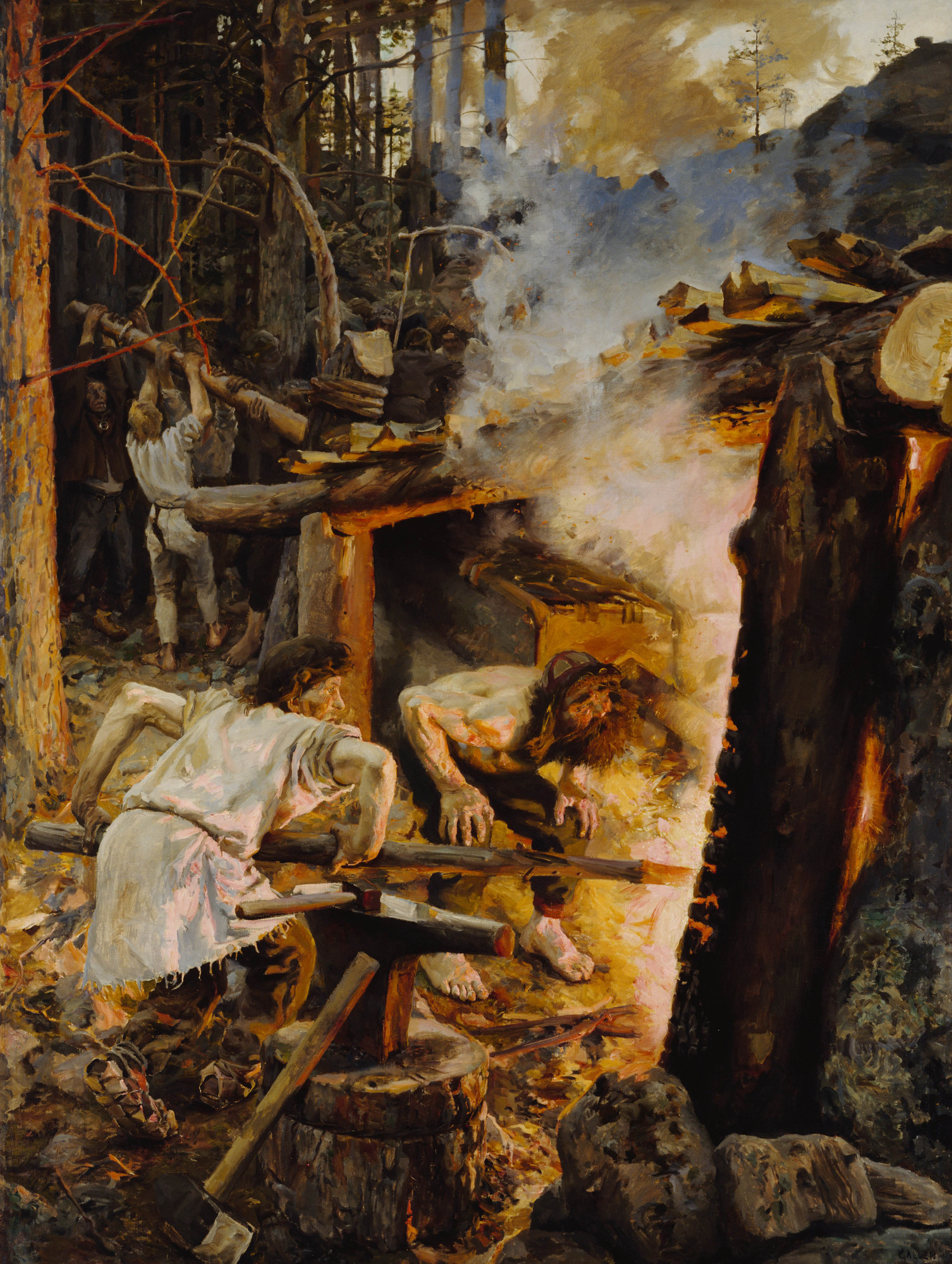
The Forging of the Sampo, Akseli Gallen-Kallela, 1893

Another likely origin is the Sampo in Elias Lönnrot's 1849 Kalevala, a text that Tolkien studied with interest, thinking to use it in a story in 1914. The Tolkien scholar Jonathan B. Himes states that the Sampo is the "central mythic object" in the Kalevala; it gave its owner "socio-economic supremacy". He suggests that Tolkien reworked this into "the world war among all races of Middle-earth for the moral and terrestrial stability offered by the Silmarils". He adds that Tolkien's approach was to present moral conflicts and medieval pagan thought plainly; to fill in gaps from other sources; and to make the scale global. Tolkien's goal was to create a mythology through "feigned history". Lönnrot's account of the Sampo is vague, leading scholars to speculate as to its nature. One view is that it was "a world pillar which grinds like a gigantic mill under the 'decorated lid' of the sky." Himes comments that Tolkien wanted something more comprehensible, so he chose to split the Sampo's parts into desirable objects. The pillar became the Two Trees of Valinor with their Tree of life aspect, illuminating the world. The decorated lid became the brilliant Silmarils, which embodied all that was left of the light of the two Trees, thus tying the symbols together.

The scholar of mythology and medieval literature Verlyn Flieger writes that the similarities between the Sampo and the Silmarils are "obvious". She states that in both cases, the fates of the objects are "clear but their significance is ill-defined"; in particular, their "medium (light) is not congruent with the message (greed and possessiveness)." She adds that the Silmarils share attributes with the Holy Grail of Arthurian legend, being the "symbolic centre" of their story, having a "mystical dimension", being called "holy", and being the objects of "a life-changing quest". Unlike the Sampo, which brings wealth, the Silmarils bring pain, misfortune, and death, in her view contradicting their light-filled nature.

== Analysis ==
=== Creative pride ===
Shippey comments that the Silmarils relate to the book's theme in a particular way: the sin of the Elves is not human pride, as in the Biblical fall, but their "desire to make things which will forever reflect or incarnate their own personality". This Elvish form of pride leads Fëanor to forge the Silmarils, and, Shippey suggests, led Tolkien to write his fictions: "Tolkien could not help seeing a part of himself in Fëanor and Saruman, sharing their perhaps licit, perhaps illicit desire to 'sub-create'."

The critic Jane Chance views the Silmarils as "created things misused by their creators", like indeed the One Ring in The Lord of the Rings; and like it, they give their name to their book and help "to unify the entire mythology". She sees the theme as straightforwardly Biblical, the Silmarils symbolising "the same desire for knowledge of good and evil witnessed in the Garden of Eden."

=== Splintered light ===
Flieger states in her book Splintered Light: Logos and Language in Tolkien's World that Tolkien equates light with God and the ability to create. In her view, the whole of The Silmarillion can be seen as a working-out of the theme of Man splintering the original white light of creation, resulting in many conflicts.

Verlyn Flieger's analysis of the splintering of the Created Light, with repeated re-creations
Age	Light	Jewels
Years of the Lamps	Illuin and Ormal atop tall pillars	
ending when Melkor destroys both Lamps
Years of the Trees (First Age)	Two Trees of Valinor, giving light to Aman	Fëanor crafts 3 Silmarils with light of the Two Trees.
ending when Melkor strikes the Two Trees, and the giant spider Ungoliant kills them
First Age (Years of the Sun)	Last flower and fruit of the Two Trees become the Moon and the Sun.	There is war over the Silmarils.
First Age (Years of the Sun)		One Silmaril is buried in the Earth, one is lost in the Sea, one sails in the Sky as Eärendil's Star.
Third Age		Galadriel collects light of Eärendil's Star reflected in her fountain mirror.
Third Age		A little of that light is captured in the Phial of Galadriel.
Third Age		Hobbits Frodo Baggins and Sam Gamgee use the Phial to defeat the giant spider Shelob.

The light begins in The Silmarillion as a unity, and is divided into more and more fragments as the myth progresses. Middle-earth is peopled by the angelic Valar and lit by two great lamps; when these are destroyed by the fallen Vala Melkor, the world is fragmented, and the Valar retreat to Valinor, which is lit by The Two Trees. When these too are destroyed, their last fragment of light is made into the Silmarils, and a sapling too is rescued, leading to the White Tree of Númenor, the living symbol of the Kingdom of Gondor. Wars are fought over the Silmarils, and they are lost to the Earth, the Sea, and the Sky, the last of these, carried by Eärendil the Mariner, becoming the Morning Star. Some of the star's light is captured in Galadriel's Mirror, the magic fountain that allows her to see past, present, and future; and some of that light is, finally, trapped in the Phial of Galadriel, her parting gift to Frodo, protagonist in The Lord of the Rings, to counterbalance Sauron's evil and powerful Ring that he also carries. At each stage, the fragmentation increases and the power decreases, echoing Tolkien's theme of decline and fall in Middle-earth.

=== Jungian mandala of the self ===
The Jungian analyst and author Pia Skogemann interprets the three Silmarils and their fiery maker Fëanor as a mandala of the self, one of several such mandalas which she sees in Tolkien's Middle-earth writings. The three Silmarils end up in the sky, the sea, and the earth, symbolising the elements of air, water, and earth; the Silmarils' unruly creator Fëanor completes the mandala as the element of fire.

Pia Skogemann's interpretation of elements of The Silmarillion as a Jungian mandala of the Self

Jungian mandala of the self, with the four classical elements represented by the Sky, the Sea, and the Earth – the final resting-places of the three Silmarils – the mandala completed with Fire for the creative but unruly Elf Fëanor

== See also ==
- Rings of Power
