= Decline =

Decline may refer to:

- Decadence, involves a perceived decay in standards, morals, dignity, religious faith, or skill over time
- in marketing, the stage in the product life cycle when demand for a product begins to taper off
- "Decline" (song), 2017 song by Raye and Mr Eazi
- "Decline" (Brass Eye), a 1997 television episode
- The Decline (EP), an EP by NOFX
- The Decline (band), Australian skate punk band from Perth
- The Decline (film), a 2020 Canadian thriller drama film

== See also ==
- Declension, the way words decline
- Declination (disambiguation)
- Declinism
- Decline and Fall (disambiguation)
- Decline of the Roman Empire
- Decline of Detroit
- Ottoman decline thesis
- The Decline of the West by Oswald Spengler
- Social disintegration,
- Societal collapse
- Underground hard-rock mining
- Withering away of the state
