= Matthew T. Dickerson =

American computer scientist and Tolkien scholar

Matthew Dickerson

Academic background
- Education: Dartmouth College (AB); Cornell University (PhD)

Academic work
- Discipline: Computer science; Literature; History of music
- Sub-discipline: Computer algebra; Computational geometry; Fantasy literature; J. R. R. Tolkien
- Institutions: Middlebury College

Matthew T. Dickerson is an American academic working as a professor of computer science at Middlebury College in Vermont. A scholar of J. R. R. Tolkien's literary work and the Inklings, Dickerson is by his own account a novelist, newspaper columnist, blues musician, historian of music, fly fisherman, maple sugar farmer, and beekeeper.

== Education ==
Dickerson received an A.B. from Dartmouth College in 1985 and a Ph.D. in computer science from Cornell University, under the supervision of Dexter Kozen, in 1989. His Ph.D. research was in symbolic computation, but since then he has worked primarily in computational geometry; his most frequently cited computer science papers concern k-nearest neighbors algorithm and minimum-weight triangulation. Dickerson has been on the Middlebury College faculty since receiving his Ph.D.

== Career ==
From 1997 to 2001, Dickerson published a biweekly column on fishing and the outdoors in the Addison Independent, a local newspaper. Since 2002, he has been the director of the New England Young Writers Conference, an annual four-day conference for high school students in Bread Loaf, Vermont, that is associated with Middlebury College. He is also the founding director of the Vermont Conference on Christianity and the Arts. He plays bass in a Vermont-based blues band, Deep Freyed.

=== Tolkien scholarship ===
Dickerson is the author of six non-technical books, most of them about fantasy fiction. His 2003 book Following Gandalf: Epic Battles and Moral Victory in The Lord of the Rings, a study of the moral and Christian values expressed by Tolkien's works, highlights the contrasts between moral and physical victories, and between heroism and violence; it points out the necessity of having free will in order to make moral choices. It was shortlisted for the Mythopoeic Society's 2004 and 2005 Mythopoeic Scholarship Awards. He has written a pair of books on Tolkien, C. S. Lewis, and environmentalism, Ents, Elves, and Eriador: The Environmental Vision of J.R.R. Tolkien and Narnia and the Fields of Arbol: The Environmental Vision of C. S. Lewis. Despite giving the first of these two books an overall negative review, reviewer Patrick Curry writes that it is "a major new contribution to the subject of Tolkien's work".

=== Other books ===
His other books include The Finnsburg Encounter. a work of historical fiction, translated into German as Licht uber Friesland, Hammers and Nails: The Life and Music of Mark Heard, a biography of musician Mark Heard, and From Homer to Harry Potter: A Handbook on Myth and Fantasy.
