= Trees of the Sun and the Moon =

The Trees of the Sun and the Moon are two legendary trees associated with Alexander the Great. The earliest known account of the trees is found in the apocryphal Letter of Alexander to Aristotle, where it takes up about a quarter of the text.

The Tree of the Sun is male and that of the Moon female. They foretell the future in Greek and Indian languages. In response to Alexander's queries, they tell him that he will become lord of the world, but also that he will die by poisoning in Babylon the next year. His mother will die miserably, but his sister will have a happy life.

The trees are depicted on the Ebstorf map, the Psalter world map, the Jerome map and the map in the Liber Floridus.

== See also ==
- Two Trees of Valinor#Trees of Sun and Moon
