= Ungoliant =

Fictional character in J.R.R. Tolkien's Middle-earth

Ungoliant (Sindarin pronunciation: [ʊŋˈɡɔljant]) is a fictional character in J. R. R. Tolkien's legendarium, described as an evil spirit in the form of a giant spider. Her name means "dark spider" in Sindarin. She is mentioned briefly in The Lord of the Rings, and plays a supporting role in The Silmarillion, enabling the Dark Lord Melkor to destroy the Two Trees of Valinor and darken the world.

Her origins are unclear, as Tolkien's writings do not explicitly reveal her nature, other than that she is from "before the world"; this may mean she is a Maia, an immortal spirit. Scholars have likened the story of Ungoliant and Melkor to John Milton's Paradise Lost, where Sin conceives a child, Death, by Satan: Sin and Death are always hungry. There are limited parallels in Norse myth: while there are female giants, they are not usually spiders, though the Devil appears as a spider in an early Icelandic tale, and a female giant in the Prose Edda is named Nótt ("Night"), she and her brood dwelling in and personifying darkness.

== Etymology ==
Ungoliant means 'dark spider' in Tolkien's fictional language of Sindarin. It is a loan word from Quenya: Ungwë liantë [ˈuŋwɛ liˈantɛ]. In early versions, recorded in Morgoth's Ring, Tolkien writes Ungoliantë. (Note: Tolkien 1993, e.g. pp.98–101, 108–109, 283–289)

== Internal history ==
In the Years of the Trees, Arda was lit by the Two Trees of Valinor. Melkor damaged the trees, and Ungoliant drained them of their sap (Note: Tolkien 1977, ch. 8 "Of the Darkening of Valinor")

Tolkien's original writings say that Ungoliant was a primeval spirit of night, named Móru, (Note: Tolkien 1984, ch. 6 "The Theft of Melko") who aided Melkor in his attack upon the Two Trees of Valinor, draining them of their sap after Melkor had injured them. She also consumed the reserves of light from the wells of Varda. Afterward the light of the trees persisted only within the Silmarils of Fëanor. Ungoliant helped Melkor evade the Valar by shrouding them both in the impenetrable darkness she produced.

Melkor had promised Ungoliant to yield anything she wished in return for her aid, but betrayed this promise by withholding the Silmarils, and summoned the Balrogs to repel her. (Note: Tolkien 1977, ch. 9 "Of the Flight of the Noldor") Ungoliant fled to the Ered Gorgoroth in Beleriand. At some point she gave birth to the Giant Spiders, including the character Shelob of The Lord of the Rings. In The Silmarillion, it is stated that when she went into hiding her hunger was such that she would mate with other spiders only to devour them later, with her offspring used as food once fully grown. The Silmarillion suggests that Ungoliant's unremitting hunger may perhaps have driven her to devour herself.

== Analysis ==
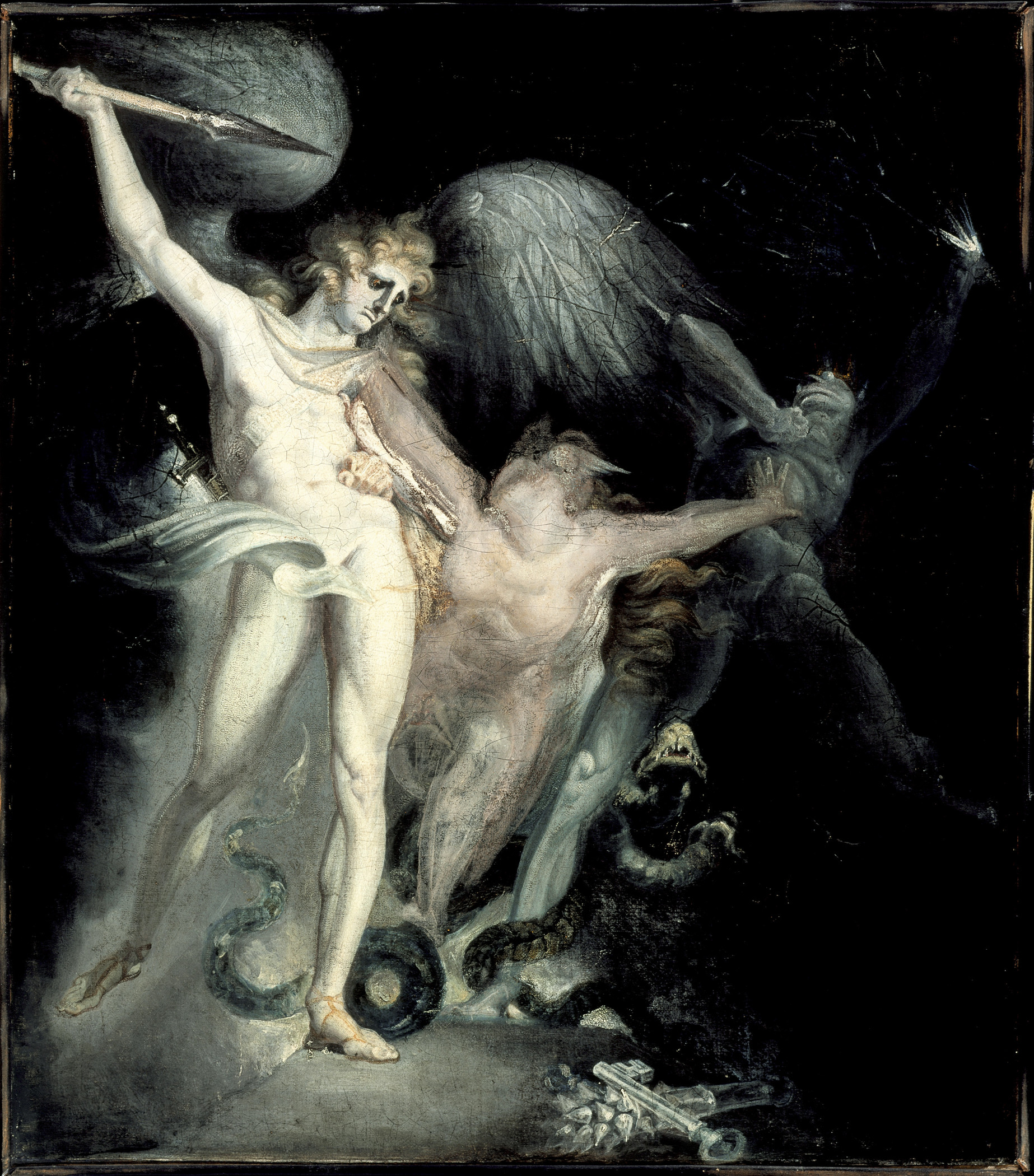
The story of Ungoliant and Morgoth has been likened to Milton's Paradise Lost, where Death is the ever-hungry child of Satan. Painting of Satan, Sin, and Death by Henry Fuseli, 1800

According to the Tolkien scholar John Wm. Houghton, the story of Ungoliant and Morgoth is comparable to the account in John Milton's Paradise Lost in which Sin conceives a child, Death, by Satan. Both Sin and Death are always hungry; Satan says he will feed them, and leads them to the world.

Joe Abbott, writing in Mythlore, comments that Ungoliant and Shelob are similar monsters, "product of a singular concept". He observes that they are female giants, something found in Northern folklore. Those are not usually in spider form, but he notes an early Icelandic example where "the Devil appears as a spider and has his leg cut off". On Ungoliant's race, he notes Tolkien's remark in The Theft of Melko (in The Book of Lost Tales) that "Mayhap she was bred of mists and darkness on the confines of the Shadowy seas, in the utter dark that came between the overthrow of the Lamps and the kindling of the Trees, but more like she has always been [Abbott's italics]; and she it is who loveth still to dwell in that black place taking the guise of an unlovely spider." He draws attention to Tolkien's suggestions that Ungoliant has always existed and that she is simply choosing to appear (in the "guise") as a spider, and states that this means she must be an immortal Maia, a spirit-being able to take on physical form. He offers the parallel of Nott ("Night"), an Icelandic female giant in the "Gilfaginning" in the Prose Edda of Snorri Sturluson. Nott was dark, like all her kindred, just as Ungoliant and all her brood dwell in and "personify" darkness.

In Mythlore, Candice Fredrick and Sam McBride write that Ungoliant and the lesser spider Shelob signify purely irrational evil, "wholly preoccupied with their own lusts; they operate on the pleasure principle." They contrast this with the Dark Lords Melkor and Sauron, who, while also wholly evil, possess the power of rational thought, "evil guided by rationality". Thus, Melkor can think long-term, exploiting other beings to achieve his goals, whereas Ungoliant chooses "instant gratification". They further assert that the spiders' irrationality required Tolkien to make them female, while the Dark Lords' analytical thought identified them as male.

In a version of Of the Darkening of Valinor written after The Lord of the Rings, and not included in The Silmarillion, Tolkien added that "[Ungoliantë] would not dare the perils of Aman, or the power of the dreadful Lords, without a great reward; for she feared the eyes of Manwë and Varda more even than the wrath of Melkor." (Note: Tolkien 1993, "Of the Darkening of Valinor" (p. 285)) Kristine Larsen, in Mallorn, comments that this mention of Varda's power over the great spider is unique.

== Legacy ==
The Dark Lord Morgoth facing Ungoliant, fan art

Ungoliant has been the subject of several heavy metal music songs. Her conflict with Morgoth over the Silmaril was the subject of Blind Guardian's song "Into the Storm", from their 1998 album Nightfall in Middle-Earth. Austrian black metal band Summoning had a song called "Ungolianth" on their 1995 album Minas Morgul. On their 2006 album The Morrigan's Call, the Irish Celtic metal band Cruachan featured a song called "Ungoliant", as well as one named after Shelob.

Ungoliant is mentioned in the 2012 film The Hobbit: An Unexpected Journey, the first film of Peter Jackson's film trilogy of The Hobbit, when the wizard Radagast the Brown conjectures on the origin of malevolent giant spiders endemic to Mirkwood.
