= Thranduil =

Fictional elf in Tolkien's Middle-Earth

- Middle-earth character

In-universe information
- Race: Elf (Sindar)
- Title: Elvenking of Mirkwood
- Book(s): The Hobbit (1937); The Lord of the Rings (1954–1955); The Silmarillion (1977); Unfinished Tales (1980)

Thranduil is a fictional character in J. R. R. Tolkien's Middle-earth legendarium. He first appears as a supporting character in The Hobbit, where he is simply known as the Elvenking, the ruler of the Elves who lived in the woodland realm of Mirkwood. The character is properly named in Tolkien's The Lord of the Rings, and appears briefly in The Silmarillion and Unfinished Tales.

The character has appeared in adaptations of The Hobbit in other media. The 2010s film adaptations of The Hobbit expands the character's role within the narrative, using information from Tolkien's later works about the character and original material by the filmmakers. Thranduil is portrayed by the American actor Lee Pace; he has been well received by fans and critics.

== Development ==
Sketch map of Northeast Mirkwood in the Third Age, showing the Elvenking's Halls, the Lonely Mountain of Erebor, and Esgaroth upon the Long Lake

Thranduil is one of the Sindar or Grey Elves who speak Sindarin as opposed to Quenya, the language spoken by Noldorin Elves like Galadriel. The name "Thranduil" means "vigorous spring" in Sindarin. (Note: Tolkien 1996, II": "The Appendix on Languages", Languages at the end of the Third Age) Following the end of the First Age and the destruction of much of Beleriand during the War of Wrath, many Sindar migrate into the east of Middle-earth. Crossing the Misty Mountains, they found populations of Silvan Elves living in the woodlands that bordered the River Anduin. The Sindar were welcomed by these people, and some were made leaders and rulers over them. In Appendix B of The Lord of the Rings Tolkien states that Thranduil was one of the Sindar who migrated eastward early in the Second Age and established kingdoms among the Silvan Elves. (Note: Tolkien 1955, Appendix B) Later writings in Unfinished Tales make Thranduil's father Oropher the founder of the realm, which originally included the southern portions of the forest of Greenwood the Great, later known as Mirkwood. (Note: Tolkien 1980, "The History of Galadriel and Celeborn", "Appendix B: The Sindarin Princes of the Silvan Elves")

Tolkien described Thranduil in The Hobbit as having "golden hair" with a crown made of red leaves and berries in the autumn, and wearing a similar crown of flowers in the spring. (Note: Tolkien 1937, ch. 8 "Flies and Spiders")

== Biography ==
Thranduil marched with his father and a large army of their people to join the Last Alliance of Elves and Men in their war against Sauron at the end of the Second Age. The Elves suffered serious losses, including Oropher, who was killed in the Battle of Dagorlad before the Black Gate of Mordor. Following the war, Thranduil, now king of his people, led the remnants of his army, only a third of what had set out, back to their woodland home in Mirkwood. (Note: Tolkien 1980, p. 335.) Hearing word of the Disaster of the Gladden Fields shortly after their return, Thranduil set out to aid the Dúnedain; he arrived too late to save them, but was able to finish the destruction of the Orc horde and prevent the mutilation of the dead. (Note: Tolkien 1980, p. 276.)

During the Third Age, Thranduil led his people to the north-east corner of the forest and there created an underground fortress and series of great halls. He was inspired in this enterprise by Thingol's halls of Menegroth in Doriath during the First Age, and like Thingol, he used the skill of the Dwarves to aid in making his stronghold. (Note: Tolkien 1954 Book 1, ch. 8 "The Road to Isengard")

Being far in the north, and on the eastern edge of an increasingly perilous Mirkwood, Thranduil's realm was somewhat isolated, but he traded with the Dwarves and Men who lived nearby in Erebor, Dale, and Esgaroth (Laketown). An attack by the dragon Smaug destroyed Erebor and Dale, and reduced Esgaroth to a shell of its former self, (Note: Tolkien 1937, ch. 1 "An Unexpected Party") though there remained a healthy wine trade between the lake and the wood. (Note: Tolkien 1937, ch. 9 "Barrels out of Bond") This situation changed with the arrival of Bilbo Baggins and a company of Dwarves, on their quest to reclaim Erebor. The Dwarves were captured by Thranduil's guards and, suspicious of their intentions, he had them locked in his dungeons from which they later escaped inside barrels.

In a great hall with pillars hewn out of the living stone sat the Elvenking on a chair of carven wood. On his head was a crown of berries and red leaves, for the autumn was come again. In the spring he wore a crown of woodland flowers. In his hand he held a carven staff of oak. – The Hobbit: "Barrels out of Bond"

After the death of Smaug, Thranduil along with the people of Esgaroth demanded a share of the treasure of Erebor, beginning a confrontation with Thorin's company, who were reinforced by an army from the Iron Hills, that nearly led to war. War with the Dwarves was averted by the intervention of the wizard Gandalf upon the arrival of the allied forces of Orcs and wargs. The combined army of Elves, Dwarves, and Men was victorious in the ensuing Battle of the Five Armies, but at great cost of life. (Note: Tolkien 1937, ch. 17 "The Clouds Burst")

During the events of the War of the Ring as depicted in the Lord of the Rings, Thranduil does what he can to aid his allies, including holding the creature Gollum in his dungeons for interrogation by Gandalf on the history of the One Ring. Gollum later escapes with the aid of Orcs who attack Thranduil's realm, and his son Legolas is sent to Rivendell to seek the counsel of Elrond and Gandalf. (Note: Tolkien 1954a, book 2, ch. 2 "The Council of Elrond") Thranduil and his people withstood attacks by Sauron's forces during northern battles of the war. Having routed their foes in the north, Thranduil's forces moved south, and joined with the armies of Lorien under Celeborn and Galadriel in destroying Dol Guldur, cleansing Mirkwood of Sauron's taint of evil. In the aftermath, Thranduil, along with Celeborn, renamed Mirkwood Eryn Lasgalen, The Wood of Greenleaves. Thranduil's realm expands after the wars, and he and his people enjoyed peace.

== Adaptations ==
=== The Hobbit film series ===
Lee Pace gave a critically acclaimed performance as Thranduil in The Hobbit film trilogy.

Peter Jackson cast Lee Pace for his 2012–2014 film trilogy The Hobbit, stating that Pace had been the filmmakers' favourite for the part after his performance in the 2006 film The Fall.

The New Zealand screenwriter and film producer Philippa Boyens, a co-writer of the screenplay for The Hobbit, noted that Tolkien only revealed further detailed information about the character, including his name and backstory, in the book's sequel. Boyens suggested that there was "a lot more story" behind Thranduil, and that he was an interesting character in terms of what they had to make up or expand as part of the films' storytelling as there is not a lot of information present in the original source material.

The Elves of Mirkwood are a minor element in the novel, and Thranduil in particular has no quarrel with Thorin or his company of Dwarves, who are only imprisoned because they are trespassing on the Elvenking's territory and refuse to tell him why. The existing story narrative of Thranduil as an isolationist leader was identified by the writers, who worked with Pace to develop the character's backstory. In the film series, Thranduil rides a giant elk resembling a Megaloceros; the "elk" was a horse named Moose, made up to look like a deer. This version of the character is depicted as somewhat unhinged.

With those little clues, we kind of fleshed out the character, and I'm really excited with what we've come up with. He's complicated. Tolkien’s elves are such fascinating creatures; I've always thought they were less like humans than they are forces of nature, like a blizzard or a dangerous big cat in the jungle. — Lee Pace

Pace called Thranduil the "Elvenking" instead of his actual name during interviews, following Tolkien's usage in The Hobbit, which Pace read as a high school student. In an interview with The Georgia Straight, Pace explained that Thranduil, unlike other villainous characters he had played like Ronan the Accuser, is morally ambiguous, as he is only at odds with the Dwarves. Pace felt that it was important for him to find enjoyment in playing characters who are larger-than-life, and that it was on him to try to figure out who his character was with what little that he knew. Pace praised the rest of the cast and crew members of The Hobbit film project as inspirational, noting that they were collectively telling a big story which was intended to be fully fleshed out on the green screen and which they had no idea how it would ultimately turn out.

=== In other media ===
In the 1977 animated version of The Hobbit, Thranduil is voiced by Otto Preminger.

Thranduil is one of the playable heroes in The Lord of the Rings: The Battle for Middle-earth II (2006) real-time strategy game, joining Elrond, Arwen, Glorfindel, and the Dwarves in destroying Dol Guldur in the final battle of the good storyline, and falling to the Goblins mustered by the Mouth of Sauron in the alternate evil storyline.

In 2020, Weta Workshop released a limited edition of a statue featuring The Hobbit film series iteration of Thranduil, depicted seated on his throne with a guard standing in attention before him. The statue recreates Pace's likeness for the character and is designed at 1:6 scale, measuring 41.33 inches in width and 39.37 inches in height.

== Reception and analysis ==
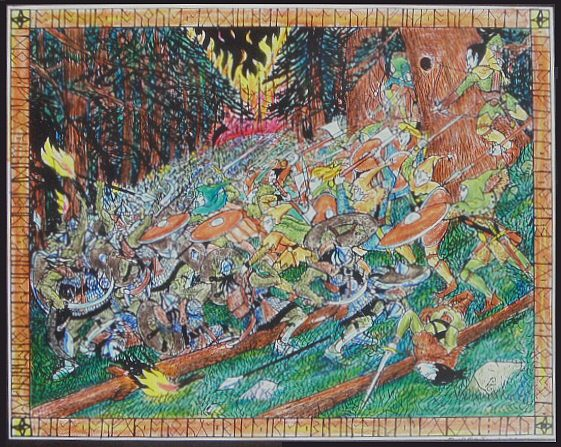
Battle Under the Trees: Tom Loback's depiction of Dol Guldur's attack on Thranduil's wood-elves in Mirkwood

=== Tolkien ===
In an article published by Tor.com as part of a bi-weekly series titled "Exploring the People of Middle-earth", Megan N. Fontenot found it surprising that in The Fellowship of the Ring, none of the attendees at the Council of Elrond pays much attention to Legolas' status as Thranduil's heir. Fontenot found the lore behind Thranduil to be underdeveloped, as his name appeared more often in the Appendices than in the main narrative.

Tom Loback, writing in Mythlore, attempts to evaluate the strength of the orc forces that attacked Thranduil in the battle under Mirkwood's dark trees (Dagor Dauroth). He estimated, on the basis of the standard words that Tolkien uses for military forces, and the need for the forces to be superior to Thranduil's, that the Witch-king used a "legion" of around 10,000 orcs for the initial reconnaissance, and an "army" of 2 or 3 legions of orcs, for the main attack.

=== The Hobbit film trilogy ===
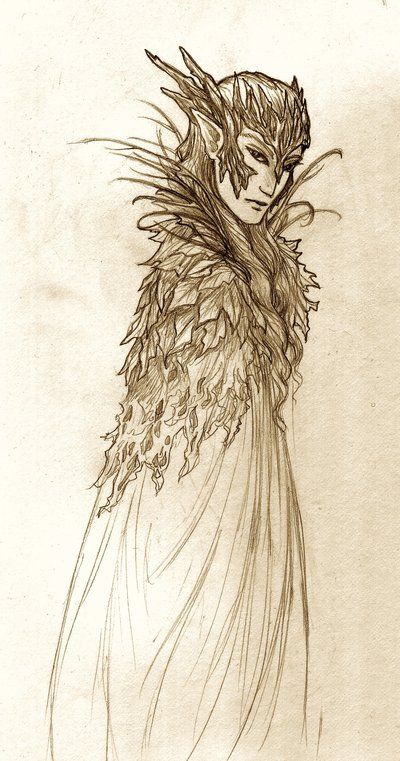
Fan art of Thranduil, the Elvenking

Lee Pace's portrayal of the Elvenking in Jackson's film trilogy was received warmly. Dennis Perkins from The A.V. Club found that Pace's "eerie intensity" made him a "fine elf king". Alisha Coelho from India Times described Pace's Thranduil as "a cold, calculative and condescending king" who is prettier than Galadriel but has less heart than Elrond. Business Review praised Pace's "aggressive" Thranduil as one of the better performances of The Battle of the Five Armies, and said that the movie gives audiences a better insight into the Elvenking's motivations as well as the reasons behind his isolationist outlook.

Nathan Caddell from The Georgia Straight observed that Pace "tried to stay as loyal as he could to the source material that he loved, using any small crumbs to try to gain more information about his role", and noted that while it is debatable as to whether Thranduil is an evil character, the "vindictive elf" is a departure from Pace's previous roles, which reflected his warm personality. In a review of the 4K Ultra HD Blu-Ray edition of The Desolation Of Smaug, M. Enois Duarte from High-Def Digest wrote that the confrontation between Thorin and Thranduil was one of the more interesting aspects of the expanded material introduced by Jackson's vision of Tolkien's original narrative for The Hobbit.

Conversely, Kirsten Acuna from Business Insider found the depiction of Thranduil's motivations in the film series contradictory; she observed that he repeatedly stresses the prioritization of his people's lives to justify his unwillingness to help other communities in The Desolation of Smaug, and yet in the sequel is willing to risk the same over a war for the White Gems. Nevertheless, she found Thranduil to be much more likeable by the end of The Battle of the Five Armies.

Tanja Välisalo, in an empirical study of the audience reception of The Hobbit films, found that Thranduil was mentioned by just under 5% of respondents, placing him 7th in the list of people's favourites among the films' cast of characters. They found the character sexually attractive, along with Thorin (played by the "handsome" Richard Armitage). In addition, the audience had an "allegiance" to the character; Välisalo cites as illustration comments like "Thranduil truly captured me" and "this character's make-up and character design ... were a perfect success."

== Sources ==
- Tolkien, J. R. R. (2002) [1937]. Douglas A. Anderson (ed.). The Annotated Hobbit. Boston: Houghton Mifflin. ISBN 978-0-618-13470-0.
- Tolkien, J. R. R. (1954a). The Fellowship of the Ring. The Lord of the Rings. Boston: Houghton Mifflin. Book 2, ch. 2 "The Council of Elrond". OCLC 9552942.
- Tolkien, J. R. R. (1954). The Two Towers. The Lord of the Rings. Boston: Houghton Mifflin. Book 1, ch. 8 "The Road to Isengard". OCLC 1042159111.
- Tolkien, J. R. R. (1955). The Return of the King. The Lord of the Rings. Boston: Houghton Mifflin. Appendix B, "The Tale of the Years". OCLC 519647821.
- Tolkien, J. R. R. (1980). Christopher Tolkien (ed.). Unfinished Tales. Boston: Houghton Mifflin. "The History of Galadriel and Celeborn," Appendix B: "The Sindarian Princes of the Silvan Elves". ISBN 978-0-395-29917-3.
- Tolkien, J. R. R. (1996). Christopher Tolkien (ed.). The Peoples of Middle-earth. Boston: Houghton Mifflin. "The Appendix on Languages", Languages at the end of the Third Age. ISBN 978-0-395-82760-4.
