= Isildur =

Character in Tolkien's Middle-earth

- Tolkien's legendarium character
- Harry Sinclair as Isildur holding the One Ring
- First appearance: "Annals of the Kings and Rulers"; The Fellowship of the Ring; 1955
- Last appearance: "The Disaster of the Gladden Fields"; Unfinished Tales; 1980
- Created by: J.R.R. Tolkien
- Portrayed by: Harry Sinclair (2000s films); Maxim Baldry (Rings of Power)

In-universe information
- Race: Men
- Title: High-King of the Númenorean Realms in Exile
- Family: House of Elendil
- Children: Elendur; Ciryon; Aratan; Valandil
- Book(s): The Lord of the Rings; The Silmarillion; Unfinished Tales

Isildur (Quenya: [iˈsildur]) is a fictional character in J. R. R. Tolkien's Middle-earth, the elder son of Elendil, descended from Elros, the founder of the island Kingdom of Númenor. He fled with his father when the island was drowned, becoming in his turn King of Arnor and Gondor. He cut the One Ring from Sauron's hand, but instead of destroying it, was influenced by its power and claimed it as his own. He was killed by orcs, and the Ring betrayed him by slipping off his finger just before his death. The Ring then became lost in the River Anduin. This set the stage for the Ring to pass to Gollum and then to Bilbo, as told in The Hobbit; that in turn provided the central theme, the quest to destroy the Ring, for The Lord of the Rings.

Tolkien began a time-travel story, The Lost Road, in which a father and a son were to reappear time and again in human families throughout history. One of the appearances was to be in Númenor just before its fall, with the father as Elendil and the son as Herendil, later called Isildur. The story was abandoned, but Tolkien reused the characters and events.

Isildur features briefly in voiced-over flashback sequences of Peter Jackson's The Lord of the Rings film trilogy. The video game Middle-earth: Shadow of War departs from Tolkien's narrative by having Sauron make Isildur into a Nazgûl or ringwraith. In the television series The Lord of the Rings: The Rings of Power, the young Isildur is played by the English actor Maxim Baldry.

== Fictional history ==
=== Númenor ===
The downfall of Númenor and the changing of the world: the island is drowned by Ilúvatar, and Elendil, Isildur and their people escape to Middle-earth.

In Tolkien's legendarium, the island of Númenor, in the great sea to the West of Middle-earth, was created at the start of the Second Age as a reward to the men who had fought against the fallen Vala Morgoth, the primary antagonist of the First Age. (Note: Tolkien (1977), "Akallabêth") Isildur's father was Elendil, descended from Elros, founder of the Kingdom of Númenor. Since Elros was half-elven, from the marriage of Beren to the elf Lúthien, and Tuor to Idril, he and his descendants enjoyed much longer life than other men. (Note: Tolkien (1977), ch. 19 "Of Beren and Lúthien")

In Isildur's youth, Ar-Pharazôn, King of Númenor, was corrupted by the fallen Maia Sauron, who urged that Nimloth the White Tree be cut down. Isildur went to the court of the king in disguise and stole a fruit of the tree. He was severely wounded during his escape, but his sacrifice was not in vain: Nimloth was cut down and burned shortly afterwards, but the line of the White Tree continued by way of the stolen fruit. When Númenor was destroyed by the creator, Ilúvatar, Elendil's family escaped in nine ships, three of which were manned by Isildur.

=== In Middle-earth ===
The refugees from Númenor fled east to the continent of Middle-earth. Isildur's father Elendil landed in the north and founded the realm of Arnor, while Isildur and his brother Anárion landed in the south, where they established the realm of Gondor and the cities of Osgiliath, Minas Ithil, and Minas Anor. Isildur lived in Minas Ithil on the east side of the River Anduin and Anárion in Minas Anor on the west side; they ruled Gondor jointly from Osgiliath. (Note: Tolkien (1977), "Of the Rings of Power and the Third Age")

The Dark Lord Sauron captured Minas Ithil and destroyed the White Tree Isildur had planted there. Isildur and his family escaped down the Anduin by boat, bearing with them a seedling of the tree. They sailed to Lindon, seeking the Elven King Gil-galad and Elendil in Arnor. Anárion bought time for Gondor by defending Osgiliath and driving Sauron back to the mountains, while Elendil and Gil-galad marshalled their forces.

Isildur returned with Elendil and Gil-galad in the Last Alliance of Elves and Men. After the Alliance defeated Sauron's host at the Battle of Dagorlad, they advanced into Mordor and laid siege to Barad-dûr. When Minas Ithil was recaptured, Isildur sent his younger sons Aratan and Ciryon to man that fortress, preventing Sauron and his forces from escaping that way. Isildur was accompanied throughout the war by his eldest son Elendur. The campaign in Mordor was long and bitter, and Anárion was killed by a stone from the Dark Tower. (Note: Tolkien 1955, Appendix B, "The Second Age")

Besieged in the Dark Tower for seven years, the enemy was all but defeated, and Sauron himself appeared to challenge the king. During the final battle on the slopes of Mount Doom, Elendil and Gil-galad were both killed in combat with the Dark Lord, but Sauron's mortal form was destroyed. (Note: Carpenter 2023, #131: Elendil and Gil-galad were "slain in the act of slaying Sauron.") The Second Age ended, and Isildur became High King of both Arnor and Gondor.

Isildur took up the hilt-shard of Narsil, Elendil's sword, and cut the One Ring from the hand of Sauron. Despite the urging of Elrond and Círdan, Gil-galad's lieutenants, Isildur did not throw the Ring into the fires of Mount Doom. He made a scroll with a description of the Ring and a copy of its fading inscription. This scroll was deposited in the archives of Minas Anor (which much later was renamed Minas Tirith), and the scroll was discovered by Gandalf nearly an Age later.

After the fall of Sauron, the greater part of the army of Arnor returned home while Isildur stayed in Gondor for a year, restoring order and defining its boundaries. He planted the seedling of the White Tree in Minas Anor in memory of Anárion. As his brother's helmet had been crushed during his death at Barad-dûr, Isildur left his own helmet as Gondor's crown. He installed Anárion's son Meneldil as King of Gondor, and returned north en route to Arnor with his three sons. He made first for Rivendell, where his wife and his fourth son, Valandil, had stayed throughout the War of the Last Alliance. (Note: Tolkien 1955, Appendix B, "The Third Age")

=== Death ===
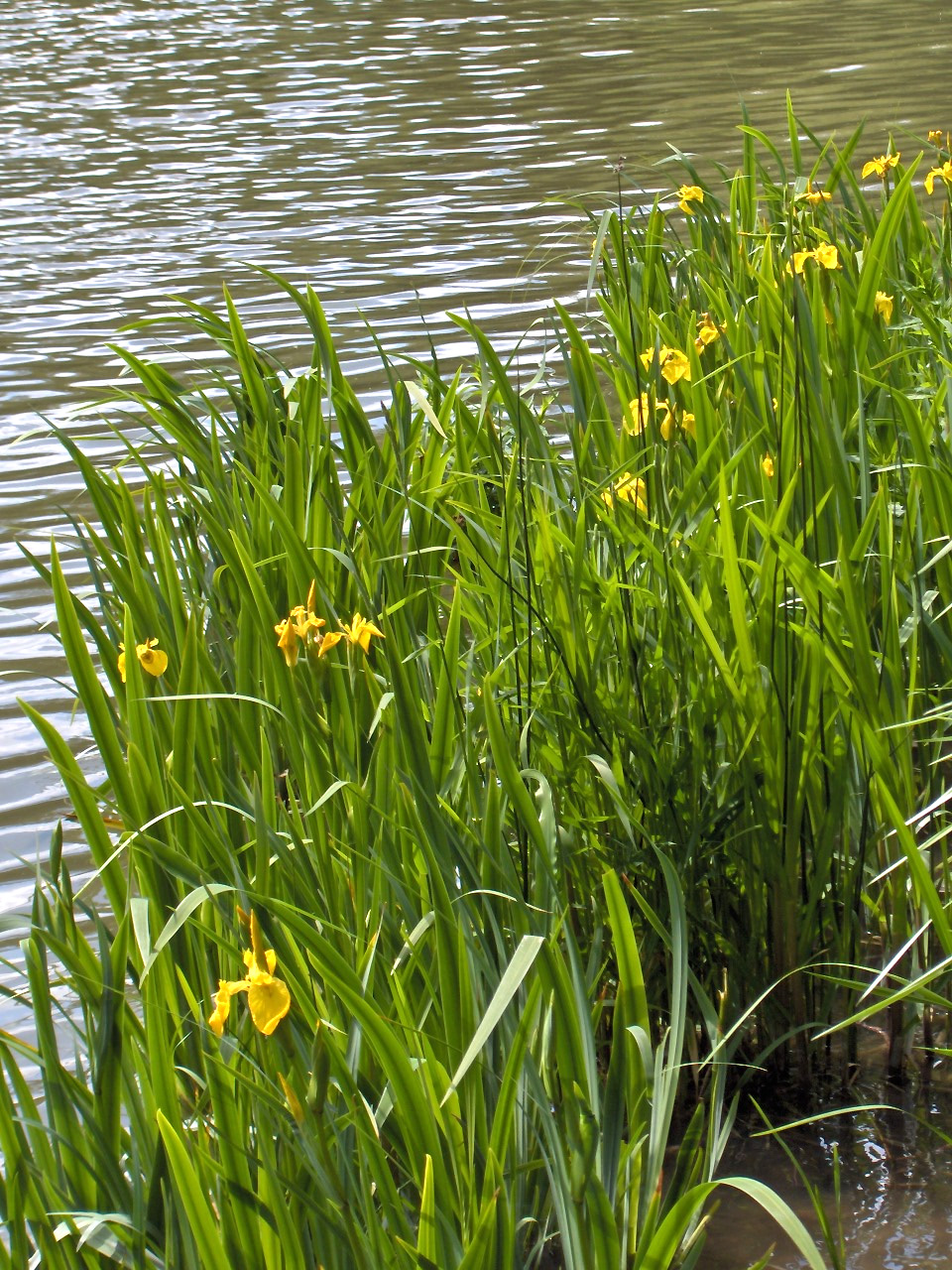
'Gladden' is an old name for the yellow iris which grows beside freshwater.

At the Gladden Fields in the middle course of the River Anduin Isildur's party was ambushed by roaming Orcs from the Misty Mountains. It was 5 October in the second year of Isildur's reign, and the second year of the Third Age. (Note: Tolkien (1980), part 3, ch. 1 "The Disaster of the Gladden Fields")

Tolkien wrote two differing accounts of the battle leading to Isildur's end.

"Of the Rings of Power and the Third Age", at the end of The Silmarillion, is told from the point of view of the Eldar. It states that Isildur had set no guard in his camp at night, deeming that all his foes had been overthrown, and orcs attacked him there.

In Unfinished Tales Tolkien gives a fuller account, writing that Isildur was ambushed on the march by orcs. Isildur had left Minas Anor with a party of some 200 soldiers. His men had to march, as their horses were mainly beasts of burden, not for riding. They had two dozen archers, but they were too few to be effective. Isildur chose the route along the Anduin rather than the safer but longer road North. Sauron, however, had deployed an army of orcs east of the Misty Mountains to attack stragglers of the Last Alliance. The orcs did not show themselves when the armies of the Elves and Men passed by, but they were more than a match for Isildur's small company. Isildur was assailed at sunset. Though the first orc sortie was beaten off, the orcs regrouped and surrounded Isildur's party to prevent his escape. When nightfall came the orcs assaulted him from all sides. (Note: Tolkien (1977), "Of the Rings of Power and the Third Age")

The Dúnedain were surrounded and outnumbered. Ciryon was killed and Aratan was mortally wounded in a failed attempt to rescue Elendur, who urged his father to flee. Isildur put on the Ring, hoping to escape under the cover of invisibility. Fleeing to the Anduin, he cast off his armour and tried to swim to the other side of the river, but the Ring betrayed him by slipping (of its own volition) from his finger. Isildur felt that the Ring was missing and was momentarily dismayed, but with the burden of the Ring removed he rallied and made for the opposite bank. Despite the darkness, the royal Elendilmir gem that he was wearing betrayed his position to orcs on the far bank, who were seeking survivors from the attack, and they killed him with their poisoned arrows. Isildur's squire, Ohtar, saved Elendil's sword from the enemy, fleeing into the valley before the orcs encircled Isildur's company. Estelmo, Elendur's squire, was found alive under his master's body, stunned by a club.

During the War of the Ring the Nazgûl searched the Gladden Fields, but failed to find any traces of Isildur's remains. Their efforts were hampered by Saruman, who had deceived the Nazgûl, and who had arrived there first. After the overthrow of Saruman and the opening of Orthanc (in The Two Towers) Gimli found a hidden closet containing the original Elendilmir, which was presumed lost when Isildur died.

== Development ==
In the short work The Fall of Númenor, written before 1937, Tolkien wrote of two brothers named Elendil and Valandil, who escaped the destruction of Númenor and founded two kingdoms in Middle-earth, Elendil in the north and Valandil in the south. Valandil was thus a precursor to the later Isildur, although in this work he was not Elendil's son but his brother. (Note: Tolkien 1987, 3. "The Lost Road")

Soon afterwards Tolkien started a time-travel story, The Lost Road, in which a father and a son were to reappear time and again in human families throughout history. Only two chapters were written, one set in or near the present day, with the father named Oswin and the son Alboin, and one set in Númenor just before its fall, with the father named Elendil and the son Herendil. Here Valandil is the name of Elendil's father. It seems that Herendil (later Isildur) and his father were going to escape the destruction of Númenor as in The Fall of Númenor, but the story did not progress that far before it was abandoned.

In one of the earliest manuscripts of The Lord of the Rings, written in 1938, in the chapter which became "The Shadow of the Past", Gandalf tells Frodo (then called Bingo) that his ring "fell from the hand of an elf as he swam across a river". (Note: Tolkien 1988, pp. 78, 85, 261) Although Isildur was not an elf, this was the earliest germ of the story of Isildur's death. In the next version of this part of the story Isildur himself appears, first named Ithildor, then changed to Isildor. He is described as a man who cut the One Ring from Sauron's finger after his father (here named Orendil) defeated Sauron in single combat, then lost it while swimming across a river to escape Orcs.

== House of Elendil ==
Half-elven family tree (Note: Tolkien 1977, "Of the Rings of Power and the Third Age": Family Trees I and II: "The house of Finwë and the Noldorin descent of Elrond and Elros", and "The descendants of Olwë and Elwë") (Note: Tolkien 1955, Appendix A: Annals of the Kings and Rulers, I The Númenórean Kings)

Melian the Maia	Thingol of the Teleri	House of Bëor	House of Haleth	House of Hador	Finwë of the Noldor	Indis of the Vanyar	Olwë of the Teleri
Barahir	Belegund	Hareth	Galdor	Fingolfin	Finarfin	Eärwen
Lúthien	Beren	Rían	Huor	Húrin	Turgon	Elenwë
Dior	Nimloth	Tuor	Idril
Eluréd	Elurín	Elwing	Eärendil	Celeborn	Galadriel
Elros	Elrond	Celebrían
22 Kings of Númenor and Lords of Andúnië
Elendil
Isildur	Anárion
22 Kings of Arnor and Arthedain	27 Kings of Gondor
Arvedui	Fíriel
15 Dúnedain; Chieftains
Aragorn	Arwen	Elladan	Elrohir
Eldarion	daughters

Colour key:
Colour	Description
	Elves
	Men
	Maiar
	Half-elven
	Half-elven who chose the fate of Elves
	Half-elven who chose the fate of mortal Men

== Analysis ==
Paul H. Kocher writes that whereas Isildur claimed the Ring as his own, Aragorn, on hearing Frodo's exclamation that since he is Isildur's direct descendant the Ring must be his, at once renounces all claim to it. Aragorn explains that he searched for it to help Gandalf as "it seemed fit that Isildur's heir should labour to repair Isildur's fault", an inherited wrong. Catholic scholars have noted that just as Jesus, in his role as king, is a descendant of King David, Aragorn is a descendant of Isildur. The Tolkien scholar Nicholas Birns notes Isildur's survival, along with his father Elendil, of Númenor's catastrophic fall, an event that recalls to him Plato's Atlantis, the Biblical fall of man, and Noah's flood; he notes that Tolkien called Elendil a "Noachian figure", (Note: Carpenter 2023, Letter #131 to Milton Waldman, late 1951) an echo of the biblical Noah.

Tom Shippey writes that Gandalf's account to the Council of Elrond of Isildur's description of the Ring combines hints of the ancient time in which Isildur lived, with old words like "glede" (a hot coal) and obsolete endings as in "fadeth", and "loseth". It also provides a sudden reminder of Gollum's name for the Ring, with "It is precious to me, though I buy it with great pain." His use of the "ominous word 'precious'" is, Shippey writes, quite enough for readers to guess that Isildur was already becoming addicted to the Ring.

== Adaptations ==
=== Film ===
Harry Sinclair plays Isildur in Peter Jackson's The Lord of the Rings film trilogy.

In Ralph Bakshi's animated 1978 film version of The Lord of the Rings, Isildur is called Prince Isildur of the mighty Kings from across the Sea and appears as the events of the Last Alliance are portrayed in silhouette. In Peter Jackson's The Lord of the Rings film trilogy, Isildur is played by Harry Sinclair.

Shippey writes that Jackson uses the voice-over to say of Isildur that he had "this one chance to destroy evil for ever", commenting that when Tolkien says "for ever", he at once indicates that that optimistic hope is wrong: Elrond says he recalls "when Thangorodrim was broken, and the Elves deemed that evil was ended for ever, and it was not so." Shippey writes that there is a glimpse here of a sharp difference between Jackson's and Tolkien's concept of evil, and their respective media: Tolkien believed that even the best of men were fallen, victory always temporary, and portrayed that in his writings, whereas a dramatic medium like film required good on one side and bad on the other.

=== Streaming ===
In the streaming series The Lord of the Rings: The Rings of Power, the young Isildur is played by the English actor Maxim Baldry. Although Isildur eventually fails to destroy the One Ring, the series' showrunner Patrick McKay stated that the intention was to present Isildur more favourably, as burdened by heavy responsibilities; McKay compared the character to the gangster Michael Corleone from The Godfather trilogy.

=== Video games ===
In the video game Middle-earth: Shadow of War, Isildur's fate differs from the book. After he was attacked by the orcs, they transported his lifeless body to Mordor at Sauron's behest. Sauron revived Isildur with one of the nine rings, and then tortured him until his spirit was broken and he became a Nazgûl. The specific power of his ring allowed him to raise the dead and have them fight by his side as mindless minions. Eventually, he was defeated by the game's protagonist, Talion, after multiple encounters. Instead of subduing him with his own ring of power, Talion chose to spare Isildur and release his spirit, allowing him to proceed into the afterlife after millennia of service to Sauron. Talion took Isildur's ring and eventually became a Nazgûl himself.

Royal titles
First Kingdom established	King of Gondor; SA 3320 – TA 2 with Elendil the Tall (SA 3320 – 3441); Anárion (SA 3320 – 3440); Meneldil (TA 2)	Succeeded by Meneldil
Preceded by Elendil the Tall	King of Arnor; SA 3441 – TA 2	Succeeded by Valandil
Preceded by Elendil the Tall	High-King of the Númenorean Realms in Exile; SA 3441 – TA 2	Dormant Title next held by Aragorn Elessar as King of the Reunited Kingdom
