= Elendil =

Fictional character in J. R. R. Tolkien's Middle-earth

- Tolkien's legendarium character

In-universe information
- Race: Men
- Title(s): Lord of Andúnië; High King of the Dúnedain; High King of Arnor and Gondor
- Affiliation: Lords of Andúnië; The Faithful; Last Alliance of Elves and Men
- Weapon: The sword Narsil
- Children: Isildur; Anárion
- Relatives: Amandil (father)
- Origin: Númenor
- Book(s): The Lord of the Rings (1954-1955); The Silmarillion (1977); Unfinished Tales (1980)

Elendil (Quenya: [ɛˈlendil]) is a fictional character in J. R. R. Tolkien's legendarium. He is mentioned in The Lord of the Rings, The Silmarillion and Unfinished Tales. He was the father of Isildur and Anárion, last Lord of Andúnië on the island of Númenor, and having escaped its downfall by sailing to Middle-earth, became the first High King of Arnor and Gondor. In the Last Alliance of Men and Elves, Elendil and Gil-galad laid siege to the Dark Lord Sauron's fortress of Barad-dûr, and fought him hand-to-hand for the One Ring. Both Elendil and Gil-galad were killed, and Elendil's son Isildur took the Ring for himself.

Tolkien called Elendil a "Noachian figure", an echo of the biblical Noah. Elendil escaped from the flood that drowned Númenor, itself an echo of the myth of Atlantis, founding new Númenórean kingdoms in Middle-earth.

== Fictional history ==
=== Biography ===
Elendil was born in Númenor, son of Amandil, Lord of Andúnië and leader of the "Faithful" (those who remained loyal to the Valar), who maintained a strong friendship with the Elves and preserved the old ways against the practices of King Ar-Pharazôn and Sauron. His father Amandil had been a great admiral of the Númenórean fleet and a close friend to Ar-Pharazôn in their youth, but as Sauron's influence grew, he resorted to doing what their ancestor Eärendil had done: sailing to Valinor and asking for the pardon of the Valar. Amandil was never heard of again, but on his urging, Elendil, his sons Isildur and Anárion, and their supporters fled the downfall of Númenor at the end of the Second Age, escaping to Middle-earth in nine ships. Elendil landed in Lindon, where he was befriended by Gil-galad, the Elven King. The waves carried Isildur and Anárion south to the Bay of Belfalas and the mouth of the River Anduin. (Note: Tolkien 1977, "Of the Rings of Power and the Third Age") With them the leaders took the palantíri, the "Seeing Stones" that were given to the Lords of Andúnië by the Elves of Tol Eressëa, and a seedling of Nimloth, the White Tree of Númenor. (Note: Tolkien 1977, "Akallabêth")

Unfinished Tales states that, upon landing in Middle-earth, Elendil proclaimed in Quenya: Et Eärello Endorenna utúlien. Sinome maruvan ar Hildinyar tenn' Ambar-metta! "Out of the Great Sea to Middle-earth I am come. In this place will I abide, and my heirs, unto the ending of the world." (Note: Tolkien 1980, Part III, ch. 1 "The Disaster of the Gladden Fields") His heir and 40th generation descendant in father-to-son line Aragorn spoke these traditional words again when he took up the crown of Gondor in The Return of the King. (Note: Tolkien 1955, Book VI, ch. 5 "The Steward and the King")

Elendil founded the northern realm of Arnor and its capital city of Annúminas. His sons founded the southern realm of Gondor; Anárion founded the city of Minas Anor (later Minas Tirith) in Anórien, and Isildur founded Minas Ithil (later Minas Morgul) in Ithilien. Elendil was the High King, ruling directly over Arnor and indirectly over Gondor, via its King.

As explained in The Fellowship of the Ring, Sauron eventually returned to Middle-earth, establishing a stronghold in Mordor, which was next to Gondor. He attacked, seizing Minas Ithil. Isildur fled north to his father, leaving Anárion in charge of Gondor. Elendil and Isildur returned south, together with Gil-galad and their combined armies, in the Last Alliance of Elves and Men. They defeated Sauron in the Battle of Dagorlad, and laid siege to his stronghold of Barad-dûr. During this long siege Anárion was killed. Finally, Sauron came out in person to do battle. Gil-galad and Elendil fought him, but both were killed, and Elendil's sword was broken beneath him. Isildur used his father's broken sword to cut the One Ring from Sauron's hand. (Note: Tolkien 1954a, Book II, ch. 2 "The Council of Elrond")

=== Line of the Half-elven ===
Half-elven family tree (Note: Tolkien 1977, "Of the Rings of Power and the Third Age": Family Trees I and II: "The house of Finwë and the Noldorin descent of Elrond and Elros", and "The descendants of Olwë and Elwë") (Note: Tolkien 1955, Appendix A: Annals of the Kings and Rulers, I The Númenórean Kings)

Melian the Maia	Thingol of the Teleri	House of Bëor	House of Haleth	House of Hador	Finwë of the Noldor	Indis of the Vanyar	Olwë of the Teleri
Barahir	Belegund	Hareth	Galdor	Fingolfin	Finarfin	Eärwen
Lúthien	Beren	Rían	Huor	Húrin	Turgon	Elenwë
Dior	Nimloth	Tuor	Idril
Eluréd	Elurín	Elwing	Eärendil	Celeborn	Galadriel
Elros	Elrond	Celebrían
22 Kings of Númenor and Lords of Andúnië
Elendil
Isildur	Anárion
22 Kings of Arnor and Arthedain	27 Kings of Gondor
Arvedui	Fíriel
15 Dúnedain; Chieftains
Aragorn	Arwen	Elladan	Elrohir
Eldarion	daughters

Colour key:
Colour	Description
	Elves
	Men
	Maiar
	Half-elven
	Half-elven who chose the fate of Elves
	Half-elven who chose the fate of mortal Men

== Analysis ==
=== Biblical echoes ===
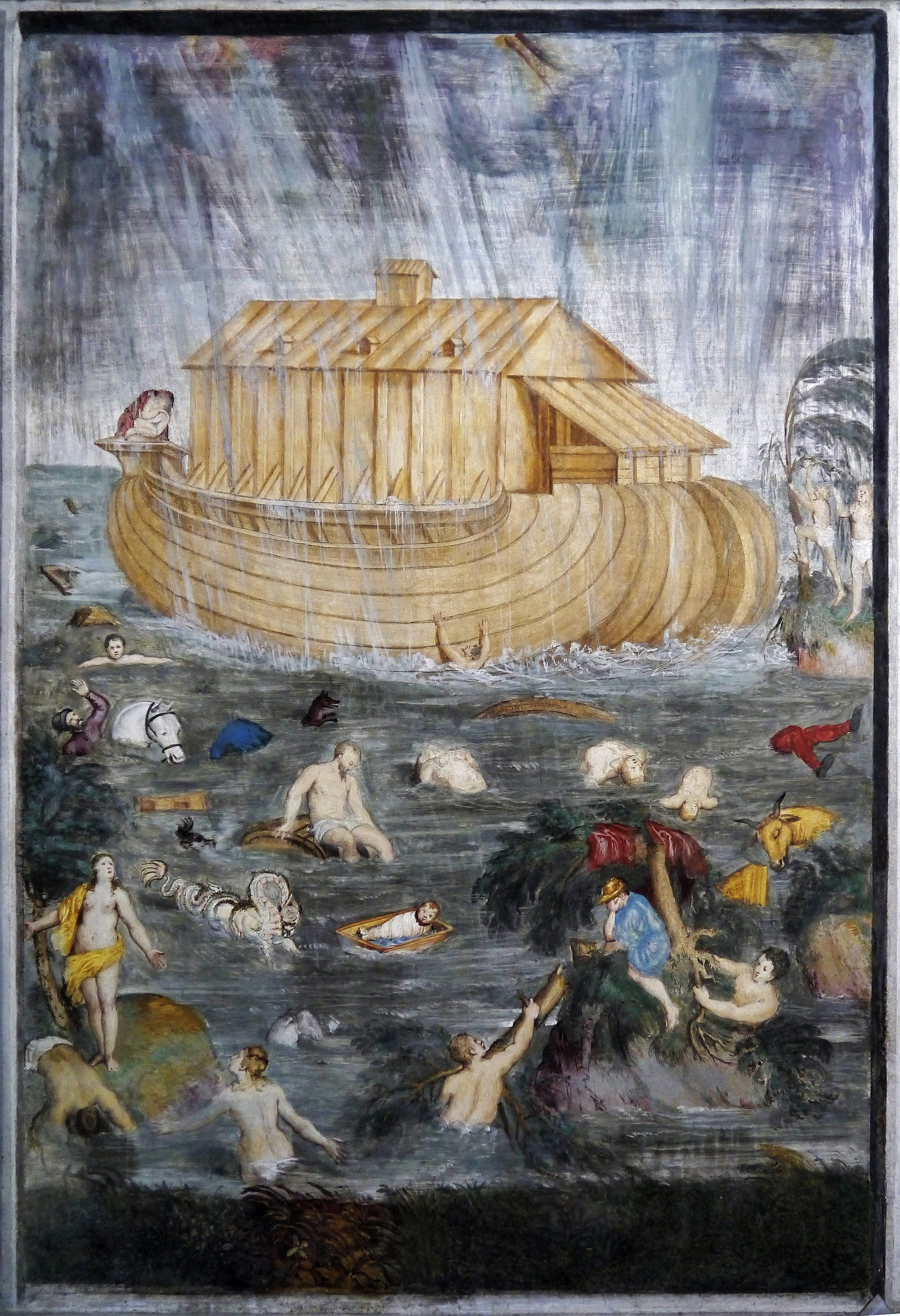
Tolkien compared Elendil to the Biblical Noah, who similarly escaped from the wreck of a civilisation by ship. (Note: Carpenter 2023, Letter #131 to Milton Waldman, late 1951) Fresco in San Maurizio al Monastero Maggiore, Milan

Nicholas Birns, a scholar of literature, notes Elendil's survival of Númenor's fall, an event that recalls to him both Plato's Atlantis and the Biblical fall of man; he notes that Tolkien called Elendil a "Noachian figure", an echo of the biblical Noah. Tolkien explains that Elendil "held off" from the Númenórean rebellion, and had kept ships ready; he "flees before the overwhelming storm of the wrath of the West [from Valinor], and is borne high upon the towering waves that bring ruin to the west of the Middle-earth." Birns notes that Elendil, who he calls a hugely important figure in Middle-earth, must be later "in comparative time" than Noah; where Noah was a refugee, Elendil was "an imperialist, a founder of realms". However, he grants that "Noachian" implies a class of people like Noah, and the possibility of different kinds of flood. Birns comments that Middle-earth has its Creation and Flood myths, but not exactly a fall of man. He suggests that Tolkien, as a Catholic, may have been more comfortable working with the forces of nature seen in Creation and Flood, but preferred to leave the fall alone; he notes that both Creation and Flood are found in non-Christian tales from the Middle East, citing the Epic of Gilgamesh for the Flood and the Enuma Elish for Creation.

The priest and Tolkien scholar Fleming Rutledge writes that Aragorn, narrating the Lay of Beren and Lúthien to the hobbits, tells them that Lúthien's line "shall never fail". Rutledge talks of the "kings of Númenor, that is Westernesse", and as they gaze at him, they see that the moon "climbs behind him as if to crown him", which Rutledge calls an echo of the Transfiguration. Rutledge explains that Aragorn is of the line of Elendil and knows he will inherit "the crown of Elendil and the other Kings of vanished Númenor", just as Jesus is of the line of King David, fulfilling the prophecy that the line of Kings would not fail.

Zak Cramer notes in Mallorn that Tolkien's middle name, Reuel, means "God's friend", and could be written "El's friend" with reference to the Hebrew word for "God". He speculates that Elendil, "Elf-friend", may have been a wordplay on this name.

=== Classical echoes ===
The classical scholar J. K. Newman compares the myth of Elendil and the defeat of Sauron with Jason's taking of the Golden Fleece. In both, a golden prize is taken; in both, there are evil consequences – Elendil's son Isildur is betrayed and the Ring is lost, leading to the War of the Ring and Frodo's quest; Medea murders Jason's children.

=== Germanic echoes ===
Tolkien wrote in a 1964 letter that the story of Elendil began when C. S. Lewis and he agreed to write a space travel and a time travel story, respectively. Tolkien's tale was to be called Númenor, the Land in the West, with repeated father–son pairs whose names meant "Bliss-friend" and "Elf-friend" each time. It was not completed, but survives as two unfinished time-travel novels, The Lost Road and The Notion Club Papers. The Elf-friends were to be Elwin in present time; Ælfwine (Old English) around 918 AD; Alboin from "Lombardic legend"; and eventually Elendil of Númenor. Tolkien states that he lost interest in the others, and focussed on Elendil, whose story he incorporated into his "main mythology". (Note: Carpenter 2023, Letter #257 to Christopher Bretherton, 16 July 1964) One of Tolkien's correspondents, the scholar of English, Rhona Beare, writes in Mythlore that Elendil is a "remote ancestor" of Alboin; when Alboin travels back in time he finds Númenor simultaneously familiar and strange, because he can see it both with Elendil's eyes and with his own.

Names of the frame story characters
Germanic	Old English	Meaning	Modern name	Quenya (in Númenor)
Alboin	Ælfwine	Elf-friend	Alwin, Elwin, Aldwin	Elendil
Audoin	Eadwine	Bliss-friend	Edwin	Herendil
—	Oswine	God-friend	Oswin, cf. Oswald	Valandil ("Valar-friend")

== Adaptations ==
Elendil was played by Peter McKenzie in Peter Jackson's 2001 film The Fellowship of the Ring, fighting a gigantic Sauron to the death.

In Peter Jackson's The Lord of the Rings: The Fellowship of the Ring, Elendil is portrayed by Peter McKenzie. He appears briefly in the prologue, where he is killed by Sauron. The action differs from the book, where Gil-galad and Elendil heroically defeated Sauron, at the cost of their own lives, allowing Isildur to take the Ring without difficulty. In the film, Sauron defeats Elendil, and Isildur fights Sauron, the action of cutting off his finger and the Ring serving to vanquish Sauron. Tolkien instructed that "Sauron should not be thought of as very terrible. The form that he took was that of a more than human stature, but not gigantic", though he "could appear as a commanding figure of great strength of body and supremely royal demeanor and countenance." (Note: Carpenter 2023, Letter #246 to Mrs Eileen Elgar, September 1963) Jackson chooses to make Sauron much larger than Elendil for his final battle. The scholar of English literature Robert Tally comments that it is ironic that Jackson may have come closest to Tolkien's intentions in the prologue by representing Sauron in humanoid form, while he is a disembodied eye everywhere else in the film series.

In the 2022 television series, The Lord of the Rings: The Rings of Power, Elendil is played by Lloyd Owen. The show introduces Elendil as a Númenórean nobleman, who serves as a sea captain. He is a widower with three adult children: sons Isildur and Anárion, and a daughter Eärien.

Royal titles
Preceded by Ar-Pharazôn the Golden as King of Númenor	High-King of the Númenorean Realms in Exile; SA 3320 - 3441	Succeeded by Isildur
First Kingdom established	King of Arnor; SA 3320 – 3441	Succeeded by Isildur
First Kingdom established	King of Gondor; SA 3320 – 3441 with Isildur and Anárion	Succeeded by Isildur
Titles of nobility
Preceded by Amandil	Lord of Andúnië; SA 3310 - 3319	Extinct Akallabêth the downfall of Númenor

== See also ==
- Dúnedain
