= Elrond =

Fictional elf from Tolkien's legendarium

- Middle-earth character

In-universe information
- Race: Half-elven, choosing the fate of Elves
- Children: Elladan; Elrohir; Arwen Evenstar
- Book(s): The Hobbit (1937); The Fellowship of the Ring (1954); The Return of the King (1955); The Silmarillion (1977); Unfinished Tales (1980)

Elrond Half-elven is a fictional character in J. R. R. Tolkien's Middle-earth legendarium. Both of his parents, Eärendil and Elwing, were half-elven, having both Men and Elves as ancestors. He is the bearer of the elven-ring Vilya, the Ring of Air, and master of Rivendell, where he has lived for thousands of years through the Second and Third Ages of Middle-earth. He was the Elf-king Gil-galad's herald at the end of the Second Age, saw Gil-galad and king Elendil fight the Dark Lord Sauron for the One Ring, and saw Elendil's son Isildur take it rather than destroy it.

He is introduced in The Hobbit, where he plays a supporting role, as he does in The Lord of the Rings and The Silmarillion. Scholars have commented on Elrond's archaic style of speech, noting that this uses genuinely archaic grammar, not just a sprinkling of old words. The effect is to make his speech distinctive, befitting his age and status, while remaining clear, and avoiding quaintness. He has been called a guide or wisdom figure, a wise person able to provide useful counsel to the protagonists. Just as Elrond prevented his daughter Arwen from marrying until conditions were met, so Tolkien's guardian, Father Francis Xavier Morgan, prevented Tolkien from becoming engaged or marrying until he came of age.

== Fictional biography ==
=== First Age ===
Elrond was born in the First Age at the refuge of the Mouths of Sirion in Beleriand, the son of the half-elven mariner Eärendil and Elwing his wife, and a great-grandson of Beren and Lúthien. Not long afterwards, the havens were destroyed by the sons of Fëanor, who captured Elrond and his brother Elros. Their parents feared that they would be killed; instead, they were befriended by Fëanor's sons Maedhros and Maglor. (Note: Tolkien 1977, ch. 24 "Of the Voyage of Eärendil and the War of Wrath") Like his parents but unlike his brother, Elrond chose to be counted among the Elves when the choice of kindreds was given to him. When Beleriand was destroyed at the end of the First Age, Elrond went to Lindon with the household of Gil-galad, the last High King of the Noldor.

=== Second Age ===
During the War of the Elves and the Dark Lord Sauron in the Second Age, the king Gil-galad sent Elrond to the defence of Eregion against the Dark Lord. Sauron destroyed Eregion and surrounded Elrond's army, but the dwarf-king Durin and the elf-king of Lórien, Amroth, attacked Sauron's rearguard. Sauron turned to fight them, and drove them back to Moria. Elrond was able to retreat north to a secluded valley, where he established the refuge of Imladris, later called Rivendell; he lived there through the Second and Third Ages. (Note: Tolkien 1955, Appendix B, "The Tale of Years", "The Second Age") (Note: Tolkien 1977, "Of the Rings of Power and the Third Age")

Near the end of the Second Age, the Last Alliance of Elves and Men was formed, and the army departed from Imladris to Mordor, led by Elendil and Gil-galad. Sauron killed both of them at the end of the siege of Barad-dûr. Elrond saw Elendil's son Isildur destroy Sauron's physical body and take the One Ring for himself; Elrond and Círdan urged Isildur to destroy it, but he refused. Elrond served as Gil-galad's herald, and he and Círdan were entrusted with the two Elven Rings that Gil-galad held. Elrond and Círdan were the only ones to stand with Gil-galad when he fell.

=== Third Age ===
Elrond married Celebrían, daughter of Celeborn and Galadriel, early in the Third Age. (Note: Tolkien 1955, Appendix B "The Tale of Years", "The Third Age") The place and date of Celebrían's birth are not specified. (Note: Tolkien 1980, p. 234) In the version of their history that describes Galadriel and Celeborn as rulers of Eregion in the Second Age, Galadriel and Celebrían left Eregion for Lórinand as Sauron's influence over Eregion grew. (Note: Tolkien 1980, p. 237.) According to one account, Celebrían and her parents later lived for many years in Rivendell (Imladris). (Note: Tolkien 1980, p. 240.) Celebrían and Elrond had three children: the twins Elladan and Elrohir, and Arwen Undómiel (Evenstar).

On a trip from Rivendell to Lórien, Celebrían was waylaid by Orcs in the Redhorn Pass on Caradhras in the Misty Mountains. She was captured and tormented and received a poisoned wound. She was rescued by her sons and healed by Elrond, but "after fear and torment" (Note: Tolkien 1996, pp. 235–236) she could no longer find joy in Middle-earth, so she passed to the Grey Havens and over the Sea to Valinor in the following year.

Elrond was an ally of the North-Kingdom of Arnor. Following its fall, Elrond harboured the Chieftains of the Dúnedain (the descendants of the Kings of Arnor) and the Sceptre of Annúminas, Arnor's symbol of royal authority. When Aragorn's father Arathorn was killed a few years after Aragorn's birth, Elrond raised Aragorn in his own household and became a surrogate father to him. Aware of his daughter Arwen's feelings for Aragorn, Elrond would permit their marriage only if Aragorn could unite Arnor and Gondor as High King. (Note: Tolkien 1955, Appendix A, 1, v, The Tale of Aragorn and Arwen)

In The Hobbit, Elrond gave shelter to Thorin Oakenshield and his company during their quest to retake Erebor from the Dragon Smaug. Elrond befriended the Hobbit Bilbo Baggins, the company's "burglar", and received him as a permanent guest some 60 years later. (Note: Tolkien 1937, ch. 3 "A Short Rest")

Now at this last we must take a hard road, a road unforeseen. There lies our hope, if hope it be. To walk into peril--to Mordor. We must send the Ring to the Fire. – Elrond

— J. R. R. Tolkien, The Fellowship of the Ring

Elrond headed the Council of Elrond, at which it was decided that the One Ring should be destroyed where it was forged, in Mount Doom in Mordor. He agreed that Frodo Baggins, Bilbo's nephew and heir, should bear the Ring during the journey, aided by eight others, reasoning that a company of nine in the service of Middle-earth would counteract the nine Nazgûl, Sauron's most fearsome servants, who sought to help their master conquer it. (Note: Tolkien 1954a, book 2, ch. 2 "The Council of Elrond")

When Arwen chose mortality in order to be with Aragorn, Elrond reluctantly accepted her decision as the greater good, as she would help to renew the declining lineage of the Dúnedain. When the Grey Company found Aragorn and the Rohirrim during their journey to Gondor, Elrond's son Elrohir told Aragorn, "I bring word to you from my father: The days are short. If thou art in haste, remember the Paths of the Dead." Aragorn took Elrond's advice, using the Paths of the Dead to reach Gondor in time to come to its aid. (Note: Tolkien 1955, book 5, ch. 2 The Passing of the Grey Company)

Elrond remained in Rivendell until the destruction of both the Ring and Sauron in the War of the Ring. He then travelled to Minas Tirith for the marriage of Arwen and Aragorn, now King of the Reunited Kingdom of Arnor and Gondor. Three years later, at the approximate age of 6,520, Elrond left Middle-earth to go over the Sea with Gandalf, Galadriel, Frodo, and Bilbo, never to return. Tolkien said that "after the destruction of the Ruling Ring the Three Rings of the Eldar lost their virtue. Then Elrond prepared at last to depart from Middle-earth and follow Celebrían." (Note: Tolkien 1996, p. 243.) Elrond and Celebrían were thus finally reunited, but separated forever from their daughter Arwen.

== Analysis ==
=== Role and responsibility ===
The Tolkien scholar Richard C. West writes that there is a familiar trope in stories for a harsh, disapproving father to set difficult and possibly fatal obstacles in the path of his daughter's unwelcome suitors. He gives as example King Thingol's demand that the hero Beren must bring a Silmaril from the iron crown of the Dark Lord Morgoth. But, he writes, Elrond is a caring father with no trace of cruelty. The demand that Arwen "shall not be the bride of any Man less than the King of both Gondor and Arnor" is in his view just "giving his foster son incentive to achieve what it is his hereditary duty to attempt anyway", as well as doing the best for his daughter: "Elrond loves them both".

The humanities scholar Brian Rosebury writes that Tolkien contrasts Elrond's paternal love for Arwen with the distant, painful relationship of Denethor, the despairing and ultimately suicidal Steward of Gondor, and his son Faramir. He notes that this was a major theme in Tolkien's legendarium, with father-son pairs like Húrin and Túrin, or the Dark Elf Eöl betrayed by his power-hungry son, Maeglin. Rosebury comments that Elrond's forbidding Arwen to marry has an analogue with Tolkien's own youth, when his guardian Father Francis Morgan took responsibility for Tolkien's moral wellbeing after his mother Mabel's death, blocking his relationship with Edith Bratt, whom he eventually married. (Note: Tolkien's engagement to Edith was delayed four years until he was 21.)

Charles W. Nelson, writing in Journal of the Fantastic in the Arts, describes Elrond as a guide or wisdom figure, a wise person able to provide useful counsel to the protagonists. He is seen in The Hobbit as one with knowledge of the ancient runes and the ability to read moon letters, as well as giving advice on the best route. In The Lord of the Rings, he is seen to have extensive knowledge of the history of Middle-earth, including of the One Ring, and provides wise assistance on planning the necessary action to destroy the Ring. That said, he also shows that he knows the limits of his knowledge, as the capabilities of Hobbits, in his words "the Shire-folk", are outside his experience. Such, Nelson concludes, is the function of a guide, and Elrond fulfils it "admirably" and to the best of his ability, just as in their different ways do Aragorn, Galadriel, Faramir, and Tom Bombadil.

Christine Larsen, in the Journal of Tolkien Research, analysed why Tolkien wrote "Master" Elrond, only once calling him "Lord of Rivendell" and never writing "Lord Elrond", in contrast for instance to "Lady Galadriel", "Lord Celeborn", and "the Elven-king Gil-galad". She notes that Elrond is certainly important, being "the thread that ties together all three of the great tales of the legendarium: Beren and Lúthien, The Fall of Gondolin, and The Children of Húrin." She notes too that the usage was clearly intentional, and that Tolkien was "excruciating[ly]" careful on such matters. She notes that he called Tom Bombadil "Master of wood, water, and hill", but denied that the term implied ownership. Further, "master" is used as a term of respect, as by Barliman Butterbur to the hobbits in Bree. Finally, she writes, mastery implies the skill of an authority or revered artist: the Dwarves are described as "masters of stone", as the Rohirrim are "masters of horses" and the Wizard Radagast is a "master of shapes and changes of hue". Applied to Elrond, he is a "master of healing", but more centrally he is the "greatest of lore-masters", a master of ancient wisdom and knowledge. She notes that among the Elves, the lore-masters were the Noldor: indeed that was the meaning of their name.

=== Style of speech ===
'Alas, no', said Elrond. 'We cannot use the Ruling Ring. That we now know too well. It belongs to Sauron and was made by him alone, and is altogether evil. Its strength, Boromir, is too great for anyone to wield at will, save only those who have already a great power of their own. But for them it holds an even deadlier peril. The very desire of it corrupts the heart. Consider Saruman. If any of the Wise should wield this Ring to overthrow the Lord of Mordor, using his own arts, he would set himself on Sauron's throne, and yet another Dark Lord would appear. And that is another reason why the Ring should be destroyed: as long as it is in the world it will be a danger even to the Wise. For nothing is evil in the beginning. Even Sauron was not so. I fear to take the Ring to hide it. I will not take the Ring to wield it.' – Elrond

— J. R. R. Tolkien, The Fellowship of the Ring

Thomas Kullmann, in the Nordic Journal of English Studies, describes Elrond's language as "archaic and stilted", marked out by formal speeches with the tripartite structure of rhetoric: "proposition, argumentation, and conclusion". Elrond, he writes, uses archaic conjunctions like "save" (meaning "except"), and literary phrases like "to wield at will", along with old-fashioned inversions of word order, like "That we now know too well". He notes however that Elrond uses simple short sentences, like "We cannot use the Ruling Ring."

The Tolkien scholar Tom Shippey writes that Tolkien, professionally interested in words and language, reveals character through styles of speech. Elrond is seen to use an archaic but clear style in the Council of Elrond. Shippey states that his use of grammatical inversions is now rare, but still colloquial, as in common phrases like "Down came the rain. Up went the umbrellas." He writes that the old rule was that the verb had to come second in the sentence, so if something other than a noun phrase began a sentence, then the noun had to go after the verb. In this way, Shippey writes, Tolkien gives Elrond a consistently archaic style, using not just old words "(the first resort of the amateur medievalist)" but more importantly through grammar. The effect is to make his speech distinctive, suiting his immense age, while remaining clear, and never merely quaint. Importantly, his way of speaking links him with Isildur, who becomes a key figure later in the chapter.

== Adaptations ==
Elrond in Ralph Bakshi's animated version of The Lord of the Rings

Cyril Ritchard voiced Elrond in the 1977 Rankin/Bass animated film adaptation of The Hobbit. In Ralph Bakshi's 1978 animated adaptation of The Lord of the Rings, Elrond was voiced by André Morell. In Rankin/Bass's 1980 sequel to The Hobbit, The Return of the King, actor Paul Frees voiced Elrond, Ritchard having died shortly after voicing the character in the previous film.

Carl Hague portrayed Elrond in National Public Radio's 1979 radio production of The Lord of the Rings. Hugh Dickson portrayed Elrond in BBC Radio's 1981 serialisation of The Lord of the Rings. In the 1993 Finnish television miniseries Hobitit, Elrond is played by Leif Wager. In the 2006 Toronto musical adaptation of The Lord of the Rings, Elrond was portrayed by Victor A. Young.

Hugo Weaving as Elrond in Peter Jackson's The Lord of the Rings: The Fellowship of the Ring

In The Lord of the Rings film trilogy and The Hobbit trilogy directed by Peter Jackson, Elrond is portrayed by Hugo Weaving. In The Lord of the Rings: The Fellowship of the Ring Elrond holds Men in lesser regard after witnessing Isildur's failure to destroy the One Ring. Unlike in the book, he is skeptical of Aragorn both in terms of his ability to lead the Men of the West and the courtship of his daughter. As shown in the flashback scene in The Lord of the Rings: The Two Towers, he forces Aragorn to end his engagement to Arwen so that she can leave to the Undying Lands, although she eventually makes the decision to stay with Aragorn in Middle-Earth. Later, he sends a "surprisingly well-drilled army" to the Battle of Helm's Deep, an act the Tolkien scholar Tom Shippey writes was made to fit a 21st century view of political and military expectations.

In the 2022 television series The Lord of the Rings: The Rings of Power, a younger Elrond is played by Robert Aramayo.

Weaving reprised his role as both Elrond and the narrator in video games The Lord of the Rings: The Battle for Middle-earth II (2006) and The Lord of the Rings: Conquest (2009).

In the 2002 video game adaptation of The Fellowship of the Ring, Elrond is voiced by Jim Piddock, who later reprised the role for The Lord of the Rings: Aragorn's Quest (2010) and The Lord of the Rings: War in the North (2011). Elrond is one of the major characters in The Lord of the Rings Online (2007).

== Genealogy ==
Half-elven family tree (Note: Tolkien 1977, "Of the Rings of Power and the Third Age": Family Trees I and II: "The house of Finwë and the Noldorin descent of Elrond and Elros", and "The descendants of Olwë and Elwë") (Note: Tolkien 1955, Appendix A: Annals of the Kings and Rulers, I The Númenórean Kings)

Melian the Maia	Thingol of the Teleri	House of Bëor	House of Haleth	House of Hador	Finwë of the Noldor	Indis of the Vanyar	Olwë of the Teleri
Barahir	Belegund	Hareth	Galdor	Fingolfin	Finarfin	Eärwen
Lúthien	Beren	Rían	Huor	Húrin	Turgon	Elenwë
Dior	Nimloth	Tuor	Idril
Eluréd	Elurín	Elwing	Eärendil	Celeborn	Galadriel
Elros	Elrond	Celebrían
22 Kings of Númenor and Lords of Andúnië
Elendil
Isildur	Anárion
22 Kings of Arnor and Arthedain	27 Kings of Gondor
Arvedui	Fíriel
15 Dúnedain; Chieftains
Aragorn	Arwen	Elladan	Elrohir
Eldarion	daughters

Colour key:
Colour	Description
	Elves
	Men
	Maiar
	Half-elven
	Half-elven who chose the fate of Elves
	Half-elven who chose the fate of mortal Men
