= Arwen =

Fictional half-elf in Tolkien's Middle-Earth

- Middle-earth character
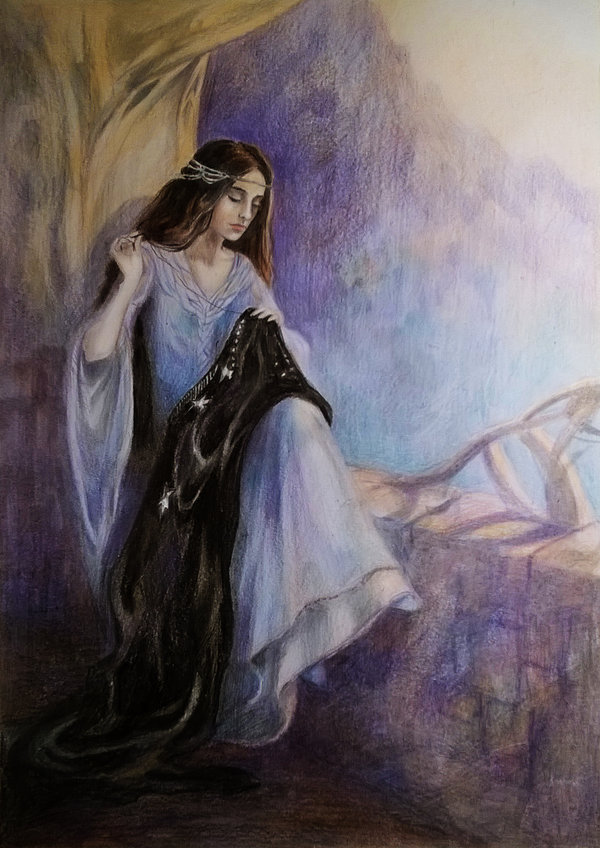
- Arwen sewing Aragorn's banner of the White Tree of Gondor by Anna Kulisz, inspired by Edmund Leighton's 1911 Stitching the Standard

In-universe information
- Race: Half-elven (chosen mortality)
- Spouse: Aragorn
- Children: Eldarion, daughters
- Book(s): The Fellowship of the Ring (1954); The Return of the King (1955); Unfinished Tales (1980)

Arwen Undómiel is a fictional character in J. R. R. Tolkien's Middle-earth legendarium. She appears in the novel The Lord of the Rings. Arwen is one of the half-elven who lived during the Third Age; her father was Elrond half-elven, lord of the Elvish sanctuary of Rivendell, while her mother was the Elf Celebrían, daughter of the Elf-queen Galadriel, ruler of Lothlórien. She marries the Man Aragorn, who becomes King of Arnor and Gondor.

In Peter Jackson's film adaptation of The Lord of the Rings, Arwen is played by Liv Tyler. She plays a more active role in the film than in the book, personally rescuing the Hobbit Frodo from the Black Riders at the Fords of Bruinen (a role played by Glorfindel in the book).

== Fictional biography ==
=== Narrative ===
Arwen was the youngest child of Elrond, lord of the Elvish sanctuary of Rivendell and leader of the High Elves remaining in Middle-earth at the end of the Third Age, and Celebrían, daughter of Galadriel, ruler of the Elvish forest realm of Lothlórien. Her elder brothers were the twins Elladan and Elrohir. (Note: Tolkien 1955 Appendix A: Annals of the Kings and Rulers) Her name "Ar-wen" means 'noble maiden' in Sindarin. She was given the name "Evenstar" as the most beautiful of the last generation of High Elves in Middle-earth. (Note: Tolkien 1954a book 2, ch. 1 "Many Meetings")

Arwen said: "Dark is the Shadow, and yet my heart rejoices; for you, Estel, shall be among the great whose valour will destroy it."
But Aragorn answered: "Alas! I cannot foresee it, and how it may come to pass is hidden from me. Yet with your hope I will hope. And the Shadow I utterly reject. But neither, lady, is the Twilight for me; for I am mortal, and if you will cleave to me, Evenstar, then the Twilight you must also renounce."
And she stood then as still as a white tree, looking into the West, and at last she said: "I will cleave to you, Dúnadan, and turn from the Twilight. Yet there lies the land of my people and the long home of all my kin." She loved her father dearly.

— J.R.R. Tolkien, The Lord of the Rings, Appendix A, part I (v) "The Tale of Aragorn and Arwen"

As told in "The Tale of Aragorn and Arwen", an appendix to The Lord of the Rings, in his twentieth year Aragorn met Arwen for the first time in Rivendell, where he lived under Elrond's protection. Arwen, then over 2,700 years old, had recently returned to her father's home after living with her grandmother, Galadriel, in Lothlórien. Aragorn fell in love with Arwen at first sight. Thirty years later, the two were reunited in Lothlórien. Arwen reciprocated Aragorn's love, and on the mound of Cerin Amroth they committed themselves to marrying each other. In making that choice, Arwen gave up the Elvish immortality available to her as a daughter of Elrond, and agreed to remain in Middle-earth instead of travelling to the Undying Lands. (Note: Tolkien 1955 Appendix A, part I (v) "The Tale of Aragorn and Arwen")

Arwen first appears in the text of The Lord of the Rings in Rivendell, shortly after Frodo Baggins wakes in the House of Elrond: she sits beside her father at the celebratory feast. (Note: Tolkien 1954a book 2, ch. 2 "The Council of Elrond") When the Fellowship of the Ring comes to Lothlórien, Aragorn remembers his earlier meeting with Arwen and pauses in reverence. (Note: Tolkien 1954a book 2, ch. 6 "Lothlórien")

Shortly before Aragorn takes the Paths of the Dead, he is joined by a contingent of his people accompanied by Arwen's brothers, Elladan and Elrohir, who bring him a gift from Arwen: a banner of black cloth. (Note: Tolkien 1955 book 5, ch. 2 "The Passing of the Grey Company") The banner is unfurled at the Battle of the Pelennor Fields to reveal the emblem of Elendil figured in mithril, gems, and gold; this becomes the first triumphant public announcement of the king's return. (Note: Tolkien 1955 book 5, ch. 6 "The Battle of the Pelennor Fields")

After the ring is destroyed, Aragorn becomes king of Arnor and Gondor. Arwen arrives at Minas Tirith, and they are married. (Note: Tolkien 1955 book 6, ch. 5 "The Steward and the King") She gives Frodo the Evenstar: her necklace with a white stone, to aid him when his injuries trouble him. (Note: Tolkien 1955 book 6, ch. 6 "Many Partings")

Arwen serves as inspiration and motivation for Aragorn, who must become King of both Arnor and Gondor before Elrond will allow her to marry him. "The Tale of Aragorn and Arwen" relates that Aragorn and Arwen had a son, Eldarion, and at least two unnamed daughters. One year after Aragorn's death, Arwen dies at the age of 2,901.

=== Relationships ===
Through her father, Elrond, Arwen was the granddaughter of Eärendil the Mariner (the second of the Half-elven), great-granddaughter of Tuor of Gondolin, and therefore a direct descendant of the ancient House of Hador. Through her great-grandmother, Idril, Arwen was a descendant of King Turgon of the Noldor. Through her mother, she was the granddaughter of the Elf-queen Galadriel of Lothlórien. (Note: Tolkien 1977 "Of the Rings of Power and the Third Age": Family Trees I and II: "The house of Finwë and the Noldorin descent of Elrond and Elros", and "The descendants of Olwë and Elwë") Through both of her parents, Arwen was a direct descendant of the ancient Elven House of Finwë. Furthermore, Arwen was a descendant of Beren and Lúthien, whose story resembled hers. Indeed, Arwen was held to be the reappearance in likeness of Lúthien, fairest of all the Elves, who was called Nightingale (Tinúviel).

Arwen was a distant relative of her husband Aragorn. Aragorn's ancestor, Elros Tar-Minyatur, the first King of Númenor, was her father Elrond's brother, who chose to live as a Man rather than as one of the Eldar. Arwen became Queen of the Reunited Kingdom of Arnor and Gondor when she married Aragorn, who was of the line of the Kings of Arnor. By their marriage, the lines of the Half-elven were reunited. Their union served, too, to unite and preserve the bloodlines of the three kings of the high Elves (Ingwë, Finwë, and the brothers Olwë and Elwë) as well as the only line with Maiarin blood through Arwen's great-great-great grandmother, Melian, Queen of Doriath. (Note: Tolkien 1955, Appendix A: Annals of the Kings and Rulers, I The Númenórean Kings)

Half-elven family tree (Note: Tolkien 1977, "Of the Rings of Power and the Third Age": Family Trees I and II: "The house of Finwë and the Noldorin descent of Elrond and Elros", and "The descendants of Olwë and Elwë")

Melian the Maia	Thingol of the Teleri	House of Bëor	House of Haleth	House of Hador	Finwë of the Noldor	Indis of the Vanyar	Olwë of the Teleri
Barahir	Belegund	Hareth	Galdor	Fingolfin	Finarfin	Eärwen
Lúthien	Beren	Rían	Huor	Húrin	Turgon	Elenwë
Dior	Nimloth	Tuor	Idril
Eluréd	Elurín	Elwing	Eärendil	Celeborn	Galadriel
Elros	Elrond	Celebrían
22 Kings of Númenor and Lords of Andúnië
Elendil
Isildur	Anárion
22 Kings of Arnor and Arthedain	27 Kings of Gondor
Arvedui	Fíriel
15 Dúnedain; Chieftains
Aragorn	Arwen	Elladan	Elrohir
Eldarion	daughters

Colour key:
Colour	Description
	Elves
	Men
	Maiar
	Half-elven
	Half-elven who chose the fate of Elves
	Half-elven who chose the fate of mortal Men

== Analysis ==
As related in The History of Middle-earth, Tolkien conceived the character of "Elrond's daughter" late in the writing. (Note: Tolkien 1990 p. 370 "Finduilas Elrond's daughter") (Note: Tolkien 1992 pp. 59, 66-67 "Many Partings") Prior to this, he had considered having Aragorn marry Éowyn of the royal family of Rohan.

Arwen is depicted as extremely beautiful; she is in Melissa Hatcher's view in Mythlore "a symbol of the unattainable, a perfect match for the unattainable Aragorn in Éowyn's eyes." Carol Leibiger wrote in the J.R.R. Tolkien Encyclopedia that Arwen's lack of involvement follows the general Elvish pattern, already established in The Silmarillion and continued in The Lord of the Rings, of retreating to safe havens.

The scholar of English literature Nancy Enright wrote that Arwen, like Christ, is an immortal who voluntarily chooses mortality out of love, in her case for Aragorn. She granted that Arwen is not a conspicuous character, and unlike Éowyn does not ride into battle, but stated that her inner power is "subtly conveyed" and present throughout the novel.

== Adaptations ==
=== Peter Jackson's film series ===
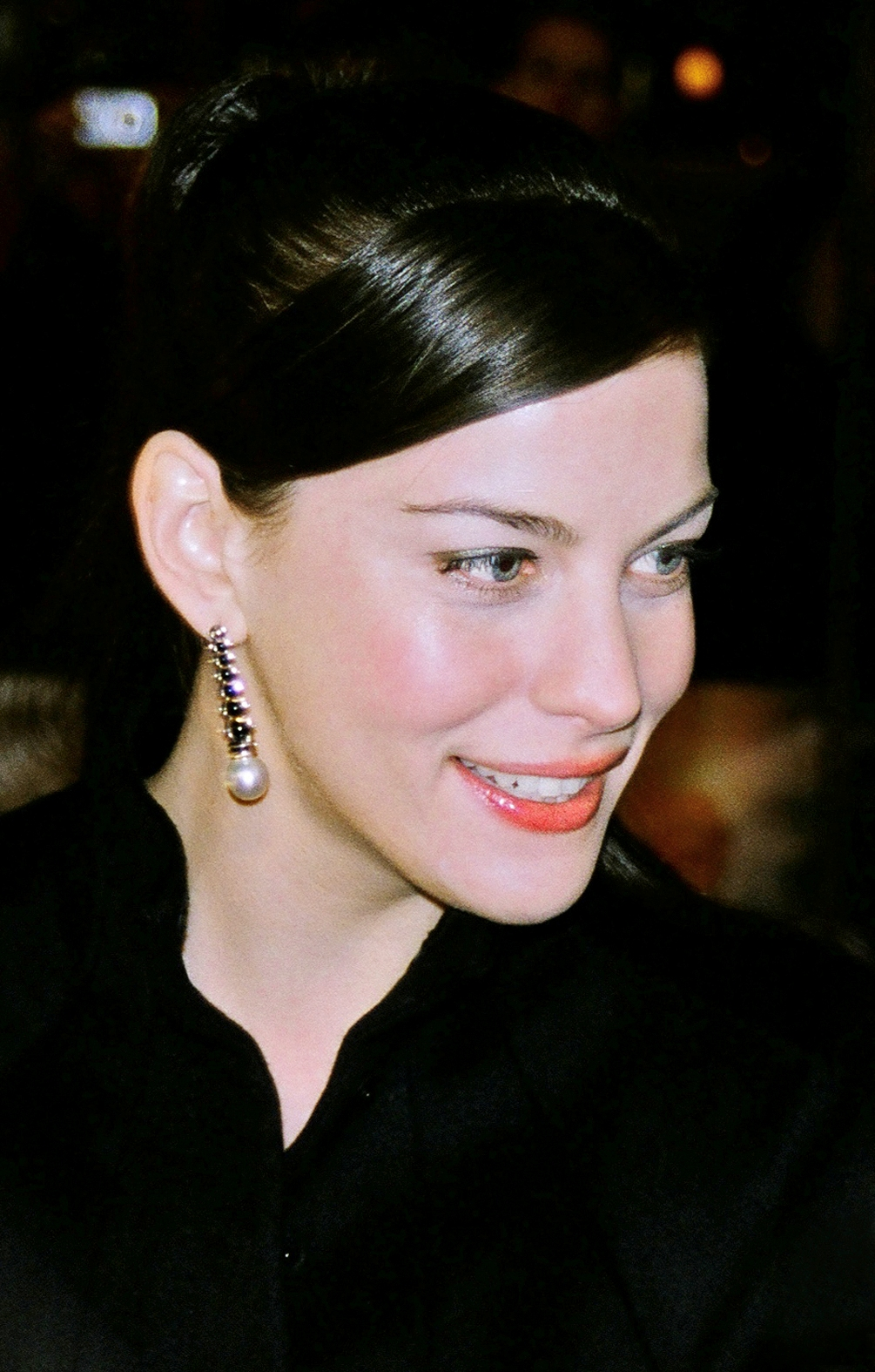
Liv Tyler plays Arwen in Peter Jackson's The Lord of the Rings film trilogy.

In Peter Jackson's The Lord of the Rings film trilogy, Arwen is played by Liv Tyler. The films give her a more prominent role than her literary counterpart. In the first film, Arwen searches for Aragorn and single-handedly rescues Frodo Baggins from the Black Riders at Bruinen, thwarting them with a sudden flood, summoned by an incantation. During this flight, Arwen wields the sword Hadhafang, which according to film merchandise was once wielded by her father and had belonged to his grandmother Idril Celebrindal.

In the film adaptation of The Two Towers, the injured Aragorn is revived by a dream or vision of Arwen, who kisses him and asks the Valar to protect him.

In the film, Arwen does not send Aragorn the banner she has made; instead, Elrond takes the sword Narsil, reforged as Andúril, to Aragorn at Dunharrow, and tells him that Arwen's fate has become bound to the One Ring, and that she is dying. The Tolkien scholar Janet Brennan Croft comments that Jackson makes Arwen passive, denying her independence of mind; from being a constant support, she is a distraction, even a temptation, to Aragorn, whom Croft likens to "the American Superhero", and their marriage, in the book a sign of his rightful kingship, is in the film something he accepts as if he was condemned to it.

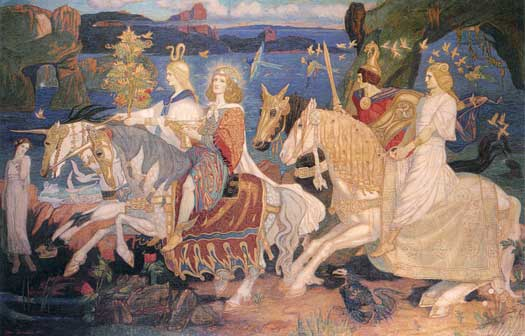
The film scene "Arwen's vision" borrows visually from Riders of the Sidhe by John Duncan, 1911.

In the extended version, Elrond asks Arwen, in Elvish with English subtitles, to accompany him to safety in Valinor, away from Middle-earth.

The Tolkien scholar Dimitra Fimi comments that the procession of Elves in the scene "Arwen's vision" in the extended version borrows visually from the "Celtic" imagery of John Duncan's 1911 Pre-Raphaelite painting Riders of the Sidhe. Sauron uses the Palantír to show Aragorn a dying Arwen (a scene from the future) in the hope of weakening his resolve.

The films portray Arwen as becoming human through her love for Aragorn; as in the novel, she follows the choice of her ancestor Lúthien to become a mortal woman for the love of a mortal man. The films introduce a jewelled pendant called the Evenstar which Arwen gives to Aragorn as a token of their love. A similar pendant appears in Marion Zimmer Bradley's short story The Jewel of Arwen, although in that story Arwen gives it to "the Ring-Bearer" rather than to Aragorn. (Note: This story appears in all the fantasy trilogies in the ISFDB list.) In Tolkien's novel, Arwen gives Frodo "a white gem like a star...hanging upon a silver chain" before he leaves Minas Tirith, saying, "When the memory of the fear and the darkness troubles you...this will bring you aid".

In earlier versions of the script, Arwen fought in the Battle of Helm's Deep and brought the sword Andúril to Aragorn. Some scenes of Arwen fighting in Helm's Deep were filmed before both the film's writers (with Liv Tyler's approval) reconsidered the change and deleted her from the sequence. The critic John D. Rateliff wrote approvingly of the deletion of what he calls "Arwen, Warrior Princess", even though it came "at the cost of reducing her to a sort of Lady of Shallott languishing for most of the final two films".

In the Mythopoeic Society's Tolkien on Film: Essays on Peter Jackson's The Lord of the Rings, Cathy Akers-Jordan, Victoria Gaydosik, Jane Chance, and Maureen Thum all contend that the portrayal of Arwen and other women in the Jackson films is thematically faithful to or compatible with Tolkien's writings, despite the differences.

=== Other ===
In the 1981 BBC radio serialisation of The Lord of the Rings, Arwen is voiced by Sonia Fraser. In the musical theatre adaptation of Lord of the Rings, Arwen, played in London in 2007 by Rosalie Craig, sings the Prologue, and three musical numbers: "The Song of Hope", "Star of Eärendil" (with the Elven chorus) and "The Song of Hope Duet" (with Aragorn). In the 2009 fan film The Hunt for Gollum, Arwen is played by Rita Ramnani.

The Lord of the Rings board game made use of a rendition of Arwen by Jackson's conceptual designer, the illustrator John Howe; the work was inspired by the French actress Isabelle Adjani.

== Sources ==
- Tolkien, J. R. R. (1954a). The Fellowship of the Ring. The Lord of the Rings. Boston: Houghton Mifflin. OCLC 9552942.
- Tolkien, J. R. R. (1955). The Return of the King. The Lord of the Rings. Boston: Houghton Mifflin. OCLC 519647821.
- Tolkien, J. R. R. (1977). Christopher Tolkien (ed.). The Silmarillion. Boston: Houghton Mifflin. ISBN 978-0-395-25730-2.
- Tolkien, J. R. R. (1989). Christopher Tolkien (ed.). The Treason of Isengard. Boston: Houghton Mifflin. ISBN 978-0-395-51562-4.
- Tolkien, J. R. R. (1990). Christopher Tolkien (ed.). The War of the Ring. Boston: Houghton Mifflin. ISBN 0-395-56008-X.
- Tolkien, J. R. R. (1992). Christopher Tolkien (ed.). Sauron Defeated. Boston, New York, & London: Houghton Mifflin. ISBN 0-395-60649-7.
