= Men in Middle-earth =

Humans in J. R. R. Tolkien's Middle-earth

In J. R. R. Tolkien's Middle-earth fiction, Man or Men denote humans, whether male or female, adult or child, in contrast to Elves, Hobbits, Dwarves, Orcs, and other sentient races. Men are described as the second or younger people, created after the Elves, and differing from them in being mortal. Along with Ents and Dwarves, these are the "free peoples" of Middle-earth, differing from the enslaved peoples such as Orcs.

Tolkien uses the Men of Middle-earth, interacting with immortal Elves, to explore a variety of themes in The Lord of the Rings, especially death and immortality. This appears throughout, but is the central theme of an appendix, "The Tale of Aragorn and Arwen". Where the Hobbits stand for simple, earthbound, comfort-loving people, Men are far more varied, from petty villains and slow-witted publicans to the gentle warrior Faramir and the genuinely heroic Aragorn; Tolkien had wanted to create a heroic romance suitable for the modern age. Scholars have identified real-world analogues for each of the varied races of Men, whether from medieval times or classical antiquity.

The weakness of Men, The Lord of the Rings asserts, is the desire for power; the One Ring promises enormous power, but is both evil and addictive. Tolkien uses Aragorn and the warrior Boromir, the two Men in the Fellowship that was created to destroy the Ring, to show opposite reactions to that temptation. It becomes clear that, except for Men, all the peoples of Middle-earth are dwindling and fading: the Elves are leaving, and the Ents are childless. By the Fourth Age, Middle-earth is peopled with Men, and indeed Tolkien intended it to represent the real world in the distant past.

Commentators have questioned Tolkien's attitude to race, given that 'good' Men are fair-skinned and live in the West, while their enemies are dark and live in the East and South. However, others note that Tolkien was strongly anti-racist in real life.

== In the fictional world ==
=== Creation ===
The race of Men in J. R. R. Tolkien's fictional world, in his books The Hobbit, The Lord of the Rings and The Silmarillion, is the second race of beings, the "younger children", created by the One God, Ilúvatar. Because they awoke in the First Age at the start of the Years of the Sun, long after the Elves, the Elves called them the "afterborn", or in Quenya the Atani, the "Second People". Like Elves, Men first awoke in the East of Middle-earth, spreading all over the continent and developing a variety of cultures and ethnicities. Unlike Tolkien's Elves, Men are mortal; when they die, they depart to a world unknown even to the godlike Valar.

=== Free peoples ===
Men are one of the four "free peoples" in the list-poem spoken by the Ent Treebeard; the others being Elves, Dwarves, and Ents. (Note: Tolkien 1954, book 3, ch. 4 "Treebeard") Hobbits, not included on that list, were a branch of the lineage of Men. (Note: Tolkien 1954a, "Prologue") (Note: Tolkien 1975, p. 162) (Note: Carpenter 2023, #131 to Milton Waldman, late 1951) Hobbits were not known to the Ents, but on meeting Merry and Pippin, Treebeard at once worked that people into the list.

The concept of the free peoples is shared by Elrond. (Note: Tolkien 1954a, book 2, ch. 3 "The Ring Goes South") The Tolkien scholar Paul H. Kocher writes that, in the style of the medieval Great Chain of Being, this list places Men and the other speaking peoples higher than the beasts, birds, and reptiles which he lists next. "Man the mortal, master of horses" is listed last among the free peoples, who were created separately.

=== Diversity ===
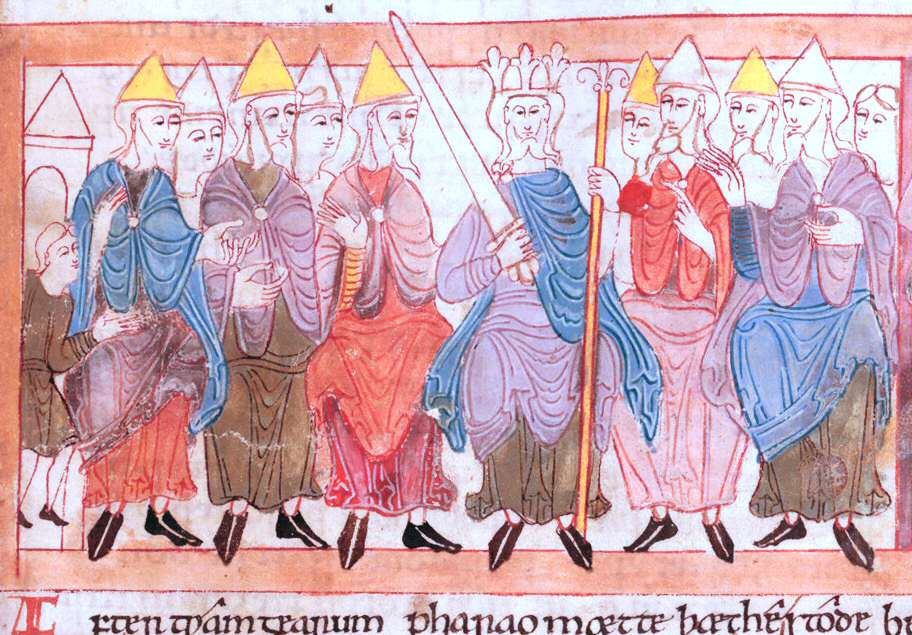
Tolkien modelled the Rohirrim, the Riders of Rohan, on the Anglo-Saxons (here in an 11th-century illustration).

Although all Men in Tolkien's legendarium are related to one another, there are many different groups with different cultures. Those on the side of the hobbits in The Lord of the Rings are the Dúnedain, the men who fought on the side of the Elves in the First Age against Morgoth in Beleriand, from whom other friendly groups, the Rangers including Aragorn, and the men of Gondor are descended; and their allies the Rohirrim.

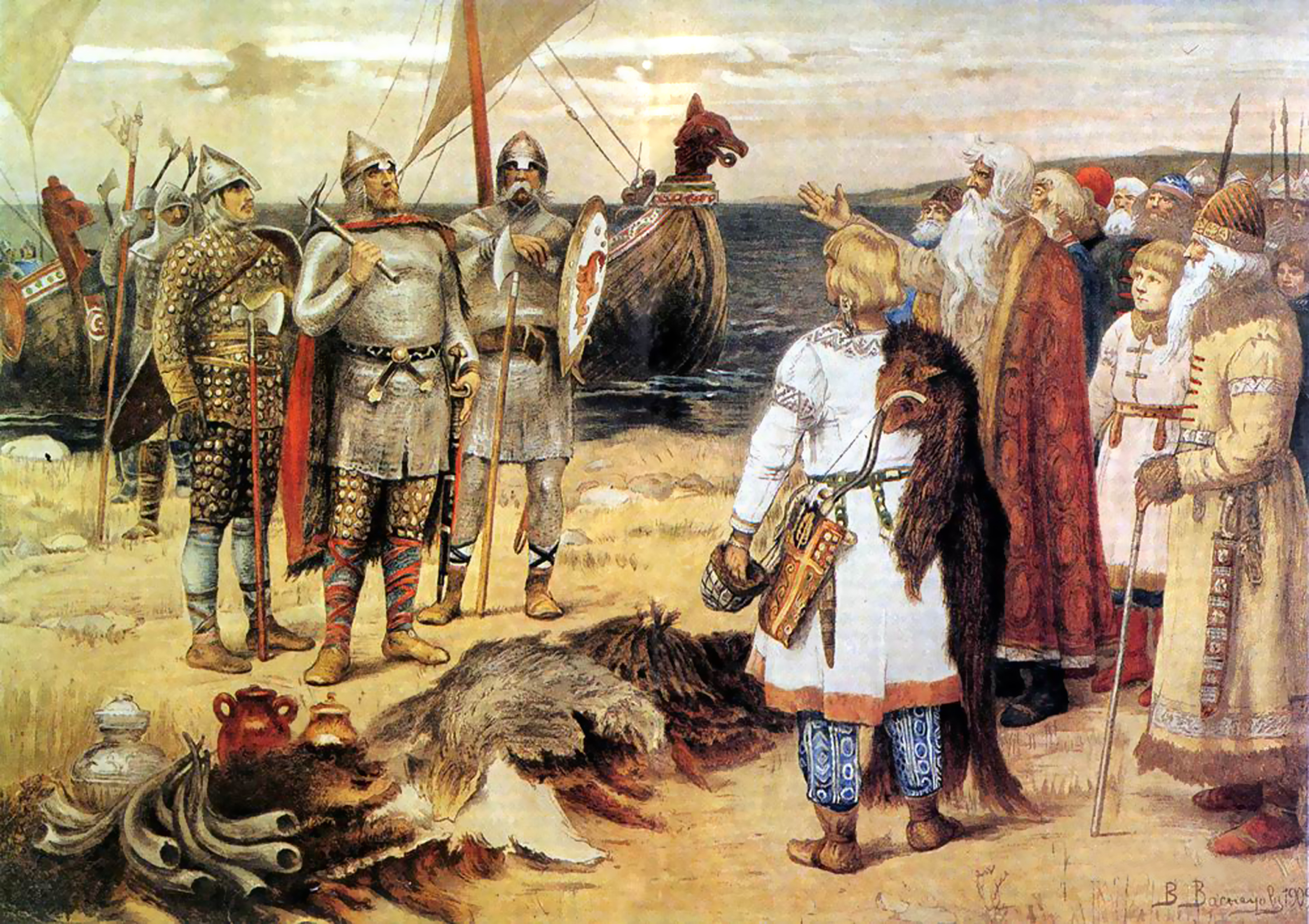
The Variags of Khand are named for the Varangians, medieval Germanic mercenaries. Painting by Viktor Vasnetsov

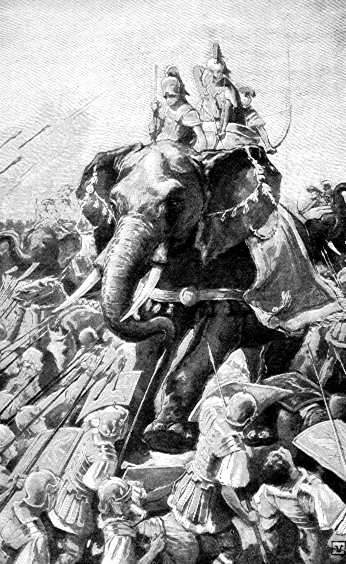
The Haradrim used battle-elephants, as Pyrrhus of Epirus did. Illustration by Helene Guerber

The main human adversaries in The Lord of the Rings are the Haradrim and the Easterlings. The Haradrim or Southrons were hostile to Gondor, and used elephants in war. Tolkien describes them as "swart", meaning "dark-skinned". The Easterlings lived in Rhûn, the vast eastern region of Middle-earth; they fought in the armies of Morgoth and Sauron. Tolkien describes them as "slant-eyed"; they ride horses or wagons, leading to the name "wain-riders". The Variags of Khand formed a third but smaller group, who appear as vassals of Mordor in the Battle of the Pelennor Fields. Their name is from Russian: Варяги (Variag), meaning the Varangians, Viking or other Germanic warriors who served as mercenaries. Other human adversaries include the Black Númenóreans, good men gone wrong; and the Corsairs of Umbar, rebels of Gondor.

Cultures of Men in the Third Age
Nation/group	Culture	Language	Real-world analogues
Bree (Note: Tolkien 1954a, book 1, ch. 9 "At the Sign of the Prancing Pony")	Village; agriculture; houses of wood, earth, stone	Westron	Medieval England
Beornings (Note: Tolkien 1937, ch. 7 "Queer Lodgings")	Wooden hall; beekeeping, dairy	Westron	Norse myth (Bödvar Bjarki); Beowulf
Dale (Note: Tolkien 1937, ch. 10 "A Warm Welcome")	Towns, trade, taverns	their own	Germanic medieval Europe
Drúedain (Note: Tolkien 1955, Book 5, ch. 3, "The Muster of Rohan") (Note: Tolkien 1955, Book 5, ch. 5, "The Ride of the Rohirrim"); Wild men, Púkel-men, Woses	Forest	their own	Wild man legends of medieval Europe
Dunlendings (Note: Tolkien 1955, b, Appendix F, "The Languages and Peoples of the Third Age"); Wild men of Dunland	Agriculture	Westron, Dunlendish	Celtic Britons
Easterlings (Note: Tolkien 1954, book 4, ch. 5 "The Window on the West"); People of Rhûn, Wainriders	Horses, war-wagons	their own	Huns
Gondor and the Dúnedain (Note: Tolkien 1955, book 5 ch. 1 "Minas Tirith")	Cities, stone architecture; literature, music	Westron, Sindarin, Quenya	Byzantine Empire, Ancient Egypt, Goths, Langobards
Haradrim (Note: Tolkien 1954, book 4, ch. 3 "The Black Gate is Closed"); Southrons	Desert; war-elephants; raiding in ships	their own	Enemies of Ancient Rome
Riders of Rohan (Note: Tolkien 1954, book 3, ch. 6 "The King of the Golden Hall")	Wooden mead-halls, agriculture, horsemanship	Rohirric, Westron	Anglo-Saxons, Goths
Variags of Khand (Note: Tolkien 1955, book 5, ch. 6 "The Battle of the Pelennor Fields")	Mercenaries	their own	Varangians

Sandra Ballif Straubhaar notes in The J. R. R. Tolkien Encyclopedia that Faramir, son of the Steward of Gondor, makes an "arrogant" speech, of which he later "has cause to repent", classifying the types of Men as seen by the Men of Númenórean origin at the end of the Third Age; she notes, too, that his taxonomy is probably not to be taken at face value.

Faramir's taxonomy of Men of Middle-earth
High Men Men of the West Númenóreans	Middle Men Men of the Twilight	Wild Men Men of the Darkness
The Three Houses of Edain who went to Númenor, and their descendants	Edain of other houses who stayed in Middle-earth; they became the barbarian nations of Rhovanion, Dale, the House of Beorn, and the Rohirrim.	All other Men, not connected to the Elves, including Easterlings and Dunlendings. (Note: It is unclear whether the friendly Lossoth (Snow-Men of the Ice Bay of Forochel) and Drúedain are part of this group.)

=== History ===
In a world with other intelligent and cultured races, Men in Middle-earth interact with each other and with the other races in a complex history, narrated mainly in The Silmarillion. Men are in general friendly with the other free peoples, especially Elves; they are implacable enemies of the enslaved peoples, especially Orcs. In the First Age, Men, the Edain, lived in Beleriand on the extreme West of Middle-earth. They form an alliance with the Elves and join a disastrous war against the first Dark Lord, Morgoth, which destroys Beleriand. As a reward for fighting in the war, the creator, Eru Iluvatar, gives the Edain the new island of Númenor as their home. (Note: Tolkien 1977, ch. 17 "Of the Coming of Men into the West" and subsequent chapters)

The key difference between Men and Elves now becomes central to the story: Elves are immortal, and return to Valinor, home of the godlike Valar, when they become weary of Middle-earth, or are killed in battle. Men, however, are mortal. Morgoth's servant, Sauron, tempts the Men of Númenor to attack Valinor, in their search for immortality: Sauron has falsely insinuated that Men can become immortal just by being in that place. The Men and Númenor are destroyed: the island is drowned, Atlantis-like, beneath the waves; the world is made round; and Valinor is removed from the world, so that only the Elves can reach it. Sauron's body is destroyed, but his spirit escapes to become the new Dark Lord of Middle-earth. A remnant of the Men of Númenor who remained faithful, under Elendil, sail to Middle-earth, where they found the kingdoms of Arnor in the North and Gondor in the South, remaining known as the Dúnedain, "Men of the West". Arnor becomes fragmented, and declines until its kings become Rangers in the wilds, but they retain their memory of Númenor or "Westernesse", through many generations down to Aragorn, a protagonist in The Lord of the Rings. The line of kings in Gondor eventually dies out, and the country is ruled by Stewards, the throne empty, until Aragorn returns.

=== Intermarriage and immortality ===
Tolkien stated that the core theme of The Lord of the Rings was death and the human desire to escape it. (Note: Carpenter 2023, #203 to Herbert Schiro, 17 November 1957) (Note: Carpenter 2023, #211 to Rhona Beare, 14 October 1958) The theme, which recurs throughout the work, is sharply visible in an appendix, "The Tale of Aragorn and Arwen", in which the immortal Elf Arwen chooses mortality so that she can marry the mortal Man Aragorn. The result, as with the earlier intermarriage of their ancestors Lúthien and Beren in the First Age in Beleriand, was to make Aragorn's line exceptionally long-lived among Men, and as the royal family intermarried with other people of Gondor, to maintain or extend the lifespan of the entire race. (Note: Tolkien 1955, Appendix A: "Annals of the Kings and Rulers": I "The Númenórean Kings": (v) "Here follows a part of the tale of Aragorn and Arwen")

=== Fading ===
Tolkien imagined Arda as the Earth in the distant past. With the loss of all its peoples except Man, and the reshaping of the continents, all that is left of Middle-earth is a dim memory in folklore, legend, and old words. Shapes of continents are purely schematic.

The overall feeling in The Lord of the Rings, however, despite the victories and Aragorn's long-awaited kingship and marriage, is of decline and fall, echoing the view of Norse mythology that everything will inevitably be destroyed. As the Tolkien scholar Marjorie Burns put it, "Here is a mythology where even the gods can die, and it leaves the reader with a vivid sense of life's cycles, with an awareness that everything comes to an end, that, though [the evil] Sauron may go, the elves will fade as well." This fits with Tolkien's equation of Middle-earth with the real Earth at some distant epoch in the past, and with his apparent intention to create a mythology for England. He could combine medieval myths and legends, hints from poems and nearly-forgotten names to build a world of Wizards and Elves, Dwarves, Rings of Power, Hobbits, Orcs, Trolls and Ringwraiths, and heroic Men with Elvish blood in their veins, and follow their history through long ages, provided that at the end he tore it all down again, leaving nothing, once again, but dim memories. By the end of The Lord of the Rings, the reader has learnt that the Elves have left for the Uttermost West, never to return, and that the other peoples, Dwarves, Hobbits, Ents and all the rest, are dwindling and fading, leaving only a world of Men.

Kocher writes that the furthest look into Man's future in The Lord of the Rings is the conversation between the Elf Legolas and the Dwarf Gimli, close friends, at the moment when they first visit Minas Tirith, the capital city of the Men of Gondor, "and see the marks of decay around them". Gimli says that the works of Men always "fail of their promise"; Legolas replies that even if that's so, "seldom do they fail of their seed", in marked contrast to the scarcity of children among Elves and Dwarves, implying that Men will outlast the other races. Gimli suggests again that Men's projects "come to naught in the end but might-have-beens". Legolas just replies "To that the Elves know not the answer". (Note: Tolkien 1955, book 5, ch. 9 "The Last Debate") Kocher comments that this "sad little fugue" is at variance with the hopeful tone of the rest of the work, remaining cheerful even in the face of apparently insuperable odds.

== Analysis ==
=== Ambition for power ===
Kocher writes that the Rings of Power reflected the characteristics of the race that was to wear them. Those for Men "stimulated and implemented their ambition for power". Whereas the tough Dwarves resisted Sauron's domination, and the Elves hid their Rings from him, with Men his plan "works perfectly", turning the ambitious kings into Ringwraiths, the nine Black Riders. With the One Ring to rule them, Sauron gains complete control over them, and they become his most powerful servants. Kocher comments that for Tolkien, the exercise of personal free will, the most precious gift, is "the distinguishing mark of his individuality". The wise, like the Wizard Gandalf and the Elf-queen Galadriel, therefore avoid putting pressure on anybody. In contrast, Sauron is evil exactly because he seeks to dominate the wills of others; the Ringwraiths, the nine fallen kings of Men, are the clearest exemplars of the process.

Kocher states that the leading Man in The Lord of the Rings is Aragorn, though critics often overlooked him in favour of Frodo as protagonist. Aragorn is one of two Men in the Fellowship of the Ring, the nine walkers from the Free Peoples opposed to the nine Black Riders. The other is Boromir, elder son of the Steward of Gondor, and the two Men are sharply opposed. Both are ambitious, and both intend one day to rule Gondor. Boromir means to fight valiantly, to save Gondor, with any help he can get, and to inherit the Stewardship. Aragorn knows he is in the line of kings by his ancestry, but he is unknown in Gondor. When they meet at the Council of Elrond, they dispute who has been holding back Sauron. Aragorn presents the shards of the broken sword of his ancestor, Elendil, and asks Boromir if he wants the House of Elendil (the line of kings) to return. Boromir evasively replies that he would welcome the sword. The One Ring is then shown to the Council. Boromir at once thinks of using it himself. Elrond explains how dangerous the Ring is; Boromir reluctantly sets the idea of using it aside for the moment, and suggests again that Elendil's sword might help save Gondor, if Aragorn is strong enough. Aragorn replies gracefully to the tactless suggestion. Kocher comments that by being both bold and tactful, Aragorn has won all that he wanted from Boromir: the sword is genuine, as is Aragorn's claim to own it, and he has been invited back to Gondor. The Fellowship set off, temporarily united; when they reach Parth Galen, Boromir tries to seize the Ring from Frodo, causing Frodo to use the Ring to escape; the Fellowship is scattered. Orcs attack, seeking the Ring; Boromir repents, and dies trying to save the Hobbits, an act which redeems him. Aragorn gives Boromir an honourable boat-funeral. The quest eventually succeeds, and Aragorn, growing in strength through many perils and wise decisions is crowned King. Boromir gave in to the temptation of power, and fell; Aragorn responded rightfully, and rose. (Note: Tolkien 1954a, book 2, ch. 2 "The Council of Elrond")

=== Race ===
The status of the friendly races has been debated by critics. David Ibata, writing in The Chicago Tribune, asserts that the protagonists in The Lord of the Rings all have fair skin, and they are mainly blond-haired and blue-eyed as well. Ibata suggests that having the "good guys" white and their opponents of other races, in both book and film, is uncomfortably close to racism. The theologian Fleming Rutledge states that the leader of the Drúedain, Ghân-buri-Ghân, is treated as a noble savage. Michael N. Stanton writes in The J. R. R. Tolkien Encyclopedia that Hobbits were "a distinctive form of human beings", and notes that their speech contains "vestigial elements" which hint that they originated in the North of Middle-earth.

The scholar Margaret Sinex states that Tolkiens' construction of the Easterlings and Southrons draws on centuries of Christian tradition of creating an "imaginary Saracen". Zakarya Anwar judges that while Tolkien himself was anti-racist, his fantasy writings can certainly be taken the wrong way.

With his different races of Men arranged from good in the West to evil in the East, simple in the North and sophisticated in the South, Tolkien had, in the view of John Magoun, constructed a "fully expressed moral geography": Gondor is both virtuous, being West, and has problems, being South; Mordor in the Southeast is hellish, while Harad in the extreme South "regresses into hot savagery". The film-maker Andrew Stewart, writing in CounterPunch, concurs that the geography of Middle-earth deliberately pits the good Men of the West against the evil Men and Orcs of the East.

Peter Jackson, in his The Lord of the Rings film trilogy, clothes the Haradrim in long red robes and turbans, and has them riding their elephants, giving them the look in Ibata's opinion of "North African or Middle Eastern tribesmen". Ibata notes that the film companion book, The Lord of the Rings: Creatures, describes them as "exotic outlanders" inspired by "12th century Saracen warriors". Jackson's Easterling soldiers are covered in armour, revealing only their "coal-black eyes" through their helmet's eye-slits. Ibata comments that they look Asian, their headgear recalling both Samurai helmets and conical "Coolie" hats.

=== From "clod" to hero ===
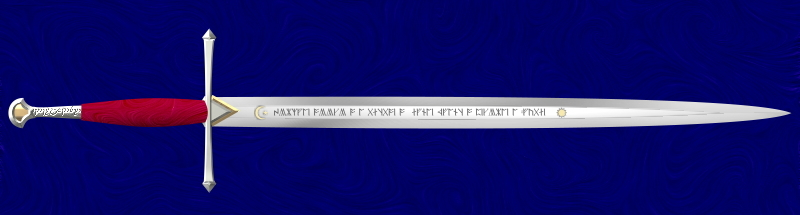
A sword fit for a hero: Andúril, "Flame of the West" is forged anew, "for Aragorn son of Arathorn was going to war upon the marches of Mordor". (Note: Tolkien 1954a, book 2, ch. 3, "The Ring Goes South")

The Tolkien scholar Deborah C. Rogers compares the Men of The Lord of the Rings with the Hobbits. She notes that the Hobbits are to an extent the low, simple, earthbound "clods" of the story who like beer and comfort and do not wish to go on adventures; (Note: Rogers admits, though, that sometimes, as Gandalf said of Bilbo and Frodo, there is "more to them than meets the eye".) they fit the antihero of modern literature and Northrop Frye's lower literary modes including various forms of humour.

In contrast, Tolkien's Men are not all of a piece: Rogers mentions the "petty villain", Bill Ferny; the "loathsome" Grima Wormtongue; the "slow-thinking" publican Barliman Butterbur of Bree; "that portrait of damnation", Denethor, Steward of Gondor; and at the upper end of the scale, the kingly Théoden, brought back to life from Wormtongue's corruption; the "gentle warrior" Faramir and his brother the hero-villain Boromir; and finally the ranger Aragorn, who becomes king.

Aragorn is the opposite of hobbitish: tall, not provincial, untroubled by the discomforts of the wild. At the start, in Bree, he appears as a Ranger of the North, a weatherbeaten man named Strider. Gradually the reader discovers he is heir to the throne of Gondor, engaged to be married to Arwen, an Elf-woman. Equipped with a named magical sword, he emerges as an unqualified hero, in Frye's "High Mimetic" or "Romantic" literary mode, making the whole novel indeed a heroic romance: he regains his throne, marries Arwen, and has a long, peaceful, and happy reign.
