= Unfinished Tales =

Writings by J. R. R. Tolkien

Unfinished Tales of Númenor and Middle-earth
- Cover of the first edition depicting Tolkien's drawing of a Númenórean helmet
- Editor: Christopher Tolkien
- Author: J. R. R. Tolkien
- Illustrator: Christopher Tolkien (maps)
- Cover artist: J. R. R. Tolkien
- Language: English
- Subject: Tolkien's legendarium
- Genre: Fantasy
- Publisher: George Allen & Unwin
- Publication date: 1980
- Publication place: United Kingdom
- Media type: Print (Hardcover and Paperback)
- ISBN: 9780048231796
- Preceded by: The Silmarillion
- Followed by: The Letters of J. R. R. Tolkien

Unfinished Tales of Númenor and Middle-earth is a collection of stories and essays by J. R. R. Tolkien that were never completed during his lifetime, but were edited by his son Christopher Tolkien and published in 1980. Many of the tales within are retold in The Silmarillion, albeit in modified forms; the work also contains a summary of the events of The Lord of the Rings told from a less personal perspective.

The collection received a cautious welcome from scholars and critics. They noted Christopher Tolkien's warning that a good knowledge of the background was needed to gain much from the stories. Others noted that the stories were among the best of Tolkien's writing; Warren Dunn expressed a wish for the whole of the history in such a format. The book, with its commentary, was commercially successful, indicating a market for more of Tolkien's work and leading to the 12-volume The History of Middle-earth.

On "The Quest of Erebor" in Part Three, Christine Barkley comments that the perspective is the knowledgeable Gandalf's, contrasting sharply with the Hobbit Bilbo Baggins's narrower point of view in The Hobbit. Peter Jackson used the story to enrich the narrative for his 2013 film The Desolation of Smaug.

== Overview ==
Christopher Tolkien explains that "Unfinished" has three meanings for his tales, namely a (possibly well-polished) text coming to an abrupt halt, consisting of a series of fragments, or not having any settled definition.

Unlike The Silmarillion, also published posthumously (in 1977), for which the narrative fragments were modified to connect them into a consistent and coherent work, the Unfinished Tales are presented as Tolkien left them, with little more than names changed (the author having had a confusing habit of trying out different names for a character while writing a draft). Thus some of these are incomplete stories, while others are collections of information about Middle-earth. Each tale is followed by a long series of notes explaining inconsistencies and obscure points.

As with The Silmarillion, Tolkien's son Christopher edited and published Unfinished Tales long before he had finished his study of the materials in his father's archive. Unfinished Tales provides more detailed information about characters, events and places mentioned only briefly in The Lord of the Rings. Versions of such tales, including the origins of Gandalf and the other Istari (Wizards), the death of Isildur and the loss of the One Ring in the Gladden Fields, and the founding of the kingdom of Rohan, help expand knowledge about Middle-earth.

The commercial success of Unfinished Tales demonstrated that the demand for Tolkien's stories several years after his death was not only present but growing. Encouraged by the result, Christopher Tolkien embarked upon the more ambitious twelve-volume work entitled The History of Middle-earth, which encompasses nearly the entire corpus of his father's writings about Middle-earth.

== Contents ==
=== Part One: The First Age ===
- "Of Tuor and his Coming to Gondolin", an account of the central character of The Fall of Gondolin
- "Narn i Hîn (Note: In the published Silmarillion and Unfinished Tales, the title of the Narn is given as "Narn i Hîn Húrin". This was an editorial decision by Christopher Tolkien which he later regretted, done only to prevent people from pronouncing Chîn like English "chin" with a voiceless palato-alveolar affricate, rather than a voiceless palatal fricative as in the German dich or the initial sound of the English word huge.) Húrin (The Tale of the Children of Húrin)" is a long story of what happened to Húrin and his children Túrin Turambar and Nienor, after Húrin was cursed by the Dark Lord Morgoth. The story elaborates on what is told of these characters in the published Silmarillion, starting with the childhood of Túrin, continuing through the captivity of his father in the Nírnaeth Arnoediad, and Túrin's exile in Doriath, to Túrin's time in Nargothrond, his incestuous relationship with his sister Nienor, and ultimately ending with suicide by his sword after killing the dragon who caused many of his troubles. A shorter version is given in The Silmarillion as the chapter "Of Túrin Turambar". A complete version is published in the 2007 The Children of Húrin.

=== Part Two: The Second Age ===
- "A Description of the Island of Númenor", an account of the Atlantis-like island that supported a proud civilisation of Men
- "Aldarion and Erendis: The Mariner's Wife", a tale of a King of Númenor who was more interested in the stars and voyaging than ruling a country, provoking a split with his father Tar-Meneldur.
- "The Line of Elros: Kings of Númenor", a chronicle listing all the Kings of Númenor from its foundation to its destruction
- "The History of Galadriel and Celeborn", a group of texts related to Galadriel's origins and exile

=== Part Three: The Third Age ===
- "The Disaster of the Gladden Fields", an account of how Isildur came to be killed in the River Anduin, and the One Ring lost
- "Cirion and Eorl and the Friendship of Gondor and Rohan", an account of the relationship of those two peoples; it is an extract from "The Rivers and Beacon-Hills of Gondor".
- "The Quest of Erebor" has Gandalf narrate to Frodo Baggins how and why he arranged for the retaking of the Lonely Mountain (Erebor in Sindarin), resulting in the adventure told in The Hobbit. It was written long after that book had been published, sometime after Tolkien had the page proofs for The Fellowship of the Ring.
- "The Hunt for the Ring", an account of how Sauron's Black Riders searched for the One Ring between the time that Sauron released Gollum and the time that Frodo left the Shire, with details of other versions of the story, and details of the Wizards Gandalf and Saruman and their interest in the Shire.
- "The Battles of the Fords of Isen", an account of two battles in Rohan, when the King's son Théodred was killed defending the Fords of Isen from Saruman's Orcs just before the Battle of Helm's Deep.

=== Part Four ===
- "The Drúedain", an account of the wild men of the woods
- "The Istari", an account of the Wizards sent to Middle-earth
- "The Palantíri", an account of the magical seeing stones

== Analysis ==
=== General ===
Navigable diagram of Tolkien's legendarium. Unfinished Tales stands outside Christopher Tolkien's 12-volume The History of Middle-earth (blue Roman numerals I..XII), though the tales relate to several parts of the legendarium (brown boxes), and variable amounts of editorial commentary are provided.

The scholar Paul H. Kocher, reviewing Unfinished Tales in Mythlore, noted that all the stories are linked to either The Silmarillion, Akallabeth or The Lord of the Rings, and extensively annotated, mainly by Christopher Tolkien. In Kocher's view, the stories contain "some of Tolkien's best writing" (and he summarized them in some detail), though he found much of interest in the editorial material also. He noted the revised map with the additional place names used in the tales, and that the book does not address Tolkien's poetry.

The independent scholar Douglas C. Kane writes that Christopher Tolkien chose to include not just narrative tales, despite the book's title, but "a taste of some of the descriptive and historical underpinnings of those heretofore uncharted vistas", and that indeed he suggested he might "dive even deeper into the history of his father's legendarium", as he eventually did with his 12-volume The History of Middle-earth. The Tolkien scholar Corey Olsen notes that Christopher Tolkien chose to present the incomplete tales as they were, adding a commentary to help readers grasp how they fitted into his father's Middle-earth legendarium. Olsen comments that the book's commercial success demonstrated the existence of a market for more of Tolkien's writings, opening up a route to publication of The History of Middle-earth.

The Christian philosopher Peter Kreeft wrote in Christianity & Literature that many readers had felt disappointed by Unfinished Tales, as some had felt about The Silmarillion. Perry Bramlett adds that the book is not for the reader new to Tolkien, nor even one who has read only The Hobbit "or perhaps some or even all of the Lord of the Rings." He notes Christopher Tolkien's warning that the stories "constitute no whole" and that much of the content "will be found unrewarding" to those without a good knowledge of Lord of the Rings. More positively, he cites David Bratman's comment that much of it is as well-crafted as any of Tolkien's writings, and that readers who found The Silmarillion "a little too high and distant" would welcome it.

The science fiction author Warren Dunn, writing in 1993, described the book as engaging, and that every section contained "something of interest", but he cautioned that it required "an intimate knowledge" of The Silmarillion, The Lord of the Rings, and its appendices "for full enjoyment" of the book. He commented that "I really do wish we could have seen the whole history like this, even if it took up twelve volumes to get through the first, second and third ages before the Lord of the Rings!"

=== "The Quest of Erebor" ===
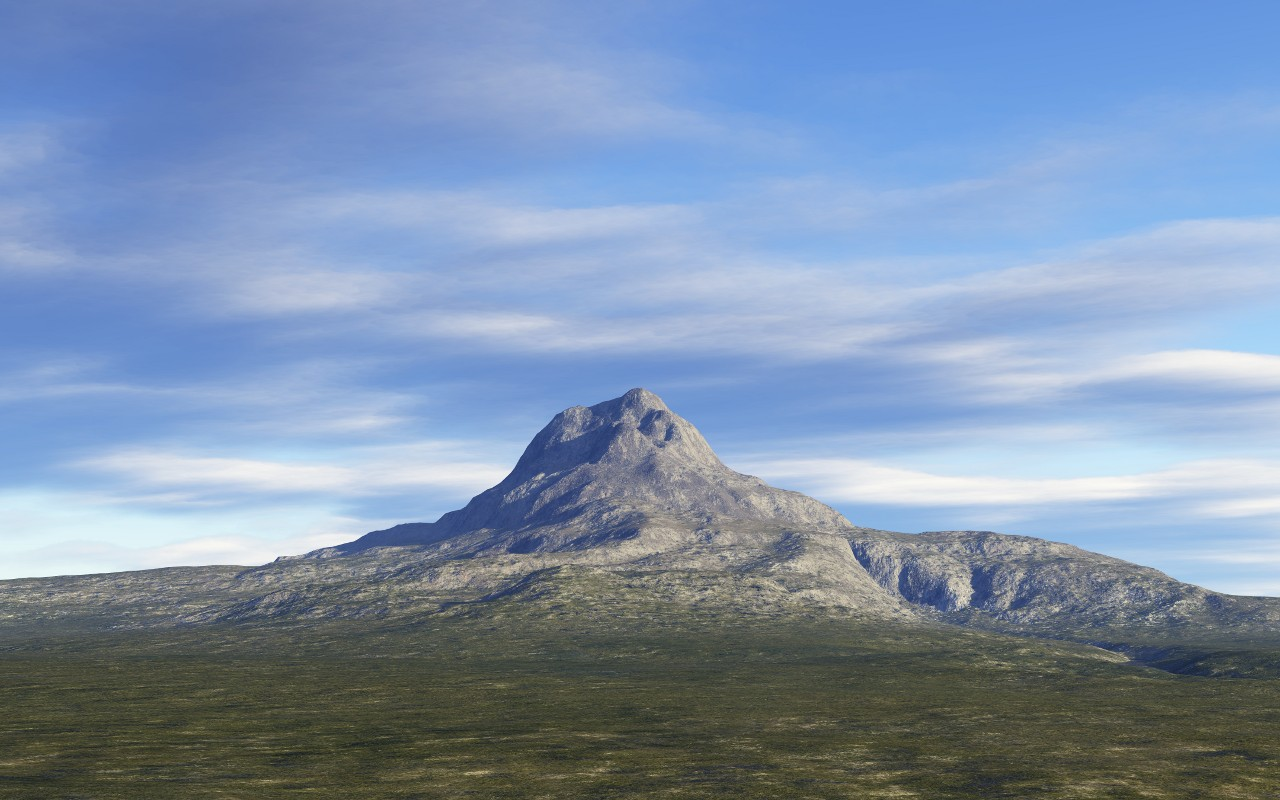
Artist's depiction of Erebor, the object of the quest

Christine Barkley, writing in Mythlore, notes that the point of view in The Quest of Erebor is Gandalf's, sharply contrasting with Bilbo's far less well-informed point of view in The Hobbit. That book, she states, uses a third-person, limited-knowledge narrator, supposedly written from Bilbo's diary after the adventure. Where Bilbo is interested in food and comfort, and sometimes other familiar things such as riddles, she writes, Gandalf is concerned with defending the West against the Shadow (Sauron). Further, the Quest actually pretends to be Frodo's memory of a conversation he had with Gandalf, rather than Gandalf actually writing, so there is uncertainty about how much of what Gandalf said may have been recorded. And when Frodo asks if he has now heard the full story, Gandalf replies "Of course not", so the narration is explicitly incomplete. From the reader's point of view, the point of the story is to explain how The Hobbit fits into the background of The Lord of the Rings, or more precisely, in Barkley's words, "why Bilbo was included in the dwarves' plans at Gandalf's suggestion."

Frank P. Riga and colleagues, also in Mythlore, write that Peter Jackson used the Quest to enrich the story when transforming The Hobbit from novel to film for his 2013 film adaptation, The Desolation of Smaug. Among other things, the film opens with the meeting between Gandalf and Thorin at The Prancing Pony. Elements of Gandalf's motivations and previous discussions with Thorin also find their way into the 2012 film An Unexpected Journey as dialogue, particularly in the meeting held in Bilbo's house. In their view, the Quest "closely and thoroughly connects the action of The Hobbit with the larger, cosmic concerns of its sequel, showing how the Dwarves' struggle to regain their homeland became crucial in frustrating Sauron's plan to attack Lorien and Rivendell." They explain that the quest had to succeed, or the actions described in The Lord of the Rings could not have occurred. Jackson used the connections, they state; for instance, making Saruman order Gandalf to stop the quest, and making Gandalf refuse, supported by Galadriel.

== Sources ==
- Tolkien, J. R. R. (1980). Christopher Tolkien (ed.). Unfinished Tales. Boston: Houghton Mifflin. ISBN 978-0-395-29917-3.
