= The Fellowship of the Ring =

1954 part of novel by J. R. R. Tolkien

- First edition, with Tolkien's artwork
- Author: J. R. R. Tolkien
- Language: English
- Series: The Lord of the Rings
- Genre: Fantasy
- Set in: Middle-earth
- Publisher: George Allen & Unwin
- Publication date: 29 July 1954
- Publication place: United Kingdom
- Pages: 423 (first edition)
- OCLC: 12228601
- Dewey Decimal: 823.914
- LC Class: PR6039.032 L67 1954, vol.1
- Followed by: The Two Towers

The Fellowship of the Ring is the first of three volumes of the epic novel The Lord of the Rings by the English author J. R. R. Tolkien; it is followed by The Two Towers and The Return of the King. The action takes place in the fictional universe of Middle-earth. The first edition was published on 29 July 1954 in the United Kingdom, and consists of a foreword in which the author discusses the writing of The Lord of the Rings, a prologue titled "Concerning Hobbits, and other matters", and the main narrative divided into two "books".

Scholars and critics have remarked upon the narrative structure of the first part of the volume, which involves comfortable stays at five "Homely Houses", (Note: Namely, Bag End, Crickhollow, Bombadil's, Bree, and Rivendell) alternating with episodes of danger. Different reasons for the structure have been proposed, including deliberate construction of a cosy world, laboriously groping for a story, or Tolkien's work habits, which involved continual rewriting. The second chapter of each book, "The Shadow of the Past" and "The Council of Elrond", stand out from the rest and have attracted scholarly discussion. They consist not of a narrative of action centred on the Hobbits, but of exceptionally long flashback narrated by the wise old wizard Gandalf. Tolkien called "The Shadow of the Past" the "crucial chapter" as it changes the tone of the book, and lets both the protagonist Frodo and the reader know that there will be a quest to destroy the One Ring. "The Council of Elrond" has been called a tour de force, presenting a culture-clash of the modern with the ancient.

The volume was in the main praised by reviewers and authors including Tolkien's contemporaries W. H. Auden and Naomi Mitchison on its publication, though the critic Edmund Wilson attacked it in a 1956 review entitled "Oo, Those Awful Orcs!".

== Title and publication ==
Tolkien envisioned The Lord of the Rings as a single-volume work divided into six sections he called "books", along with extensive appendices. The original publisher decided to split the work into three parts. Before this, Tolkien had hoped to publish the novel in one volume, possibly combined with The Silmarillion. (Note: The negotiations between Tolkien and Allen & Unwin over the publication of The Lord of the Rings, and the possibility of including The Silmarillion (which was still incomplete), are covered passim in the entries for 1950 through 1952 in Hammond & Scull's Chronology. Several of Tolkien's letters of that period touch on this matter, especially #124, in which Tolkien explicitly desires to have the works published together.) However, he had proposed titles for the six books that make up the novel. Of the two books that comprise what became The Fellowship of the Ring the first was to be called The First Journey or The Ring Sets Out. The name of the second was The Journey of the Nine Companions or The Ring Goes South. The titles The Ring Sets Out and The Ring Goes South were used in the Millennium edition.

== Contents ==
The volume contains a prologue for readers who have not read The Hobbit, and background information to set the stage for the novel. The body of the volume consists of Book One: "The Ring Sets Out", and Book Two: "The Ring Goes South".

=== Prologue ===
The prologue explains that the work is "largely concerned with hobbits", telling of their origins in a migration from the east, their habits such as smoking "pipe-weed", and how their homeland the Shire is organised. It explains how the narrative follows on from The Hobbit, (Note: To make this possible, Tolkien modified the account of Bilbo's finding of the Ring in The Hobbit from the Ring's innocent status in the first edition.) in which the Hobbit Bilbo Baggins finds the One Ring, which had been in the possession of Gollum.

=== Book I: The Ring Sets Out ===
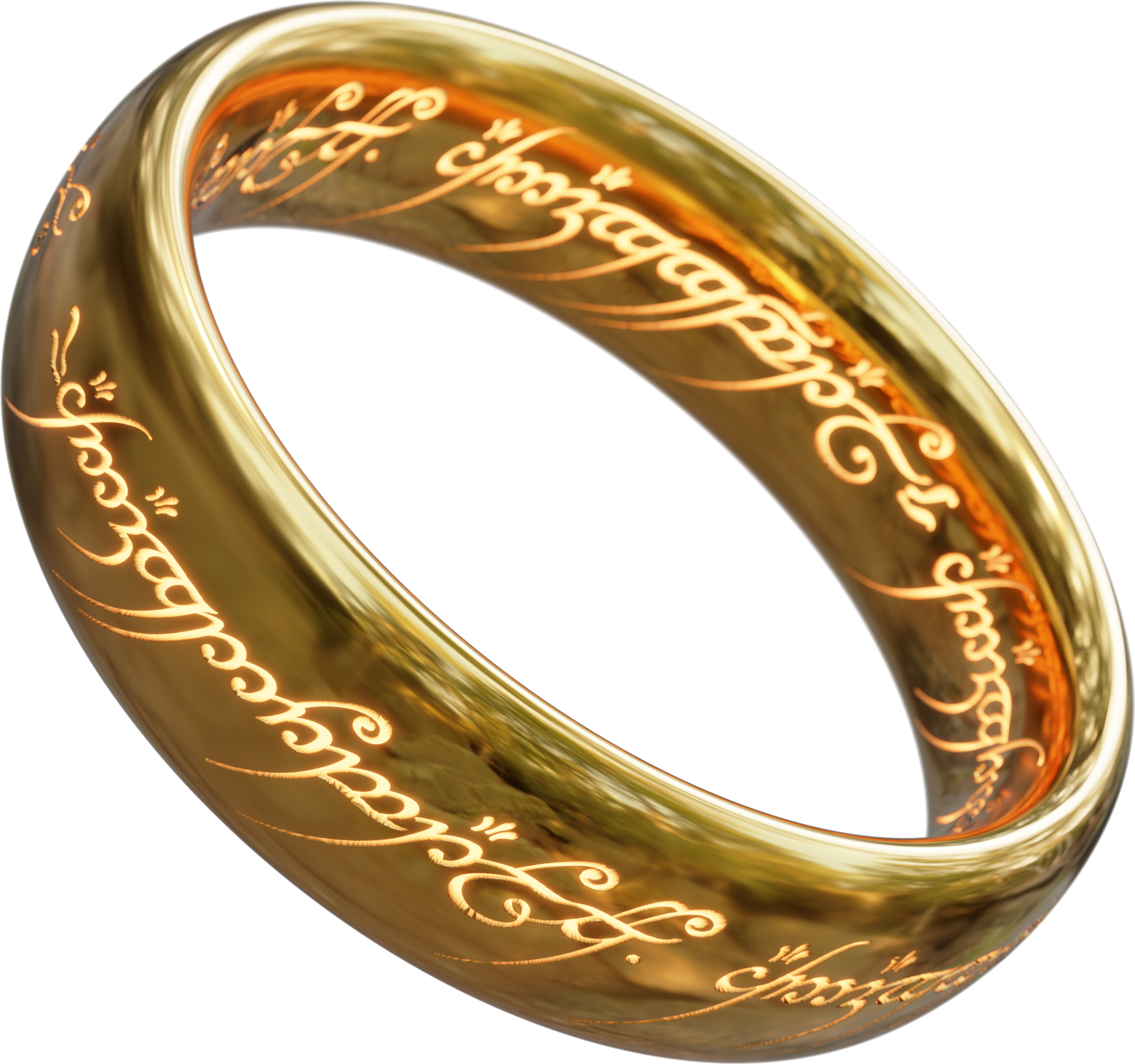
Gandalf proves that Frodo's Ring is the One Ring by throwing it into Frodo's fireplace, revealing the hidden text of the Rhyme of the Rings.

Bilbo celebrates his eleventy-first (111th) birthday and leaves the Shire suddenly, passing the Ring to Frodo Baggins, his cousin (Note: Although Frodo refers to Bilbo as his "uncle", the character is introduced in "A Long-expected Party" as one of Bilbo's younger cousins. The two were in fact first and second cousins, once removed either way (his paternal great-great-uncle's son's son and his maternal great-aunt's son).) and heir. Neither Hobbit is aware of the Ring's origin, but Gandalf (a wizard) suspects it is a Ring of Power. Seventeen years later, in "The Shadow of the Past", Gandalf confirms to Frodo that the Ring is the powerfully seductive Ruling Ring lost by the Dark Lord Sauron long ago and counsels Frodo to take it away from the Shire. Gandalf leaves, promising to return by Frodo's birthday and accompany Frodo on his journey, but fails to do so.

Frodo sets out on foot, offering a cover story of moving to a little house in the village of Crickhollow, accompanied by his gardener Sam Gamgee and Frodo's cousin Pippin Took. They are pursued by mysterious Black Riders, but meet a passing group of Elves led by Gildor Inglorion, whose singing to Elbereth wards off the Riders. The Hobbits spend the night with them, then take an evasive shortcut the next day, and arrive at the farm of Farmer Maggot, who takes them to Bucklebury Ferry, where they meet their friend Merry Brandybuck. When they reach the house at Crickhollow, Merry and Pippin reveal they know about the Ring and insist on travelling with Frodo and Sam.

They decide to try to shake off the Black Riders by cutting through the Old Forest. Merry and Pippin are trapped by Old Man Willow, an ancient tree-spirit who controls much of the forest, but are rescued by Tom Bombadil. Leaving the refuge of Tom's house, they get lost in a fog and are caught by a barrow-wight in a barrow on the downs, but Frodo, awakening from the barrow-wight's spell, calls Tom Bombadil, who frees them and equips them with ancient swords from the barrow-wight's hoard.

The Hobbits reach the village of Bree, where they encounter a Ranger named Strider. Frodo draws attention to himself and the Ring when it slips onto his finger, making him suddenly invisible in the crowded inn. The innkeeper gives Frodo a letter from Gandalf written three months before, identifying Strider as a friend. Knowing the riders will attempt to attack the party, Strider guides the Hobbits through the wilderness toward the Elven sanctuary of Rivendell. On the way, the group stops at Weathertop, a hill. While there, they are attacked by five of the Black Riders. Their leader wounds Frodo with a cursed blade. After fighting them off, Strider treats Frodo with the herb athelas, and is joined by the Elf Glorfindel, who has been searching for the party. Glorfindel rides with Frodo, now deathly ill, toward Rivendell. The Black Riders pursue Frodo, but when they enter the Ford of Bruinen, they are swept away by flood waters summoned by Elrond.

=== Book II: The Ring Goes South ===
Frodo recovers in Rivendell under Elrond's care. Gandalf informs Frodo that the Black Riders are the Nazgûl, Men from ancient times enslaved by Rings of Power to serve Sauron. The Council of Elrond discusses the history of Sauron and the Ring. Strider is revealed to be Aragorn, the heir of Isildur. Isildur had cut the One Ring from Sauron's hand in the battle ending the Second Age, but refused to destroy it, claiming it for himself. The Ring had been lost when Isildur was killed, finally ending up in Bilbo's possession after his meeting with Gollum, described in The Hobbit. Gandalf reports that the chief wizard, Saruman, has betrayed them and is now working to become a power in his own right. Gandalf was captured by him, but escaped, explaining why he had failed to return to meet Frodo as he had promised.

The Council decides that the Ring must be destroyed, but that can be done only by sending it to the fire of Mount Doom in Mordor where it was forged. Frodo takes this task upon himself. Elrond, with the advice of Gandalf, chooses companions for him. The Fellowship of the Ring consists of nine walkers who set out on the quest to destroy the One Ring, in opposition to the nine Black Riders: Frodo Baggins, Sam Gamgee, Merry Brandybuck and Pippin Took; Gandalf; the Men Aragorn and Boromir, son of the Steward of Gondor; the Elf Legolas; and the Dwarf Gimli. The Fellowship thus represents the Free Peoples of the West – Elves, Dwarves, Men, and Hobbits, assisted by a Wizard.

After a failed attempt to cross the Misty Mountains over the Redhorn Pass, the Fellowship take the perilous path through the Mines of Moria. They learn that Balin, one of the Dwarves who accompanied Bilbo in The Hobbit, and his colony of Dwarves were killed by Orcs. After surviving an attack, they are pursued by Orcs and a Balrog, an ancient fire demon from a prior Age. Gandalf confronts the Balrog, and both of them fall into the abyss of Moria. The others escape and find refuge in the timeless Elven forest of Lothlórien, where they are counselled by the Lady Galadriel. Before they leave, Galadriel tests their loyalty, and gives them individual, magical gifts to help them on their quest. She allows Frodo and Sam to look into her fountain, the Mirror of Galadriel, to see unexplained visions of the past and the present, and possibly unreal glimpses of the future. She refuses to take the Ring Frodo offers her, knowing that it would master her.

Galadriel's husband Celeborn gives the Fellowship boats, elven cloaks, and waybread (Lembas), and they travel down the River Anduin to the hill of Amon Hen. There, Boromir tries to take the Ring from Frodo, but immediately regrets it after Frodo puts on the Ring and disappears. Frodo chooses to go alone to Mordor, but Sam, guessing what he intends, intercepts him as he tries to take a boat across the river, and goes with him.

== Structure ==
The volume contains three types of narrative structure, not found in the rest of the novel, that have attracted the notice of Tolkien scholars and critics. Firstly, the Hobbit protagonists, having set out on their adventures, repeatedly return to "Homely Houses", comfortable and safe places where they recuperate. Secondly, Frodo many times confers and eats with an advisor (not necessarily in a "Homely House"), then makes a clumsy journey in the face of a danger, then encounters unexpected help. Thirdly, the volume switches between action into two exceptionally long chapters of flashback narrative, both critically important for the novel as a whole.

=== Frodo's five "Homely Houses" ===
==== "Groping for a story" ====
In 1982, the Tolkien scholar Tom Shippey noticed the alternation at the start of The Lord of the Rings between moments of dangerous adventure and of recuperation. He proposed four explanations of how Tolkien might naturally have created this sort of material. Shippey suggested firstly that the text gives the impression not of a moment of inspiration followed by a period of careful invention, but of a lengthy period of laborious invention, in search of some kind of inspiration. Tolkien would write and invent characters, places, and events. He would then naturally run into the complications that inevitably arise when different story-elements collide. These then led at last to an inspiration.

Shippey comments that the work gave the impression that Tolkien, despite "much reworking", had been "initially groping for a story and keeping himself going with a sort of travelogue". In search of material, Tolkien indulged in "a sort of self-plagiarism", repurposing and expanding his own earlier inventions from, for instance, the poem "The Adventures of Tom Bombadil" which he had written in 1934. This gave him the characters Tom Bombadil, Old Man Willow, and the Barrow-wight. Tolkien's professional knowledge of philology, too, came to his aid, with careful concern for places and placenames, starting in the rather English Shire and then moving outside it. Finally, Tolkien allowed himself a measure of whimsical fun, describing the delicious meals the Hobbit protagonists were able to enjoy when each adventure was over, singing cheerful songs in the form of poems embedded in the text, taking hot baths in Crickhollow, and most pleasurably, constructing humorous dialogue. Shippey comments that "Tolkien found it too easy, and too amusing, just to let the Hobbits chatter on." Both Tolkien's friend C.S. Lewis and his publisher Rayner Unwin had to tell him to cut back the Hobbit-talk.

Tolkien's descriptions of Frodo's five "Homely Houses", alternating with places of danger, form a repetitive structure for the first part of the volume. "Homely Houses" are shown with house icons; dangers, with or without actual violence, with crossed-swords icons. Arrangement is diagrammatic.

==== Deliberately constructed ====
In 2001, in the London Review of Books, Jenny Turner wrote that The Lord of the Rings was suitable for "vulnerable people. You can feel secure inside [it], no matter what is going on in the nasty world outside. The merest weakling can be the master of this cosy little universe. Even a silly furry little hobbit can see his dreams come true." She cited Shippey's observation ("The hobbits ... have to be dug out ... of no fewer than five 'Homely Houses'") that the quest repeats itself, the chase in the Shire ending with dinner at Farmer Maggot's, the trouble with Old Man Willow ending with hot baths and comfort at Tom Bombadil's, and again safety after adventures in Bree and Rivendell. Turner commented that reading the book is to "find oneself gently rocked between bleakness and luxury, the sublime and the cosy. Scary, safe again. Scary, safe again. Scary, safe again."

Explanations of Frodo's five "Homely Houses"
Critic	Proposed explanation	Implied writing method
Jenny Turner	Deliberate storytelling for "vulnerable people"	"Scary, safe again. Scary, safe again."
Tom Shippey	Laborious inventions in search of inspiration	Invent characters, places, events. Run into complications: rewrite continually; find inspiration at last.
Tom Shippey	Use any materials you wrote earlier	Expand old poems, develop characters mentioned in them (Old Man Willow, Tom Bombadil, the Barrow-wight).
Tom Shippey	Concern for places and placenames	Develop placenames in the Shire and then elsewhere (e.g. Bree) using philology.
Tom Shippey	Whimsical fun	Describe meals in detail; have the characters sing songs, included in the text; let the hobbits "chatter on" and play exuberantly.

=== Cycles and spirals ===
In A Tolkien Compass, the scholar of literature David M. Miller describes The Lord of the Rings, like The Hobbit before it, as a "there and back again" tale "with various digressive adventures upon the way". In his view, the setting is thus the road, and the novel is to an extent picaresque, with the crucial distinction that the components are nearly always essential to the plot. The protagonist, Bilbo and then Frodo, experiences one adventure after another, "perhaps learning and maturing as he goes, but encountering each experience essentially afresh." Miller identifies nine such "cycles" in The Fellowship of the Ring.

Each "conference" involves food, so the cycles are of feast and famine. Each danger "is total", since defeat at any point would end the quest. The unexpected helper in each cycle is the advisor in the next cycle. Miller notes that the cycles involving Old Man Willow and the Barrow-wight are anomalous, as the stages do not get the Ring any closer to Rivendell, nor are the hostile characters at all concerned with the Ring. Instead, the "Old Forest, Old Man Willow, Tom as Eldest" (his emphasis) stand outside time, "left over from the First Age"; and like the quest, "time spurts and lags with discernible rhythm".

Shippey describes Miller's analysis as giving "a sense of cycles and spirals" rather than a feeling of linear progression. Shippey suggests that these structures might have been "created in part by Tolkien's work habits, rewriting continually", in many small stages like waves of an incoming tide, "each one rolling a little further up the beach."

=== Flashback chapters ===
Scholars have remarked that unlike the rest of The Lord of the Rings (which has an elaborately interlaced structure), all of The Fellowship of the Ring is told as a single thread with Frodo as the protagonist, with the exception of the two long flashback chapters, "The Shadow of the Past" and "The Council of Elrond". Those two chapters combine summaries of the history of the Ring, and quoted dialogue. Further, they are similar in having a character – Gandalf or Elrond – recapitulate the past so as to explain the present situation.

Narrative structure of The Fellowship of the Ring
Book	Single narrative thread with Frodo as protagonist	Flashback narrated by Gandalf or Elrond	Importance
The Ring Sets Out	"A Long-expected Party"		
		"The Shadow of the Past"	"the crucial chapter" (Tolkien); "the vital chapter" (Shippey); defines the work's central plot; Frodo and the reader realise there will be a quest to destroy the Ring
	10 more chapters		
The Ring Goes South	"Many Meetings"		
		"The Council of Elrond"	Exceptionally long at 15,000 words; explains danger of the Ring; introduces the Fellowship members; defines the quest (rest of novel)
	8 more chapters		

== Reception ==
=== Of the volume ===
The poet W. H. Auden wrote a positive review in The New York Times, praising the excitement and saying "Tolkien's invention is unflagging, and, on the primitive level of wanting to know what happens next, The Fellowship of the Ring is at least as good as The Thirty-Nine Steps." However, he said that the light humour in the beginning was "not Tolkien's forte". The scholar Loren Eiseley wrote in the New York Herald Tribune that Tolkien's was "a major creative act", constructing a "great tapestry ... rich with all manner of invention and of symbols, of the peculiar ethnology of a created world". This transcended the "primary or Baconian world" and would "outlive the artist". The literary critic Edmund Wilson however wrote an unflattering review entitled "Oo, Those Awful Orcs!", calling Tolkien's work "juvenile trash", and saying "Dr. Tolkien has little skill at narrative and no instinct for literary form."

The novelist H. A. Blair, writing in the Church Quarterly Review, stated that the work told "poetic truth", appealing to "unconscious archetypes", and that it was a pre-Christian but religious book, with Christian "echoes and emphasis". The Catholic reviewer Christopher Derrick wrote in The Tablet that the book was openly mythical, being a heroic romance. In his view, Tolkien displayed "amazing fertility in creating his world and almost succeeds in devising an elevated diction". Tolkien's friend and fellow-Inkling C. S. Lewis wrote in Time and Tide that the book created a new world of romance and "myth without allegorical pointing", with a powerful sense of history.

The science fiction writer L. Sprague de Camp, in Science Fiction Quarterly, called it "a big, leisurely, colorful, poetical, sorrowful, adventuresome romance", and characterised a Hobbit as "a cross between an English white-collar worker and a rabbit." The novelist Naomi Mitchison praised the work in The New Statesman and Nation, stating that "above all it is a story magnificently told, with every kind of colour and movement and greatness." The Scottish poet Edwin Muir wrote in The Observer that "however one may look at it The Fellowship of the Ring is an extraordinary book", but that although Tolkien "describes a tremendous conflict between good and evil ... his good people are consistently good, his evil figures immovably evil". He commented that if Tolkien had had the "sensibility or the style to express the particular degree of humanity which we find in Spenser and Ariosto and Malory", and his imagination "equal to his invention", "this book might have been a masterpiece".

=== Of "The Shadow of the Past" ===
Tolkien called the second chapter, "The Shadow of the Past", "the crucial chapter" of the entire novel; the Tolkien scholar Tom Shippey labelled it "the vital chapter". This is because it represents both the moment that Tolkien devised the central plot of the book, and the point in the story where the protagonist, Frodo Baggins, and the reader realise that there will be a quest to destroy the Ring. A sketch of it was among the first parts of the book to be written, early in 1938; later that year, it was one of three chapters of the book that he drafted. In 1944, he returned to the chapter, adding descriptions of Gollum, the Ring, and the hunt for Gollum. The chapter changes the book's tone from the first chapter's light-hearted Hobbit partying, and introduces major themes of the book. These include a sense of the depth of time behind unfolding events, the power of the Ring, and the inter-related questions of providence, free will, and predestination.

=== Of "The Council of Elrond" ===
"The Council of Elrond", the second chapter of Book 2, is the longest chapter in that book at some 15,000 words, and critical for explaining the power and threat of the Ring, for introducing the final members of the Fellowship of the Ring, and for defining the planned quest to destroy it. Contrary to the maxim "Show, don't tell", the chapter consists mainly of people talking; the action is, as in "The Shadow of the Past", narrated, largely by the Wizard Gandalf, in flashback. The chapter parallels the far simpler Beorn chapter in The Hobbit, which similarly presents a culture-clash of the modern (mediated by the Hobbit) with the ancient (the heroic Beorn). Shippey calls the chapter "a largely unappreciated tour de force". The Episcopal priest Fleming Rutledge writes that the chapter brings the hidden narrative of Christianity in The Lord of the Rings close to the surface.

== Sources ==
- Carpenter, Humphrey, ed. (2023) [1981]. The Letters of J. R. R. Tolkien: Revised and Expanded Edition. New York: HarperCollins. ISBN 978-0-35-865298-4.
- Hammond, Wayne G.; Scull, Christina (2005). The Lord of the Rings: A Reader's Companion. HarperCollins. pp. 74–91. ISBN 978-0-007-20907-1.
- Hammond, Wayne G.; Scull, Christina (2006a). The J.R.R. Tolkien Companion and Guide: Chronology. London: HarperCollins. ISBN 0-261-10381-4.
- Miller, David M. (1975). "Narrative Pattern in The Fellowship of the Ring". In Lobdell, Jared (ed.). A Tolkien Compass (First ed.). Open Court. pp. 95–106. ISBN 0-87548-303-8.
- Rutledge, Fleming (2004). The Battle for Middle-earth: Tolkien's Divine Design in The Lord of the Rings. William B. Eerdmans Publishing Company. ISBN 978-0-80282-497-4.
- Scott, Bud (2011). "Tolkien's use of free will versus predestination in The Lord of the Rings". Mallorn (51): 31–33.
- Shippey, Tom (2001). J. R. R. Tolkien: Author of the Century. HarperCollins. ISBN 978-0261-10401-3.
- Shippey, Tom (2005) [1982]. The Road to Middle-Earth: How J. R. R. Tolkien Created a New Mythology (Third ed.). HarperCollins. ISBN 978-0-261-10275-0.
- St. Clair, Gloriana (1995). "Tolkien as Reviser: A Case Study". Mallorn. 21 (2): 145–150.
