= J. R. R. Tolkien: Author of the Century =

Book by Tom Shippey

- First edition
- Author: Tom Shippey
- Language: English
- Subject: Biography, Literary criticism
- Publisher: HarperCollins
- Publication date: 2000
- Media type: Paperback and Hardcover
- Pages: 384
- ISBN: 978-0-618-12764-1

J. R. R. Tolkien: Author of the Century is a 2000 book of literary criticism written by Tom Shippey. It is about the work of the philologist and fantasy author J. R. R. Tolkien. In it, Shippey argues for the relevance of Tolkien today and attempts to firmly establish Tolkien's literary merits, based on analysis of The Hobbit, The Lord of the Rings, The Silmarillion, and Tolkien's shorter works.

The book was well received by scholars, who however pointed out that it covered similar ground to his 1983 book The Road to Middle-earth, for a more general audience. Reviews in both The Independent and The Observer praised the book, stating that it made a low-key but effective case for Tolkien's quality, and noting that it undercut the British literary establishment's hostility to Tolkien. The book won the 2001 World Fantasy Award and the 2001 Mythopoeic Award.

== Book ==
=== Synopsis ===
Shippey begins with a chapter-length "Foreword", introducing the fantasy genre, Tolkien's life, and the "Author of the Century" claim. He notes Tolkien's high ratings in the polls, and his effective creation of a new genre. The book examines in turn The Hobbit, The Lord of the Rings, The Silmarillion, and Tolkien's shorter works. (Note: Shippey 2001, pp. vii–xxxv)

On The Hobbit, Shippey tells how Tolkien came to start to write; its connection to his First World War experience; the possible origins of the word hobbit, and its parallels with "rabbit"; Bilbo's riddle-contest with Gollum; its links with Old English and Norse literature; and the Ring.

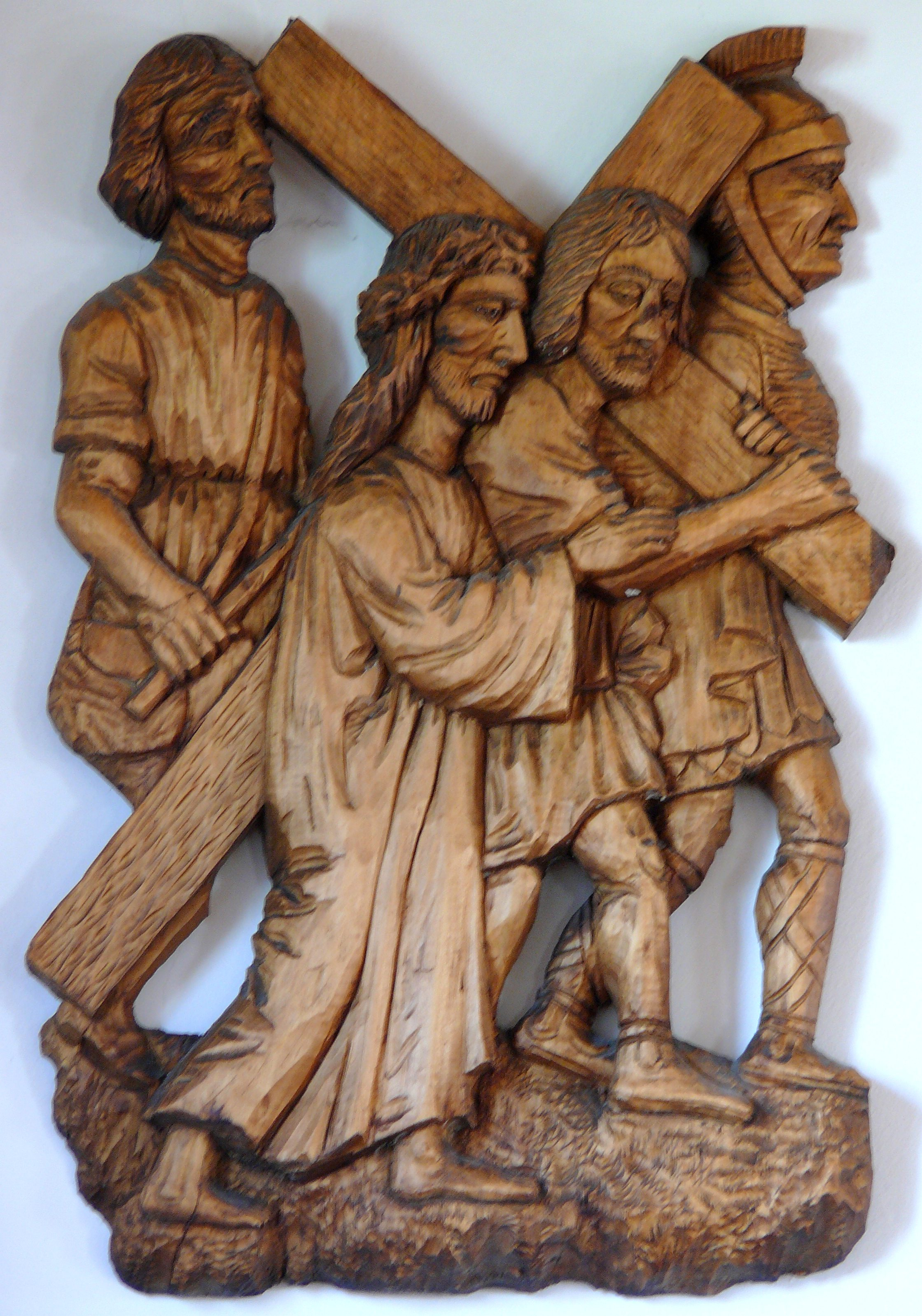
Shippey analyses the place of Christianity in The Lord of the Rings. (Note: Shippey 2001, pp. 112–160) Simon of Cyrene carrying the Cross, Church of St. John Nepomucen, Brenna

The Lord of the Rings is analysed in three central chapters. These show how subtly it is constructed, based especially on maps and languages, (Note: Shippey 2001, pp. 50–111) and the conception of evil that it embodies, a tension between the Boethian view (the absence of good) and the Manichean (a powerful force opposing good). Finally it examines the question of allegory (something Tolkien denied) versus applicability, and the mythic dimension of the work, with its deep - not instantly obvious - connection to Christianity, indeed to Roman Catholicism, to ancient myth, and to modern life, most evident in the chapter The Scouring of the Shire. (Note: Shippey 2001, pp. 161–225)

The chapter on The Silmarillion is subtitled "the work of his heart". Shippey explains the book's long gestation from Tolkien's 'Story of Kullervo' in 1913. He describes Tolkien's purpose and approach in seeking to create a mythology for England. (Note: Shippey 2001, pp. 226–263)

On the shorter works, Shippey concedes that many would have been forgotten, but for the popularity of his Middle-earth books. The works include both prose and poetry; he considers Leaf by Niggle and Smith of Wootton Major to be autobiographical allegories, full of allusions to Tolkien's own life. (Note: Shippey 2001, pp. 264–304)

The book concludes with an "Afterword" (a whole chapter) repudiating the "intense critical hostility" by the literary establishment in the 20th century. Shippey notes that no "modern writer of fantasy has managed to escape the mark of Tolkien". (Note: Shippey 2001, pp. 305–328)

=== Publication history ===
The book was first published in hardback in 2000 by HarperCollins in London and Houghton Mifflin in Boston. Both publishers brought out paperback editions in 2001. A Spanish edition was published by Minotauro in Barcelona in 2003. A Polish edition was produced by Zysk i S-ka Wydawnictwo in Poznań in 2004, and a French edition was published by Bragelonne in Paris in 2016.

== Reception ==
=== Scholarly ===
The scholars Michael Drout and Hilary Wynne, in a review in Envoi of Tolkien criticism from 1982 to 2000, write that too much of it has repeatedly covered the same ground, while remaining unaware of earlier research. They name Shippey and Author of the Century as "the single best thing ever written on Tolkien", and state that he could reasonably see himself as above other critics, but did not. They note that the similarity of his background to Tolkien's gave him "an enormous advantage", and that while he was sometimes polemical, he always remained reasonable and measured, and never "bash[ed] Tolkien fandom" or talked down to readers.

The scholar of literature Charles W. Nelson, reviewing the work in Extrapolation, writes that Shippey asserts that Tolkien was "first and foremost a linguist, then a mythologist, and finally a writer of fantasy", and that he supports this by citing multiple examples of Tolkien's language- and myth-based creation from both The Hobbit and The Lord of the Rings.

The historian Bradley J. Birzer, reviewing the book in Catholic Social Science Review, writes that the "British literati" were dismissive of Tolkien, and that reviewers like Andrew Rissik seemed to have "reeled back in shock" in a "knee-jerk" reaction to Shippey's book. Birzer states that Shippey is an expert in medieval literature, and that his view of Tolkien "carries considerable weight". He describes the book as containing similar information as Shippey's scholarly 1983 book The Road to Middle-Earth, but aimed at a well-educated general audience.

The scholar Valerie Estelle Frankel, reviewing a festschrift collection of essays in honour of Shippey, wrote that his books The Road to Middle-earth and Author of the Century lay "at the top of Tolkien scholars' favorite works".

The Tolkien scholar David Bratman wrote in Mythprint that while the book covers much of the same ground as The Road to Middle-Earth, the text has been "semi-rewritten and semi-expanded", making some new points. He finds Shippey at his most brilliant and entertaining when discussing the Ring's evil and its addictive nature.

=== Popular ===
Martin Morse Wooster, for The American Enterprise, wrote that "Shippey is a crisp, forceful, and intelligent writer who has produced a highly readable appreciation of Tolkien's life and art." The Tolkien scholar Patrick Curry, in The Independent, wrote that Shippey succeeds brilliantly in rebutting Tolkien's critics and demonstrating that Tolkien's Middle-earth writings are "based on deep learning and a set of values that represent challenge to [the literati's] authority". The author and medieval scholar Charles Moseley, in The Observer, wrote that Shippey's choice of title is a "sly echo" of the author and public intellectual Germaine Greer's critical remark that "It has been my nightmare that Tolkien would turn out to be the most influential writer of the century". He called the book witty and combative, but also illuminating "especially on The Silmarillion". Publishers Weekly called the book "a wonderfully readable study aimed at not just the Tolkien fan but any literate person curious about this fantasy author's extraordinary popularity". It described the work as building an "impressive, low-key case" for Tolkien's merit, and called the account "as learned as it is free of academic jargon".

The book won the 2001 World Fantasy Award and the 2001 Mythopoeic Award, and was nominated for the 2002 Hugo Award, the 2001 Locus Award.

== See also ==
- The Road to Middle-earth, an earlier book by Shippey about Tolkien, revised and extended in later editions

== Sources ==
- Shippey, Tom (2001). J. R. R. Tolkien: Author of the Century. HarperCollins. ISBN 978-0261-10401-3.
