= Literary reception of The Lord of the Rings =

Literary reception of J. R. R. Tolkien's Lord of the Rings

J. R. R. Tolkien's bestselling fantasy novel The Lord of the Rings had an initial mixed literary reception. Despite some enthusiastic early reviews from supporters such as W. H. Auden, Iris Murdoch, and C. S. Lewis, scholars noted a measure of literary hostility to Tolkien, which continued until the start of the 21st century. From 1982, Tolkien scholars such as Tom Shippey and Verlyn Flieger began to roll back the hostility, defending Tolkien, rebutting the critics' attacks and analysing what they saw as good qualities in Tolkien's writing.

From 2003, scholars such as Brian Rosebury began to consider why Tolkien had attracted such hostility. Rosebury stated that Tolkien avoided calling The Lord of the Rings a novel, and that in Shippey's view Tolkien had been aiming to create a medieval-style heroic romance, despite modern scepticism about that literary mode. In 2014, Patrick Curry analysed the reasons for the hostility, finding it both visceral and full of evident mistakes, and suggesting that the issue was that the critics felt that Tolkien threatened their dominant ideology, modernism.

Interpretations of The Lord of the Rings have included Marxist criticism, sometimes at odds with Tolkien's social conservatism; the psychological reading of heroes, their partners, and their opponents as Jungian archetypes; and comparison of Tolkien with modernist writers.

== Context ==
J. R. R. Tolkien (1892–1973) was an English Roman Catholic writer, poet, philologist, and academic, best known as the author of the high fantasy works The Hobbit and The Lord of the Rings.

In 1954–55, The Lord of the Rings was published. In 1957, it was awarded the International Fantasy Award. The publication of the Ace Books and Ballantine paperbacks in the United States helped it to become immensely popular with a new generation in the 1960s. The book has remained so ever since, ranking as one of the most popular works of fiction of the twentieth century, judged by both sales and reader surveys. In the 2003 "Big Read" survey conducted by the BBC, The Lord of the Rings was found to be the "Nation's best-loved book." In similar 2004 polls both Germany and Australia also found The Lord of the Rings to be their favourite book. In a 1999 poll of Amazon.com customers, The Lord of the Rings was judged to be their favourite "book of the millennium." The popularity of The Lord of the Rings increased further when Peter Jackson's film trilogy came out in 2001–2003.

== Tolkien's own commentary ==
Daniel Timmons writes that Tolkien launched a thread of commentary of his own on The Lord of the Rings with his own remarks, both in his two forewords (in the first and second editions) to the novel, and in his letters and essays. In the first foreword, having stated that "This tale ... is drawn ... from the memoirs of the renowned Hobbits, Bilbo and Frodo, as they are preserved in the Red Book of Westmarch" (i.e. the book is a translation), he comments that the book is "not yet universally recognized as an important branch of study". This could be a whimsical allusion to the lack of analysis of the novel by historians, but Timmons states that there is "no clear hint of irony or whimsy". Instead, Timmons writes, it could be "wryly indicating" that reception by critics might turn out to be hostile. Whatever the case, he comments, Tolkien hovers between writing as author and as a fictionalised narrator. Further, Timmons states, Tolkien's other writings either reflect changes in his opinions over time, or border on the "disingenuous" to make an immediate point. For instance, Tolkien states firmly in Letter 26 (1937) that "Celtic" things are "mad" and that the names and tales in The Silmarillion are not Celtic, when it was well known that he loved the Welsh language, and indeed mentioned "the fair elusive beauty that some call Celtic" in Letter 144 (1954). Timmons concludes that Tolkien could "[play] up to his audience" with a variety of "rhetorical techniques" when commenting on his own work.

The second edition foreword has been taken seriously by critics, but it too, Timmons writes, must be treated carefully. He notes that Tolkien's letters show that he began to write The Lord of the Rings in December 1937, three months after The Hobbit was published, shortly after several letters to and from his publisher. The foreword however claims that The Lord of the Rings was started before The Hobbit appeared. Further inaccuracies about dates and other details follow; Timmons remarks that these throw into question his denial of the Second World War's influence on his book, and any intention to create an allegory. Tolkien admits that "a story-germ uses the soil of experience" but decries scholarly attempts to explore that process as "at best guesses from evidence that is inadequate and ambiguous". All the same, Timmons writes, Tolkien made exactly that kind of best guess in his own analyses of Beowulf, Maldon, and Sir Gawain. Tolkien is equally dismissive of the search for parallels in his own life with anything in the story, leading him into further contradictions in his 1966 piece in Diplomat, "Tolkien on Tolkien". He objects, too, to the accusations that the book contains "no religion" and "no women", and to the suggestion that Middle-earth has nothing to do with planet Earth. Timmons concludes that Tolkien seems to view "any piece of criticism as an unwelcome treatment of his work", and that critics need to remain objective, judging Tolkien's claims against his books, rather than assuming that his claims are necessarily true.

== Enthusiastic early support ==
Early reviews of The Lord of the Rings were sharply divided between enthusiastic support and outright rejection. Some literary figures immediately welcomed the book's publication. The poet W. H. Auden, a former pupil of Tolkien's and an admirer of his writings, regarded The Lord of the Rings as a "masterpiece", further stating that in some cases it outdid the achievement of John Milton's 1667–1674 Paradise Lost. Kenneth F. Slater wrote in Nebula Science Fiction, April 1955, "... if you don't read it, you have missed one of the finest books of its type ever to appear". Michael Straight described it in The New Republic as "... one of the few works of genius in modern literature." The novelist Iris Murdoch mentioned Middle-earth characters in her novels, and wrote to Tolkien saying she had been "utterly ... delighted, carried away, absorbed by The Lord of the Rings ... I wish I could say it in the fair Elven tongue." The poet and novelist Richard Hughes wrote that nothing like it had been attempted in English literature since Edmund Spenser's 1590–1596 Faerie Queene, making it hard to compare, but that "For width of imagination it almost beggars parallel, and it is nearly as remarkable for its vividness and the narrative skill which carries the reader on, enthralled, for page after page." In 1967, the scholar of literature George H. Thomson admired Tolkien's ability to bring many aspects of a chivalric romance, complete with complex interlacing of the narrative, into a modern work. The Scottish novelist Naomi Mitchison, too, was a strong and long-time supporter, corresponding with Tolkien about Lord of the Rings both before and after publication. Tolkien's friend and fellow member of the literary group The Inklings, C. S. Lewis, wrote "here are beauties which pierce like swords or burn like cold iron." The fantasy and science fiction author Ursula K. Le Guin had a close relationship with Tolkien's writings, and reflected on issues such as whether fantasy is escapist, the subtlety of the character portraits in The Lord of the Rings, its narrative structure, and its handling of the nature of evil in her 1979 essay collection The Language of the Night.

== Literary hostility ==
=== 20th century ===
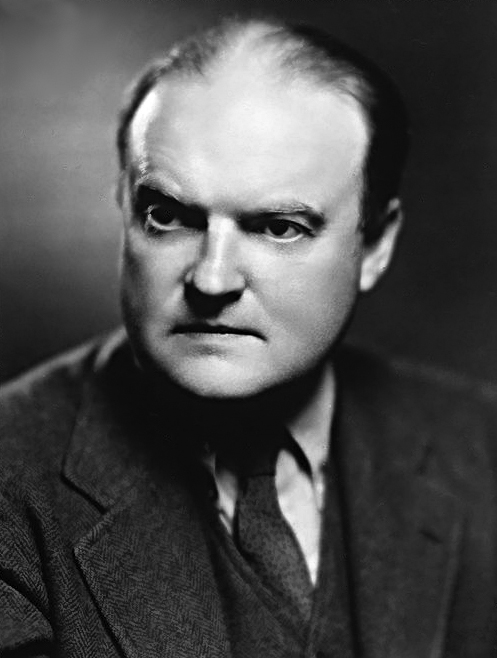
The critic Edmund Wilson attacked Tolkien's work in 1955.

Some literary figures rejected Tolkien and The Lord of the Rings outright. One member of the Inklings, Hugo Dyson, complained loudly at readings of the book; Christopher Tolkien records Dyson as "lying on the couch, and lolling and shouting and saying, 'Oh God, no more Elves.'"

In 1956, the literary critic Edmund Wilson wrote a review entitled "Oo, Those Awful Orcs!", calling Tolkien's work "juvenile trash", and saying "Dr. Tolkien has little skill at narrative and no instinct for literary form."

It was however not the case that early reviews were overwhelmingly negative. An early reply to Wilson was the classicist Douglass Parker's 1957 review "Hwaet We Holbytla ..." (Note: "How much We of Hobbits [have heard]...", an echo of "Hwaet We Gardena...", the first words of Beowulf.) which stood up for The Lord of the Rings as a worldbuilding fantasy. Parker wrote that the "one serious attack" on the novel was "a rather nasty hatchet-job", which "appears to have resulted from Wilson's ineluctable conviction that all fantasy is trash, The Lord of the Rings is fantasy, ergo [the book was trash.]" Parker argued that the book was in fact "probably the most original and varied creation ever seen in the genre, and certainly the most self-consistent; yet it is tied up with and bridged to reality as is no other fantasy." He noted that the book is far from a "piddling" good-defeats-evil allegory, not least because the characters on the good side "are not abstractions, nor are they wholly good, nor are they [all] alike".

In 1954, the Scottish poet Edwin Muir wrote in The Observer that "however one may look at it, The Fellowship of the Ring is an extraordinary book", but that although Tolkien "describes a tremendous conflict between good and evil ... his good people are consistently good, his evil figures immovably evil". In 1955, Muir attacked The Return of the King, writing that "All the characters are boys masquerading as adult heroes ... and will never come to puberty ... Hardly one of them knows anything about women", causing Tolkien to complain angrily to his publisher.

In 1969, the feminist scholar Catherine R. Stimpson published a book-length attack on Tolkien, describing him as "an incorrigible nationalist", peopling his writing with "irritatingly, blandly, traditionally masculine" one-dimensional characters who live out a "bourgeois pastoral idyll". This set the tone for other hostile critics. Hal Colebatch and Patrick Curry have rebutted these charges.

Criticisms of Tolkien by Catherine R. Stimpson, rebutted by Patrick Curry
Stimpson's charges	Curry's rebuttals
"An incorrigible nationalist", his epic "celebrates the English bourgeois pastoral idyll. Its characters, tranquil and well fed, live best in placid, philistine, provincial rural cosiness."	"Hobbits would have liked to live quiet rural lives – if they could have". Bilbo, Frodo, Sam, Merry and Pippin chose not to do so.
Tolkien's characters are one-dimensional, dividing neatly into "good & evil, nice & nasty"	Frodo, Gollum, Boromir, and Denethor have "inner struggles, with widely varying results". Several major characters have a shadow; Frodo has both Sam and Gollum, and Gollum is in Sam's words both "Stinker" and "Slinker". Each race (Men, Elves, Hobbits) "is a collection of good, bad, and indifferent individuals".
Tolkien's language betrays "class snobbery".	In The Hobbit, maybe, but not in The Lord of the Rings. Even Orcs are of three kinds, "and none are necessarily 'working-class'". Hobbits are of varied class, and the idioms of each reflect that, as with contemporary humans. Sam, "arguably the real hero", has the accent and idiom of a rural peasant; the "major villains – Smaug, Saruman, the Lord of the Nazgûl (and presumably Sauron too) are unmistakably posh". "The Scouring of the Shire" is certainly (in Tolkien's words) "the hour of the [ordinary] Shire-folk".
"Behind the moral structure is a regressive emotional pattern. For Tolkien is irritatingly, blandly, traditionally masculine....He makes his women characters, no matter what their rank, the most hackneyed of stereotypes. They are either beautiful and distant, simply distant, or simply simple".	"It is tempting to reply, guilty as charged", as Tolkien is paternalistic, but Galadriel is "a powerful and wise woman" and like Éowyn is "more complex and conflicted than Stimpson allows". Tolkien "committed no crime worse than being a man of his time and place". And "countless women have enjoyed and even loved The Lord of the Rings". Scholars have objected that the novel says little on women and sexuality, but they do not complain that Moby Dick says little on that subject.

The fantasy author Michael Moorcock, in his 1978 essay, "Epic Pooh", compared Tolkien's work to Winnie-the-Pooh. He asserted, citing the third chapter of The Lord of the Rings, that its "predominant tone" was "the prose of the nursery-room ... a lullaby; it is meant to soothe and console."

=== 21st century ===
A measure of hostility continued until the start of the 21st century. In 2001, The New York Times reviewer Judith Shulevitz criticized the "pedantry" of Tolkien's literary style, saying that he "formulated a high-minded belief in the importance of his mission as a literary preservationist, which turns out to be death to literature itself." The same year, in the London Review of Books, Jenny Turner wrote that The Lord of the Rings provided "a closed space, finite and self-supporting, fixated on its own nostalgia, quietly running down"; the books were suitable for "vulnerable people. You can feel secure inside them, no matter what is going on in the nasty world outside. The merest weakling can be the master of this cosy little universe. Even a silly furry little hobbit can see his dreams come true." She cited the Tolkien scholar Tom Shippey's observation ("The hobbits ... have to be dug out ... of no fewer than five Homely Houses") that the quest repeats itself, the chase in the Shire ending with dinner at Farmer Maggot's, the trouble with Old Man Willow ending with hot baths and comfort at Tom Bombadil's, and again safety after adventures in Bree, Rivendell, and Lothlórien. Turner commented that reading the book is to "find oneself gently rocked between bleakness and luxury, the sublime and the cosy. Scary, safe again. Scary, safe again. Scary, safe again." In her view, this compulsive rhythm is what Sigmund Freud described in his Beyond the Pleasure Principle. She asked whether, in his writing, Tolkien, whose father died when he was 3 and his mother when he was 12, was not "trying to recover his lost parents, his lost childhood, an impossibly prelapsarian sense of peace?"

The critic Richard Jenkyns, writing in The New Republic in 2002, criticized a perceived lack of psychological depth. Both the characters and the work itself were, according to Jenkyns, "anemic, and lacking in fiber." Also that year, the science-fiction author David Brin criticised the book in Salon as carefully crafted and seductive, but backward-looking. He wrote that he had enjoyed it as a child as escapist fantasy, but that it clearly also reflected the decades of totalitarianism in the mid-20th century. Brin saw the change from feudalism to a free middle class as progress, and in his view, Tolkien, like the Romantic poets, as opposed to that. As well as its being "a great tale", Brin saw good points in the work; Tolkien was, he wrote, self-critical, for example blaming the elves for trying to halt time by forging their Rings, while the Ringwraiths could be seen as cautionary figures of Greek hubris, men who reached too high, and fell.

The historian Jared Lobdell, evaluating the hostile reception of Tolkien by the mainstream literary establishment in the 2006 J. R. R. Tolkien Encyclopedia, noted that Wilson was "well known as an enemy of religion", of popular books, and "conservatism in any form". Lobdell concluded that "no 'mainstream critic' appreciated The Lord of the Rings or indeed was in a position to write criticism on it – most being unsure what it was and why readers liked it." He noted that Brian Aldiss was a critic of science fiction, distinguishing such "critics" from Tolkien scholarship, the study and analysis of Tolkien's themes, influences, and methods.

== Rehabilitation ==
=== Tolkien studies ===
Diagram of Patrick Grant's Jungian View of The Lord of the Rings with hero, anima and other archetypes

Tolkien's fiction began to acquire respectability in academia only at the end of his life, with the publication of Paul H. Kocher's 1972 Master of Middle-Earth. Written before the publication of The Silmarillion, Kocher inferred or guessed many of the key points about Tolkien's writings, later confirmed by Christopher Tolkien's research.

In 1973, Patrick Grant, a scholar of Renaissance literature, offered a psychological interpretation of The Lord of the Rings, identifying similarities between the interactions of the characters and Jungian archetypes. He states that the Hero appears both in noble and powerful form as Aragorn, and in childlike form as Frodo, whose quest can be interpreted as a personal journey of individuation. They are opposed by the Ringwraiths. Frodo's anima is the Elf-queen Galadriel, who is opposed by the evil giant female spider Shelob. The Old Wise Man archetype is filled by the wizard Gandalf, who is opposed by the corrupted wizard Saruman. Frodo's Shadow Gollum is, appropriately in Grant's view, also a male Hobbit, like Frodo. Aragorn has an Ideal Partner in Arwen, but also a Negative Animus in Eowyn, at least until she meets Faramir and chooses a happy union with him instead.

Richard C. West compiled an annotated checklist of Tolkien criticism in 1981. Serious study began to reach the broader community with Shippey's 1982 The Road to Middle-earth and Verlyn Flieger's Splintered Light in 1983. To borrow a phrase from Flieger, academia had trouble "taking seriously a subject which had, until he wrote, been dismissed as unworthy of attention."

Tolkien's works have since become the subject of a substantial body of academic research, both as fantasy fiction and as an extended exercise in invented languages. In 1998, Daniel Timmons wrote in a dedicated issue of the Journal of the Fantastic in the Arts that scholars still disagreed about Tolkien's place in literature, but that those critical of it were a minority. He noted that Shippey had said that the "literary establishment" did not include Tolkien among the canon of academic texts, whereas Jane Chance "boldly declares that at last Tolkien 'is being studied as important in himself, as one of the world's greatest writers'".

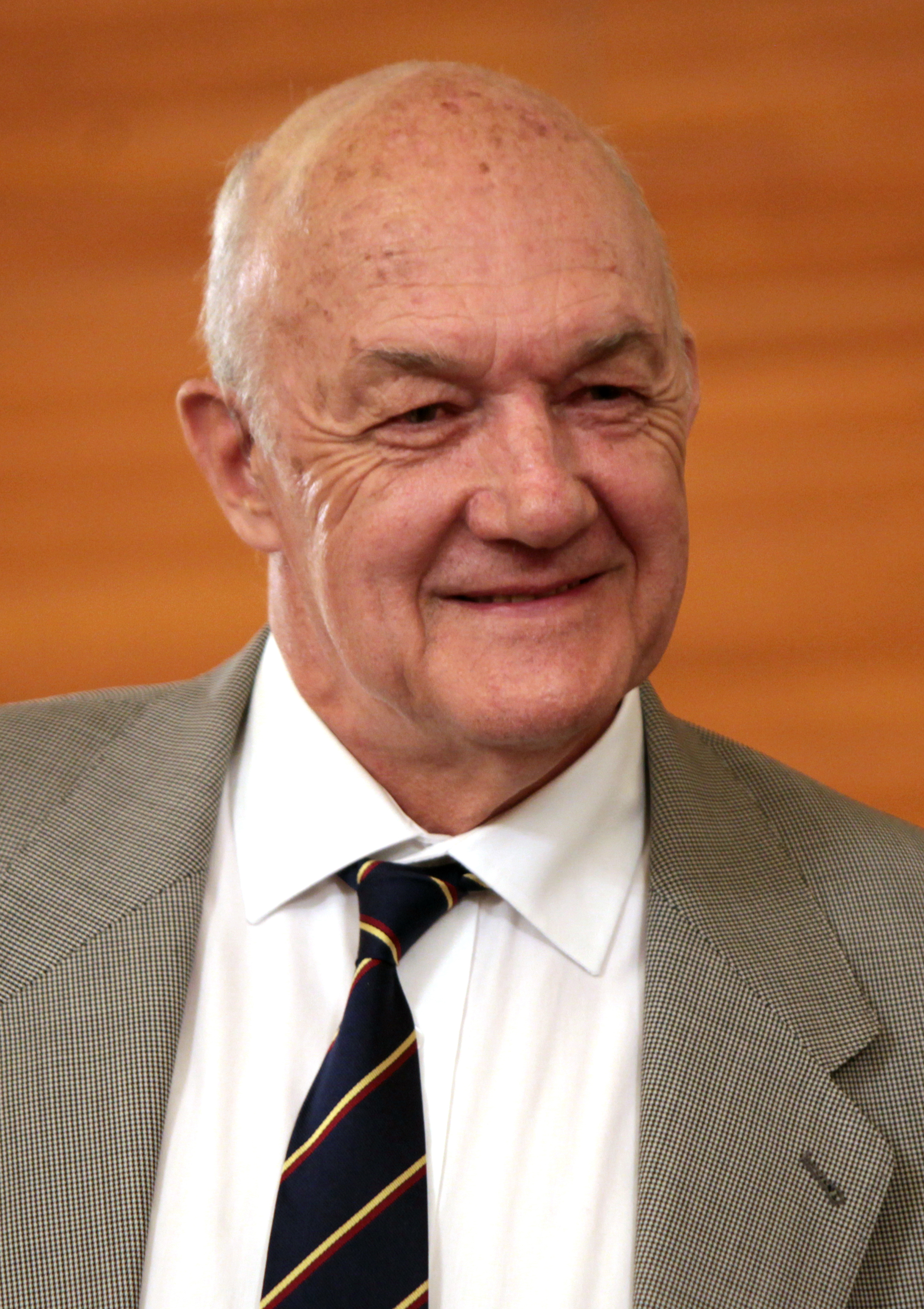
Tom Shippey, like Tolkien an English philologist, helped to pioneer the serious study of Tolkien's Middle-earth writings with his 1982 book The Road to Middle-earth.

Alongside their analysis of Tolkien's work, scholars set about rebutting many of the literary critics' claims. Starting with his 1982 book The Road to Middle-earth, Shippey pointed out that Muir's assertion that Tolkien's writing was non-adult, as the protagonists end with no pain, is not true of Frodo, who is permanently scarred and can no longer enjoy life in the Shire. Or again, he replies to Colin Manlove's attack on Tolkien's "overworked cadences" and "monotonous pitch" and the suggestion that the Ubi sunt section of the Old English poem The Wanderer is "real elegy" unlike anything in Tolkien, with the observation that Tolkien's Lament of the Rohirrim is a paraphrase of just that section; other scholars have praised Tolkien's poem. As a final example, he replies to the critic Mark Roberts's 1956 statement that The Lord of the Rings "is not moulded by some vision of things which is at the same time its raison d'etre"; he calls this one of the least perceptive comments ever made on Tolkien, stating that on the contrary the work "fits together ... on almost every level", with complex interlacing, a consistent ambiguity about the Ring and the nature of evil, and a consistent theory of the role of "chance" or "luck", all of which he explains in detail.

The pace of scholarly publications on Tolkien increased dramatically in the early 2000s. The dedicated journal Tolkien Studies was founded in 2004; that same year, the scholar Neil D. Isaacs introduced an anthology of Tolkien criticism with the words "This collection assumes that argument about the value and power of The Lord of the Rings has been settled, certainly to the satisfaction of its vast, growing, persistent audience, but also of a considerable body of critical judgment". The open-access Journal of Tolkien Research began publication in 2014. Pressure to study Tolkien seriously came initially from fans rather than academics; the scholarly legitimacy of the field was still a subject of debate in 2015.

Tolkien was strongly opposed to both Nazism and Communism; Hal Colebatch in the J. R. R. Tolkien Encyclopedia states that his views can be seen in what he considers to be the somewhat parodic "The Scouring of the Shire". Leftist critics have accordingly attacked Tolkien's social conservatism. E. P. Thompson blames the cold warrior mentality on "too much early reading of The Lord of the Rings". Other Marxist critics, however, have been more positive towards Tolkien. While criticizing the politics embedded in The Lord of the Rings, China Miéville admires Tolkien's creative use of Norse mythology, tragedy, monsters, and subcreation, as well as his criticism of allegory.

=== Literary re-evaluation ===
With the understanding that Tolkien was worth studying, scholars, authors, and critics began to re-evaluate his Middle-earth writings as literature. The humanities scholar Brian Rosebury stated in 2003 that The Lord of the Rings is both a quest – a story with a goal, to destroy the Ring – and a journey, an expansive tour of Middle-earth through a series of tableaux that filled readers with delight; and the two supported each other. Rosebury considered why The Lord of the Rings has attracted so much literary hostility, and re-evaluated it as a literary work. He noted that many critics have stated that it is not a novel and that some have proposed a medieval genre like "romance" or "epic". He cited Shippey's "more subtl[e]" suggestion that "Tolkien set himself to write a romance for an audience brought up on novels", noting that Tolkien did occasionally call the work a romance but usually called it a tale, a story, or a history. Shippey argued that the work aims at Northrop Frye's "heroic romance" mode, only one level below "myth", but descending to "low mimesis" with the much less serious hobbits, who serve to deflect the modern reader's scepticism of the higher reaches of medieval-style romance.

Diagram of Brian Rosebury's analysis of The Lord of the Rings as a combined quest (to destroy the Ring) and journey (as a series of Tableaux of places in Middle-earth); the two support each other, and must interlock tightly to do so.

Rosebury noted that much of the work, especially Book 1, is largely descriptive rather than plot-based; it focuses mainly on Middle-earth itself, taking a journey through a series of tableaux – in the Shire, in the Old Forest, with Tom Bombadil, and so on. He states that "The circumstantial expansiveness of Middle-earth itself is central to the work's aesthetic power". Alongside this slow descriptiveness is the quest to destroy the Ring, a unifying plotline. The Ring needs to be destroyed to save Middle-earth itself from destruction or domination by Sauron. Hence, Rosebury argued, the book does have a single focus: Middle-earth itself. The work builds up Middle-earth as a place that readers come to love, shows that it is under dire threat, and – with the destruction of the Ring – provides the "eucatastrophe" for a happy ending. That makes the work "comedic" rather than "tragic", in classical terms; but it also embodies the inevitability of loss, like the elves, hobbits, and the rest decline and fade. Even the least novelistic parts of the work, the chronicles, narratives, and essays of the appendices, help to build a consistent image of Middle-earth. The work is thus, Rosebury asserted, very tightly constructed, the expansiveness and plot fitting together exactly.

In Mallorn in 2004, the Tolkien scholar Caroline Galwey wrote the ironically-titled "Reasons for 'not' Liking Tolkien", inverting Turner's "Reasons for Liking Tolkien" and attacking her position, along with Edwin Muir's. In her view, "we cannot understand Tolkien-haters properly unless we go beyond their arguments to the things they do not say." Those things, she argues, include the "greatest strength" of The Lord of the Rings, that "in sensibility it is a (capital-R) Romantic work". In her view, Turner is "apparently so embarrassed by [Tolkien's Romanticism] that she won't even name it or admit that it has a pedigree." Galway writes, too, that Tolkien-haters have an "existential fear" of Tolkien's happiness: they cannot accept that "Joy, wonder, reverence, the Sublime" do mean something, that they stand alongside the world's suffering and evil, "undiminished by them, as a fact in this world."

In 2013, the fantasy author and humorist Terry Pratchett used a mountain theme to praise Tolkien, likening Tolkien to Mount Fuji, and writing that any other fantasy author "either has made a deliberate decision against the mountain, which is interesting in itself, or is in fact standing on [it]." In 2016, the British literary critic and poet Roz Kaveney reviewed five books about Tolkien in The Times Literary Supplement. She recorded that in 1991 she had said of The Lord of the Rings that it was worth "intelligent reading but not passionate attention", and accepted that she had "underestimated the extent to which it would gain added popularity and cultural lustre from Peter Jackson's film adaptations". As Pratchett had done, she used a mountain metaphor, alluding to Basil Bunting's poem about Ezra Pound's Cantos, with the words "Tolkien's books have become Alps and we will wait in vain for them to crumble." Kaveney called Tolkien's works "Thick Texts", books that are best read with some knowledge of his Middle-earth framework rather than as "single artworks". She accepted that he was a complicated figure, a scholar, a war survivor, a skilful writer of "light verse", a literary theorist, and a member of "a coterie of other influential thinkers". Further, she stated that he had much in common with modernist writers like T. S. Eliot. She suggested that The Lord of the Rings is "a good, intelligent, influential and popular book", but perhaps not, as some of his "idolators" would have it, "a transcendent literary masterpiece".

Andrew Higgins, reviewing the 2014 volume A Companion to J. R. R. Tolkien, welcomed the "eminent line-up" of the authors of its 36 articles (naming in particular Shippey, Verlyn Flieger, Dimitra Fimi, John D. Rateliff and Gergely Nagy). He called it "joyous indeed that after many years of polite (and not so polite) disdain and dismissal by establishment 'academics' and the 'cultural intelligentsia'" that Tolkien had reached the "academic pantheon" of Blackwell Companions. Higgins applauded the volume's editor, Stuart D. Lee, for "the overall thematic structuring of this volume, which offers a progressive profile of Tolkien the man, the student, and scholar, and the mythopoeist". Curry, writing in the Companion, stated that attempts at a balanced response, finding a positive critic for each negative one, as Daniel Timmons had done, was "admirably irenic [peaceful] but misleading" as this failed to address the reasons for the hostility. Curry noted that the attacks on Tolkien began when The Lord of the Rings appeared; increased when the work became "spectacular[ly] successful" from 1965; and revived when readers' polls by Waterstones and BBC Radio 4 acclaimed the work in 1996–1998, and then again when Peter Jackson's film trilogy came out in 2001–2003. He cited Shippey's remark that the hostile critics Philip Toynbee and Edmund Wilson revealed "gross inconsistency between their self-professed critical ideals and their practice when they encounter Tolkien", adding that Fred Inglis had called Tolkien a fascist and a practitioner of "'country-based fantasy' that is 'suburban' and 'half-educated". Curry states that these criticisms are not simply demonstrably mistaken, but "rather how very (his emphasis) mistaken they are, and how consistently. That suggests that there is (as Marxists like to say) a structural or systematic bias at work". He noted that Shippey's 1982 The Road to Middle-earth and then Verlyn Flieger's 1983 Splintered Light had slowly begun to reduce the hostility. That did not prevent Jenny Turner from repeating "some of her predecessors' elementary mistakes"; Curry wrote that she seemed to fail to grasp "two of the most important things about art, literary or otherwise: that reality is (also) ineluctably fictional, and that fiction and its referents are (also) unavoidably real", pointing out that metaphor is unavoidable in language.

Summing up the history of attacks, Curry identified two consistent features: "a visceral hostility and emotional animus, and a plethora of mistakes showing that the books had not been read closely". In his view, these derived from the critics' feeling that Tolkien threatened their "dominant ideology", modernism. Tolkien is, he wrote, modern but not modernist, at least as well-educated as the critics (another thing that made them feel threatened), and not ironic (especially about his writing). The Lord of the Rings is equally "a story told by a master story-teller; a story inspired by philology; a story suffused with Catholic values; and a mythic (or mythopoeic) story with a North European pagan inflection". In other words, Tolkien was about as anti-modernist as possible. Curry concluded by noting that newer authors including China Miéville, Junot Diaz, and Michael Chabon, and the critics Anthony Lane in The New Yorker and Andrew O'Hehir in Salon were taking a more open attitude, and cited the work's first publisher, Rayner Unwin's "pithy and accurate" assessment of it: "a very great book in its own curious way".

== See also ==
- Translating The Lord of the Rings

== Sources ==
- Carpenter, Humphrey, ed. (2023) [1981]. The Letters of J. R. R. Tolkien: Revised and Expanded Edition. New York: HarperCollins. ISBN 978-0-35-865298-4.
- Timmons, Daniel (1998a). Mirror on Middle-earth: J.R.R. Tolkien and the Critical Perspectives (PDF). University of Toronto (PhD thesis). ISBN 0-612-35342-7.
