= Patrick Curry =

British scholar (born 1951)

- Born: 1951 (age 74–75); Winnipeg, Canada
- Education: University of California, Santa Cruz (BA); London School of Economics (MSc); University College London (PhD)
- Occupations: Scholar; author
- Notable work: Defending Middle-earth
- Children: 2

Patrick Curry (born 1951) is a British scholar who has worked and taught on a variety of subjects from cultural astronomy to divination, the ecology movement, and the nature of enchantment. His studies include those on J. R. R. Tolkien.

Tolkien scholars such as Tom Shippey have endorsed many of Curry's views of Tolkien's work, but have found it inappropriate that he combines scholarly analysis with polemic or political advocacy. Tom Shippey agrees with Curry that critical responses to Tolkien have too often been hostile, and that enchantment differs from magic; he suggests that Tolkien would endorse Curry as the critic "closest to the secret of enchantment".

== Life ==
Patrick Curry was born in Winnipeg, Canada. He took his B.A. in psychology at the University of California, Santa Cruz in 1978. He gained his M.Sc. in logic and scientific method at the London School of Economics in 1980, and his Ph.D. in history and philosophy of science at University College London in 1987.

He lectured on cultural astronomy and on astronomy at Bath Spa University from 2002, and on cosmology and divination at the University of Kent at Canterbury from 2006. He is the editor-in-chief of The Ecological Citizen. He writes book reviews for British national newspapers, essays, and non-fiction books. He appeared in interviews on two of the extended DVDs on Peter Jackson's film trilogy of J. R. R. Tolkien's The Lord of the Rings. He is a contributor to Blackwell's 2014 A Companion to J. R. R. Tolkien. He has written two books of poetry, Lockdown and Desire Lines.

Curry is divorced and has two children. He states that he has had "a long relationship with Buddhism (Sōtō Zen)", taught by Kōbun Chino Otogawa.

== Reception ==
=== Defending Middle-Earth ===
Juliette Wood, reviewing the 1997 work Defending Middle-Earth: Tolkien: Myth and Modernity for Gale Academic, calls Curry's use of Tolkien's fantasy in the debate about the ecology movement "with its resacralisation of the environment and its neo-pagan overtones" both interesting and wide-ranging. She notes that Curry provides examples on both sides of the debate, but calls it unfortunate that Curry then takes a side and launches "a diatribe" against Tolkien's critics. Stratford Caldecott, reviewing the same book for The Chesterton Review, wrote that Curry had at least one essential qualification for writing about The Lord of the Rings: he loved it. Caldecott states that Curry both does an excellent job of rebutting "accusations of right-wing or authoritarian conservatism" against Tolkien, and instead "paints him as more of a Green subversive", opposing the global "monoculture" which makes everywhere the same. Adam Schwartz, reviewing the book for VII, writes that while Curry is "insightful" in identifying Tolkien's subversion of "prevailing modern norms", his "ideological commitments cloud his comprehension of Tolkien's radicalism". In Schwarz's view, "scholarly analysis and political advocacy are distinct discourses", and blending them is unsatisfactory.

=== Enchantment ===
Bernice Martin, reviewing Curry's 2019 book Enchantment for The Times Literary Supplement, states that Curry came to Buddhism via the New Age movement from seemingly a Christian background, and that in the book he indicts the reductive "modern secular and technocratic culture". Martin admires the way that Curry handles the subject, using his personal experience, collective examples like Princess Diana's funeral, and Tolkien's writings to build a picture of what is wrong with modern society.

=== Deep Roots in a Time of Frost ===
The Tolkien scholar Tom Shippey, in the Journal of Tolkien Research, reviews Curry's 2014 essay collection Deep Roots in a Time of Frost. He lists the main themes as "the nature of 'enchantment' and the need for re-enchantment"; "opposition to 'modernism' and the hopes for post-modernism"; and "the strange nature of critical responses to Tolkien". He endorses the last of these as clearly true, if remarkable. Shippey states that he entirely agrees with Curry about the early literary modernists like T. S. Eliot and James Joyce, but not that modernism remains "as a major and continuing threat" as Curry argues in the book, complete with "the co-dependent power of corporate and finance capital, the modern political state and modern science"; Shippey writes that he is "not happy with this". He notes that Curry is most passionate about the first theme, enchantment. Shippey states that while he cannot always follow Curry or see what he means, he also agrees with him. They agree that enchantment is not the same as magic, but Shippey finds "wonder" in early science fiction, something that Curry would (he writes) link with modernity; and he disagrees that the world has been disenchanted (in Max Weber's phrase). All the same, he suggests that if Tolkien were alive, he would endorse Curry as the critic "closest to the secret of enchantment".

== Books ==
=== Written ===
- 1989 Astrology, Science and Society. Boydell & Brewer.
- 1989 Prophecy and Power: Astrology in Early Modern England. Polity Press, Princeton University Press.
- 1992 A Confusion of Prophets: Victorian and Edwardian Astrology. Collins & Brown.
- 1995 Introducing Machiavelli. Icon.
- 2004 Astrology, Science and Culture: Pulling Down the Moon (with Roy Willis). Berg Publishers.
- 2004 Defending Middle-earth: Tolkien: myth and modernity (reissued with new Afterword). Houghton Mifflin. First published by Floris, 1997.
- 2010 Divination. Ashgate Publishing.
- 2014 Deep Roots in a Time of Frost: Essays on Tolkien. Walking Tree Books.
- 2017 Defending the Humanities: Metaphor, Science and Nature. Rounded Globe.
- 2017 Ecological Ethics: An Introduction (2nd ed.). Polity Press.
- 2019 Enchantment: Wonder in Modern Life. Floris Books.

=== Edited ===
- 2006 Sky and Psyche: The Relationship between Cosmos and Consciousness (with Nicholas Campion). Floris Books.
- 2008 Seeing with Different Eyes: Essays on Astrology and Divination (with Angela Voss). Cambridge Scholars Press.
