= The Road to Middle-Earth =

Book of literary criticism of Tolkien

- First edition
- Author: Tom Shippey
- Language: English
- Subject: Middle-earth
- Genre: Literary criticism
- Publisher: Allen & Unwin
- Publication date: 1982 (3rd. ed. 2005)
- Publication place: United Kingdom
- Media type: Print (hardback & paperback)
- ISBN: 978-0-261-10275-0
- OCLC: 60000827

The Road to Middle-Earth: How J. R. R. Tolkien Created a New Mythology is a scholarly study of the Middle-earth works of J. R. R. Tolkien written by Tom Shippey and first published in 1982. The book discusses Tolkien's philology, and then examines in turn the origins of The Hobbit, The Lord of the Rings, The Silmarillion, and his minor works. An appendix discusses Tolkien's many sources. Two further editions extended and updated the work, including a discussion of Peter Jackson's film version of The Lord of the Rings.

The book's various versions, including new editions in 1993 and 2005, have been welcomed by Tolkien scholars and others as rigorous, convincing, and "the single best book written on Tolkien". Shippey won the 1984 Mythopoeic Scholarship Award in Inklings Studies for the book.

== Book ==
=== Background ===
Tom Shippey is, as Tolkien was, a philologist. Early in his career he taught English at the University of Oxford, using the same syllabus as Tolkien. He became a full professor at the University of Leeds, a post that Tolkien had once held. He then moved to St. Louis University, Missouri. Since the 1980s, he has worked on Tolkien studies, becoming a leading expert on the subject.

=== Synopsis ===
The book discusses Tolkien's inspiration in creating the world of Middle-earth and the writing of works including The Hobbit, The Lord of the Rings, and The Silmarillion. A recurrent theme is that of Tolkien's detailed linguistic studies (particularly of Old Norse and Old English) and the creation of languages (such as Sindarin and Khuzdul) which feature prominently throughout his works.

Shippey discusses the possible location of the original Mirkwood, a term reused by Tolkien, in the 4th-century Goth-Hun borderlands between the Carpathian Mountains and the River Dnieper, their mentions in legend analysed and reconstructed by philology.

The book begins by explaining Tolkien's philology, his belief in its ability to show what happened as the Gothic empire fell in the 4th century as hinted at in brief mentions of the mythical Mirkwood, and his feeling that if he reconstructed an imagined past on such foundations, it would not be wholly false. It then examines the origins of The Hobbit, how Tolkien rebuilt a picture of Elves and Dwarves from the available clues, and from the different ways of speaking of each race, how he ended up writing a richly-characterised story. Three chapters then explore The Lord of the Rings, its map-based plot, its elaborate interlacement of narrative threads, its roots in literature including Shakespeare, and its underlying mythical and Christian themes. A chapter examines The Silmarillion's origins and structure, looking at Christopher Tolkien's 1977 selection from his father's legendarium, and his further selection in 1980, published as Unfinished Tales. These had dark themes, especially of death and immortality, and Shippey notes that readers have found them difficult, providing a good reason for a chapter on them. Another chapter looks at Tolkien's minor works.

An appendix discusses Tolkien's many sources, from the Elder Edda and Beowulf through to the many languages that Tolkien knew. Also attached are four of Tolkien's "asterisk" poems (so called as, like conjectured wordforms, they are not actually recorded in any medieval manuscript), written to appear to be the ancient origins of more recent works: for instance, Ofer Widne Garsecg is stated by Tolkien to be "An Old English version of 'Twas in the broad Atlantic in the equinoctial gales / That a young fellow fell overboard among the sharks and whales'". Two of the poems concern the Birch tree, symbolising to Tolkien the "B" stream of English studies at Oxford, which covered "Lang[uage]" (including Old English) as opposed to "Lit[erature]" (including Shakespeare).

In the third edition, the book concludes with a chapter on Peter Jackson's film version of The Lord of the Rings; it notes the film trilogy's enormous popular and commercial success, and considers how far the films are faithful to the book. In Shippey's view, the films tend both to "democratisation" and to "emotionalisation" of the narrative, though he welcomes the fact that Jackson has brought a fresh audience to Tolkien's work.

=== Publication history ===
The book was first published in 1982, by Allen & Unwin in Great Britain and by Houghton Mifflin in the United States. The second edition, published by HarperCollins in 1993, included discussion of the 12-volume History of Middle-earth edited by Tolkien's son Christopher. The third edition was published in 2003.

The book has been translated into at least four languages. A Polish edition was published in 2001 by Zysk i S-ka in Poznań. A Spanish edition was brought out by Planeta-De Agostini in Barcelona in 2002. A Russian edition appeared in 2003, published by Limbus Press of Saint Petersburg. A German edition was published by Klett-Cotta in Stuttgart in 2018.

== Reception ==
Jessica Yates, in Mythlore, writes that Shippey, a holder of Tolkien's old professorial chair at Leeds, and a Tolkien fan, had two goals for the book: to explain to instinctive lovers of Lord of the Rings why they are right to do so; and to refute the hostile criticism from literary figures like Edmund Wilson. She states that this second reason explains "the rigorous tone" of the book.

Kirkus Reviews in 1983 called the work "In sum: the most useful book on Tolkien since the Carpenter biography". The review describes the book as an "erratically enlightening study", one that sometimes goes into great detail on minute points, but that powerfully sets out a major thesis. This is, states the review, that clues from philological study – Tolkien's profession – of Old English and other languages of that period suggested "the greatness of some hidden pre-literate Northern past", and that Tolkien set about inventing "the world that should have existed for legend to take place in, and constructed the epic that should have lain behind the 'asterisk-world' of philogical conjecture".

Gergely Nagy, in Tolkien Studies, writes that the 2005 revision is "the good old Road", with useful additions. The book was in his view from 1982 "emblematic" of the "source-study" or "comparative study" approach to Tolkien criticism. Nagy calls it "the seminal monograph", and recalls that Glen GoodKnight, founder of the Mythopoeic Society, had called it "the best single book written on Tolkien". GoodKnight noted, too, Shippey's comments in the preface to the second edition that he had not had to make many changes despite the publication of Christopher Tolkien's detailed The History of Middle-earth, meaning that his early predictions had proven accurate.

Charles Moseley, in The Observer in 2000, writes that the book demonstrated that Shippey was "one of Tolkien's most acute critics and convincing apologists".

The historian Bradley J. Birzer, reviewing another of Shippey's books, his 2000 J. R. R. Tolkien: Author of the Century in Catholic Social Science Review, writes that it contains similar information to his scholarly The Road to Middle-Earth, but aimed at a well-educated general audience.

Michael Drout and Hilary Wynne comment that "The real brilliance of Road was in method: Shippey would relentlessly gather small philological facts and combine them into unassailable logical propositions; part of the pleasure of reading Road lies in watching all these pieces fall into place and Shippey's larger arguments materialize out of the welter of interesting detail."

== Awards ==
In 1984 the first edition of the book received the Mythopoeic Scholarship Award in Inklings Studies, an award "given to books on J.R.R. Tolkien ... that make significant contributions to Inklings scholarship."

== See also ==
- Beowulf in Middle-earth – the influence of Tolkien's favourite medieval work on his own writing

== Sources ==
- Shippey, Tom (2005) [1982]. The Road to Middle-Earth: How J. R. R. Tolkien Created a New Mythology (Third ed.). HarperCollins. ISBN 978-0-261-10275-0.
