= Catharine R. Stimpson =

Feminist scholar and professor

Academic background
- Education: Bryn Mawr College, Cambridge University, Columbia University
- Thesis: (1967)

Catharine R. Stimpson is a feminist scholar and dean emerita of the Graduate School of Arts and Science at New York University. She was the founding editor of Signs: Journal of Women in Culture and Society and has held teaching and administrative positions at Barnard College, Rutgers University, and New York University.

== Early life and education ==
Stimpson was born and raised in Bellingham, Washington. She attended the Campus School at what became Western Washington University, followed by Bellingham High School.

She received an A.B. in English, magna cum laude, from Bryn Mawr College in 1958. At Newnham College, Cambridge, she received a B.A. with honors in 1960 and an M.A. in 1966. She completed a Ph.D. with distinction at Columbia University in 1967.

== Academic career ==
Stimpson began her academic career at Barnard College. In 1971, she became the founding acting director of the Women's Center, subsequently known as the Barnard Center for Research on Women. She chaired the task force that established the center and introduced courses in women and literature and Black literature at Barnard.

She became the founding editor of Signs: Journal of Women in Culture and Society, which began publication in 1975. Jean Sacks, manager of the journals division at the University of Chicago Press, approached Stimpson about editing the journal at Barnard's 1974 Scholar and the Feminist conference. Stimpson edited Signs from 1975 to 1980. She also edited a University of Chicago Press book series on women, culture, and society.

In 1980, Stimpson joined Rutgers University as a professor of English. Her subsequent positions there included director of the Institute for Research on Women, dean of the Graduate School, vice provost for graduate education, and university professor.

After a leave from Rutgers to serve as Director of the MacArthur Fellows Program, she joined New York University in 1998 as university professor and dean of the Graduate School of Arts and Science. She became dean emerita in 2010. At NYU, she had appointments in the Department of English, the Steinhardt Institute for Higher Education Policy, and the School of Law. Her affiliations also included New York University Abu Dhabi and the Department of Applied Statistics, Social Science, and Humanities in NYU's Steinhardt School. By September 2022, she held the titles of professor emerita and dean emerita at NYU.

Stimpson served as president of the Modern Language Association in 1990 and as president of the Association of Graduate Schools of the Association of American Universities in 1999–2000.

== MacArthur Fellows ==
As director of the MacArthur Fellows Program from 1993 to 1997. During her tenure, the program broadened its selection of recipients beyond established scholars.

== Public service ==
Stimpson has chaired the New York State Council for the Humanities, the National Council for Research on Women, and the Ms. magazine Board of Scholars. She has also served on the board of PBS and chaired the board of Scholars at Risk, an international network supporting academic freedom.

She served on the board of the Paul & Daisy Soros Fellowships for New Americans from 1998 to 2014.

Stimpson chaired the board of Creative Capital and subsequently served as co-chair of its National Advisory Council.

She is a member of the board of trustees of Bennington College. She joined the Governing Council of the Bologna-based Magna Charta Observatory on March 14, 2019. Her second term is scheduled to end on March 21, 2027.

Stimpson served on the jury for the 2007 Pulitzer Prize for Fiction.

== Awards and honors ==
In 2011, Stimpson received the Francis Andrew March Award for Distinguished Service to the Profession from the Association of Departments of English, part of the Modern Language Association.

Her website lists 18 honorary degrees awarded between 1989 and 2018. These include an honorary Doctor of Humane Letters from Western Washington University, awarded on June 16, 2018, and an honorary doctorate from the University of Ottawa in 2018.

The Catharine Stimpson Prize for Outstanding Feminist Scholarship is named in her honor. Awarded biennially, it recognizes an article by an emerging feminist scholar; the winning article is published in Signs.

== Publications ==
In addition to being the founding editor of Signs, Stimpson has written two books, edited seven books, and published over 150 monographs, essays, stories, and reviews.

Her novel Class Notes was published under the name Kate Stimpson. It was reviewed in the literary journal International Fiction Review in 1980. Her essay collection Where the Meanings Are: Feminism and Cultural Spaces appeared in 1988.

Stimpson and Harriet Chessman edited a two-volume edition of Gertrude Stein's writings for the Library of America, published in 1998.

Her earlier publications include J. R. R. Tolkien (1969). She also co-edited Women, Sex and Sexuality (1980) and Women and the American City (1981), and contributed to edited collections on women's studies and literary criticism.

Her academic articles include “Zero Degree Deviancy: The Lesbian Novel in English”, published in Critical Inquiry in 1981, and “Bathing in reeking wounds: The liberal arts, beauty, and war”, published in Arts and Humanities in Higher Education in 2014.

With Gilbert Herdt, Stimpson edited Critical Terms for the Study of Gender (2014). The book was included among Choice magazine's top 25 Outstanding Academic Titles for 2015.

Stimpson wrote the introduction to the 2025 Warbler Press edition of Patricia Highsmith's novel The Price of Salt.
