= Tolkien's prose style =

Literary style in Tolkien's fiction

The prose style of J. R. R. Tolkien's Middle-earth books, especially The Lord of the Rings, is remarkably varied. Commentators have noted that Tolkien selected linguistic registers to suit different peoples, such as simple and modern for Hobbits and more archaic for Dwarves, Elves, and the Rohirrim. This allowed him to use the Hobbits to mediate between the modern reader and the heroic and archaic realm of fantasy. The Orcs, too, are depicted in different voices: the Orc-leader Grishnákh speaks in bullying tones, while the minor functionary Gorbag uses grumbling modern speech.

Tolkien's prose style was attacked by scholars of literature such as Catharine R. Stimpson and Burton Raffel in the 1960s, and by Michael Moorcock in the 1970s. It has more recently been analysed more favourably, both by other novelists such as Ursula Le Guin, and by scholars such as Brian Rosebury and Tom Shippey. Where Stimpson called Tolkien's diction needlessly complex, Rosebury argues that even in the example she chose, Tolkien was as plain and simple as Ernest Hemingway. He analyses a passage where Merry has just helped to kill the Witch-King. Tolkien begins this in plain language, modulating into a higher register to deal with the echoes of ancient and magical history.

== Syntax and diction ==
=== Hostile literary reception ===
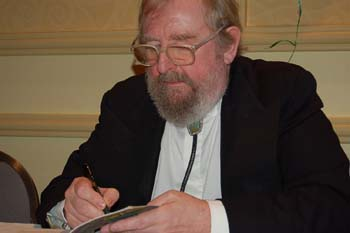
Literary figures including Michael Moorcock criticized Tolkien's writing style in the 1960s and 1970s.

In his lifetime, J. R. R. Tolkien's fantasy writing, especially The Lord of the Rings, became extremely popular with the public, but was rejected by literary figures such as Burton Raffel, partly on stylistic grounds. Catharine R. Stimpson, a scholar of English, wrote in 1969 that Tolkien not only "shun[s] ordinary diction, he also wrenches syntax". She supported her argument by inventing what she asserted were Tolkienistic sentences such as "To an eyot he came." In 1978, the science fiction writer Michael Moorcock, in his essay Epic Pooh, criticized Tolkien for utilizing a comforting and unchallenging writing style reflective of a "conservative misanthropism", and in 2001, The New York Times reviewer Judith Shulevitz criticized his style's "pedantry", saying that he "formulated a high-minded belief in the importance of his mission as a literary preservationist, which turns out to be death to literature itself."

=== Plain as Hemingway ===
The scholar of humanities Brian Rosebury systematically replies to each item in Stimpson's attack, showing that Tolkien mostly uses plain modern English. He locates the three places where Tolkien uses "eyot", arguing that "island" could not in these instances be used instead without loss of meaning. In "Still there are dangerous places even before we come there: rocks and stony eyots in the stream", "islands" is possible, he writes, but "'eyot' more firmly suggests something small enough to be overlooked until one runs aground". All three, Rosebury writes, are unexceptional in 20th century syntax: "Ernest Hemingway could have written them". More recently, Thomas Kullmann and Dirk Siepmann have applied corpus linguistics to analyse his text quantitatively.

=== Justified grandeur ===
Rosebury studies several examples of Tolkien's diction in The Lord of the Rings at length, citing passages and analysing them in detail to show what they achieve. One is the moment when the Hobbit Merry has helped to kill the Witch-King, the leader of the Ringwraiths, and finds himself standing alone on the battlefield. Part of the quoted passage runs:

And still Meriadoc stood there blinking through his tears, and no one spoke to him, indeed none seemed to heed him... And behold! there lay his weapon, but the blade was smoking like a dry branch that has been thrust in a fire; and as he watched, it writhed and withered and was consumed. So passed the sword of the Barrow-Downs, work of Westernesse. But glad would he have been to know its fate who wrought it slowly long ago in the North-Kingdom when the Dunedain were young, and chief among their foes was the dread realm of Angmar and its sorcerer king. No other blade, not though mightier hands had wielded it, would have dealt that foe a wound so bitter, cleaving the undead flesh, breaking the spell that knit his unseen sinews to his will. (Note: Tolkien 1955, book 5, ch. 6 "The Battle of the Pelennor Fields")

Rosebury writes that this begins with "essentially plain syntax", as if Merry were speaking; but "woven into the clauses" are subtle clues in the syntax, like "heed" rather than "notice", and the Hobbit's full name Meriadoc to stay in touch with the un-Hobbitlike "heroic tonality" of the passage. The first sentence of the second paragraph, he notes, heralds a shift of mood, as does the following "But glad would he have been", with effective use of inversion. Rosebury shows how awkward the uninverted form would have been: "But he who wrought it long ago ... would have been glad to know its fate." The passage ends with a powerfully musical sentence with assonances between "blade", "wield", "dealt" and so on; alliteration with "wield", "wound", "will"; memorable phrases like "unseen sinews"; and the immediacy of the present participles "cleaving...breaking", the implied "and" importantly suppressed. Rosebury states that the wide range of styles could have become an untidy mess, but the narrative is big enough to allow Tolkien to modulate gracefully between low and high.

=== Incorporating the archaic, even Old English ===
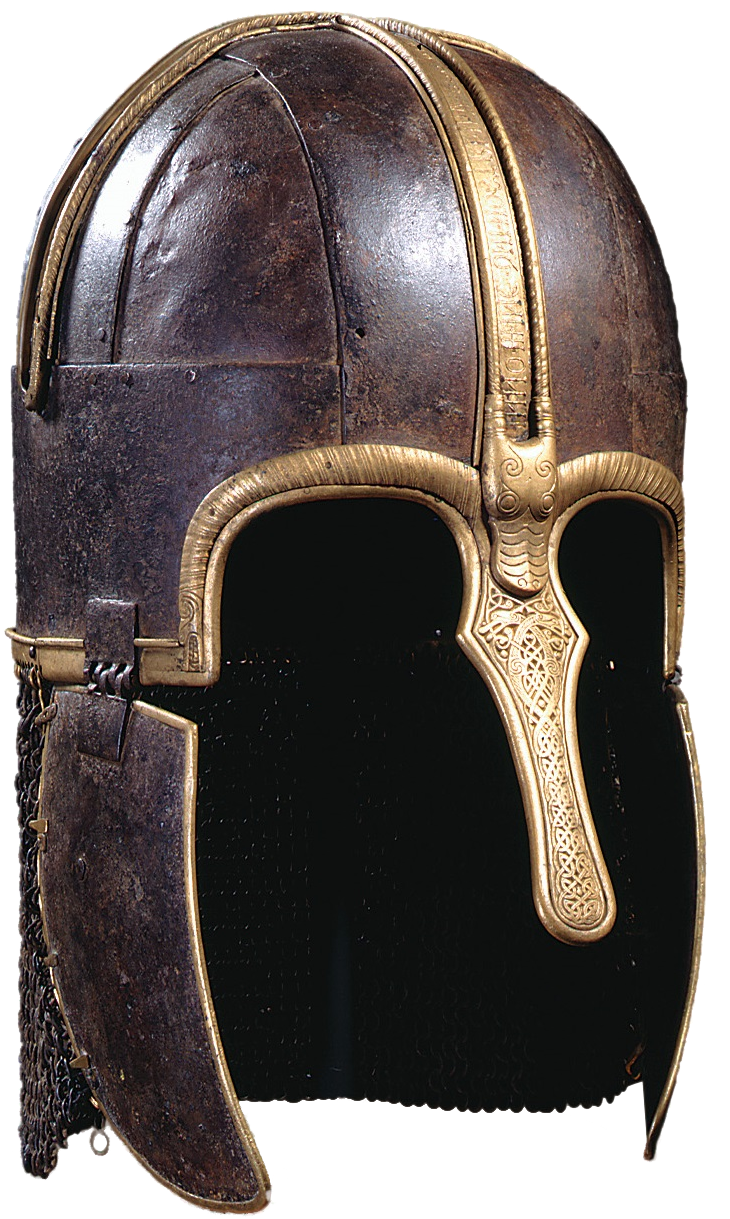
With the language he uses for the Riders of Rohan, Tolkien effectively evokes the Anglo-Saxons. Coppergate Helmet shown

In his book The Power of Tolkien's Prose, Steve Walker writes that Tolkien's diction incorporates both newly-coined words like "eleventy-first" and "beautifuller", and occasional archaism. He notes that there are only a few actually archaic words, and that Tolkien uses them only rarely, such as "alas", "thou", and "whither". All the same, the diction of The Lord of the Rings "manages to seem in its essence nostalgic, maybe even archaic".

Tolkien goes furthest with the Riders of Rohan, giving them "Anglo-Saxon syntactic patterns" and diction which is "stirring, alliteratively stately, [and] stern". He gives Rohan speakers words "rescued from total obscurity" like "éored", Old English for "a troop of cavalry", "dwimmerlaik", and "mearas". The names of the Rohirrim are straightforwardly Old English: Éomer and Háma (characters in Beowulf), Éowyn ("Horse-joy"), Théoden ("King"). So too is their language, with words like Éothéod ("Horse-people"), Éored ("Troop of cavalry"), and Eorlingas ("people of Eorl", whose name means "[Horse-]lord", cf. Earl), where many words and names begin with the word for "horse", eo[h]. Finally, Tolkien has his Riders of Rohan speak a few phrases directly in Old English, as when Éomer shouts "Westu Théoden hál!" ("Long Live Théoden!").

Walker comments, however, that much of the impression of antiquity comes not from Old English but from more recent, more familiar words such as "deem", "moot", and "wight", and that Tolkien combines these with words that are still current like "darkling" and "westering", thus bringing out their "archaic overtones".

=== Simple but varied ===
In 2001, the fantasy novelist Ursula Le Guin wrote a sympathetic account of Tolkien's prose style, arguing as Michael Drout writes that "the craftsmanship of The Lord of the Rings is consistent at all levels of construction, from the individual sentence to the macro structure of the journey, a repeated stress and release pattern". Allan Turner called Le Guin's contribution an "insightful though rather impressionistic appraisal"; he demonstrated with examples that Tolkien's style is both generally simple, using parataxis – sentences without subordinate clauses or causal conjunctions – and varied, adapted to the race and standing of the speaker, and using special stylistic effects at key moments in the story.

Turner describes how Tolkien varies his style for the second eucatastrophe in the Battle of the Pelennor Fields. At the moment when the horsemen of Rohan are beginning to tire, and the battle is hanging in the balance, their leader, Éomer, realises that he is looking not at the disastrous arrival of an enemy fleet of the Corsairs of Umbar, but at the unlooked-for arrival of Aragorn and Men of southern Gondor in captured ships:

And then wonder took him, and a great joy, and he cast his sword up in the sunlight and sang as he caught it. And all eyes followed his gaze, and behold! upon the foremost ship a great standard broke, and the wind displayed it as she turned towards the Harlond.

Turner notes that the paratactic style here, with the repeated use of "and" in the manner of the New Testament, is "stylistically marked", indicating something out of the ordinary. The Tolkien scholar Tom Shippey calls such deliberate use of the conjunction, avoiding explicit logical connection, "loose semantic fit". Turner writes that readers experience the shift in style as "an impression of exalted register" because of the biblical association, even though Tolkien uses few unusual or archaic words in the passage.

=== Suggestive, inviting the reader's response ===
The poet W. H. Auden, reviewing The Lord of the Rings in 1956, wrote that "I rarely remember a book about which I have had such violent arguments." Walker comments that Tolkien has probably been praised more than any other 20th century fiction author, noting that he has been likened to everything from the Epic of Gilgamesh, the Book of Genesis, the Odyssey, Beowulf, and the Prose Edda to the prose of Augustine, Henry James, Joyce, Kafka, and D. H. Lawrence, the poetry of Ariosto, Arnold, Blake, Browning, Chaucer, Coleridge, Dante, Keats, Malory, Spenser, Milton, Shelley, Shakespeare, and Tennyson, or indeed the music of Verdi and Wagner. Walker adds that he has equally been criticised from many directions, the only constant factor being "violent" disagreement on almost every point. He suggests that a cause of this confusion may be the "richness of his art", so complex as to elicit a "kaleidoscopic" variety of reactions. Walker's explanation of Tolkien's success is that Tolkien's writing is "strikingly invitational", relying on suggestion to elicit a vivid and individual response from each reader. The price of this is that responses vary widely, as the critics' comments show.

== Characterisation by style ==
From the 1990s onwards, novelists and scholars began to adopt a more favourable view of Tolkien's place in literature. The 2014 A Companion to J. R. R. Tolkien in particular marked Tolkien's acceptance in the literary canon, with essays by major Tolkien scholars on style and many other aspects of his writing. Kullmann and Siepmann observe that characters such as Sam Gamgee and Gollum are marked out by their non-standard speech. Walker comments that Tolkien uses language to expand his readers' imaginations:

His prose is taut with semantic ambiguities tending to widen potential meaning—the contradictory consonances of paradox, the incremental implications of emblem, the topsy-turvy profundity of irony.

And further:

Tolkien's style is at every level from word choice to narrative pattern an open invitation to subcreation. Invitational undercurrents of narrative and character and semantic development everywhere in this proactive prose sweep the reader toward deeper implicit meanings, wider imaginative awareness.

— Steve Walker, The Power of Tolkien's Prose, 2009

=== Hobbits as mediators with the heroic ===
Turner states that The Lord of the Rings makes use of several styles of prose, with discrete linguistic registers for different characters, peoples, and cultures. In his view, Tolkien intentionally creates a contrast between the simple modern style of the Hobbits and more archaizing language for the Dwarves, Elves, and Riders of Rohan. The genre of the work begins with novelistic realism in the Shire, where the down-to-earth Hobbits live, climbing to high romance for the defeat of the Dark Lord Sauron, and descending to realism again for the return to the Shire. Kullmann and Siepmann comment that from the first page of the novel, written from the point of view of the people of Hobbiton, the reader hears a "common-sensical, no-nonsense [Hobbit] perspective, from which fantastic, fairy-tale creatures like dwarves appear 'outlandish'." Further, Turner notes, Tolkien avoids the expression of modern concepts when describing pre-modern cultures.

Tolkien stated that he intentionally changed the speaking style of certain individual characters to suit their interactions with other characters, mentioning that "the more learned and able among the Hobbits", including Frodo, were "quick to note and adopt the style of those whom they met". (Note: Tolkien 1955, Appendix F, "The Languages and Peoples of the Third Age") Shippey explains that the Hobbits serve as mediators between the ordinary modern world and the heroic and archaic fantasy realm, making The Hobbit and The Lord of the Rings readily accessible. Such mediation is effected early in The Lord of the Rings by having the Hobbits present the archaic characters in their own way, as when Pippin "attempts a formal register" with the words "O Wise People!" (Note: Tolkien 1954a, book 1, ch. 3 "Three is Company") on meeting the High Elf Gildor in the woods of the Shire.

=== Ancient clashing with modern ===
Shippey analyses some of the cultures that clash in "The Council of Elrond". (Note: Tolkien 1954a, book 2, ch. 2, "The Council of Elrond") The Wizard Gandalf reports on what he heard from Gaffer Gamgee, a simple old Hobbit in the Shire: "'I can't abide changes', said he, 'not at my time of life, and least of all changes for the worst'". Shippey writes that his proverb-rich language speaks of psychological unpreparedness, and a sort of baseline of normality. Gaffer Gamgee's son Sam speaks slightly better in Shippey's view, with his "A nice pickle we have landed ourselves in, Mr Frodo", as he is refusing to see Mordor as anything bigger than "a pickle", the "Anglo-hobbitic inability to know when they're beaten". Gandalf then introduces the traitorous Wizard Saruman, his slipperiness "conveyed by style and lexis":

we can bide our time, we can keep our thoughts in our hearts, deploring maybe evils done by the way, but approving the high and ultimate purpose: Knowledge, Rule, Order... There need not be, there would not be, any real change in our designs, only in our means".

Shippey comments that no other character in the book uses words so empty of meaning as "real", "deploring", and "ultimate", and that Saruman's speech contains several modern evils – betraying allies, preferring ends to means, W. H. Auden's "conscious acceptance of guilt in the necessary murder". Rosebury comments that Saruman has a "convincingly" wide repertoire of speaking styles: "colloquial, diplomatic, intimidatory, vituperative". In his view, Gandalf has both a broad range of diction and powerful rhetoric; he is able to deploy warm humour as well as irony; and he narrates, explains, and argues effectively. Given "his nomadic life, linguistic skill and far-reaching intelligence", he can vary his speaking style as widely as Tolkien's narrative, from relaxed Hobbit conversation to "exalted narration". Rosebury cites Elizabeth Kirk's remark that Tolkien uses each style not mainly to "define the individuality of the given speaker or situation, but to enact the kind of consciousness he shares with others who have a comparable stance before experience", but he suggests instead that often there is simply a "Common Speech" shared by Men, Elves, and Dwarves with not much to differentiate them.

In comparison to these modern voices, Tolkien makes the other Council members speak in an "archaic, blunt, clearsighted" way. The leading Elf, Elrond, uses antique words like "esquire", "shards" (of a sword), and "weregild", along with "old-fashioned inversions of syntax", remarking for instance "Now, therefore, things shall be openly spoken that have been hidden from all but a few until this day". Other voices too are distinctively old: the Dwarf Glóin strikes a "heroic note" with his report of the Dwarf-King Dáin's defiant response to Sauron's messenger, who asks for news of a lost ring, and says that if Dáin does not do as he asks

"Refuse, and things will not seem so well. Do you refuse?"

At that his breath came like the hiss of snakes, and all who stood by shuddered, but Dáin said: "I say neither yea nor nay. I must consider this message and what it means under its fair cloak."

"Consider well, but not too long", said he.

"The time of my thought is my own to spend", answered Dáin.

"For the present", said he, and rode into the darkness.

Shippey observes that the messenger's polite "things will not seem so well" comes over as a dire threat, while Dáin's "fair cloak" evidently means "foul body". The effect is to convey the Dwarves' "unyielding scepticism" in the face of danger. He concludes that most of the information given in the chapter is carried not by narrative but by linguistic mode: "Language variation gives Tolkien a thorough and economical way of dramatising ethical debate."

Walker adds that the sense of time which brings the past and the future into the present is created both by Tolkien's ambiguity about the numinous, and by his use of the ubi sunt theme. The poem "Where now the horse and the rider" (Note: Tolkien 1954, book 3, ch. 6 "The King of the Golden Hall") directly echoes the ubi sunt section in the Old English poem The Wanderer. Less obviously, the theme is revisited, "usually with incidental casualness", to create an elegiac tone and a feeling of deep time and history behind what can be seen, as when the Hobbit Pippin sees the great stone city of Minas Tirith for the first time: "Pippin guessed of great men and kindreds that had once dwelt there; and yet now they were silent, and no footstep rang on their wide pavements, nor voice was heard in their walls, nor any face looked out from door or empty window". (Note: Tolkien 1955, book 5, ch. 1 "Minas Tirith")

=== Varied dialogue types for the enemy ===
Rosebury writes that whereas some critics have asserted that the monstrous Orcs are represented as "working class", Tolkien had in fact created at least three types of Orc-dialogue for different ranks and tribes within their "closed militarist culture of hatred and cruelty"; and none of these is working class. He describes the Mordor Orc-leader Grishnákh as "comparatively cerebral", speaking "like a melodrama villain, or a public-school bully". Merry and Pippin are told:

"My dear tender little fools", hissed Grishnákh, "everything you have, and everything you know, will be got out of you in due time: everything! You'll wish there was more that you could tell to satisfy the Questioner, indeed you will: quite soon. We shan't hurry the enquiry. Oh dear no! What do you think you've been kept alive for? My dear little fellows, please believe me when I say that it was not out of kindness: that's not even one of Uglúk's faults." (Note: Tolkien 1954, book 3, ch. 3 "The Uruk-Hai")

Anna Vaninskaya writes that the most modern idiom in The Lord of the Rings is used by the Orcs overheard by Frodo and Sam in Mordor. Tolkien gives them the speech of the twentieth century, whether as soldiers, functionaries in party or government, or "minor officials in a murderous bureaucracy". Gorbag says:

"I'm not easy in my mind. As I said, the Big Bosses, ay", his voice sank almost to a whisper, "ay, even the Biggest, can make mistakes. Something nearly slipped you say. I say, something has slipped. And we've got to look out. Always the poor Uruks to put slips right, and small thanks. But don't forget: the enemies don't love us any more than they love Him, and if they get topsides on Him, we're done too." (Note: Tolkien 1954, book 4, ch. 10, "The Choices of Master Samwise")

She writes that Tolkien captures, too, "the clipped language of army dispatches":

"A message came: Nazgûl uneasy. Spies feared on Stairs. Double vigilance. Patrol to head of Stairs. I came at once."

Also quite modern, she writes, is frustration with whatever headquarters is up to:

"Bad business", said Gorbag. "See here - our Silent Watchers were uneasy more than two days ago, that I know. But my patrol wasn't ordered out for another day, nor any message sent to Lugbúrz either: owing to the Great Signal going up, and the High Nazgûl going off to the war, and all that. And then they couldn't get Lugbúrz to pay attention for a good while, I'm told."

=== Distinctive individuality ===
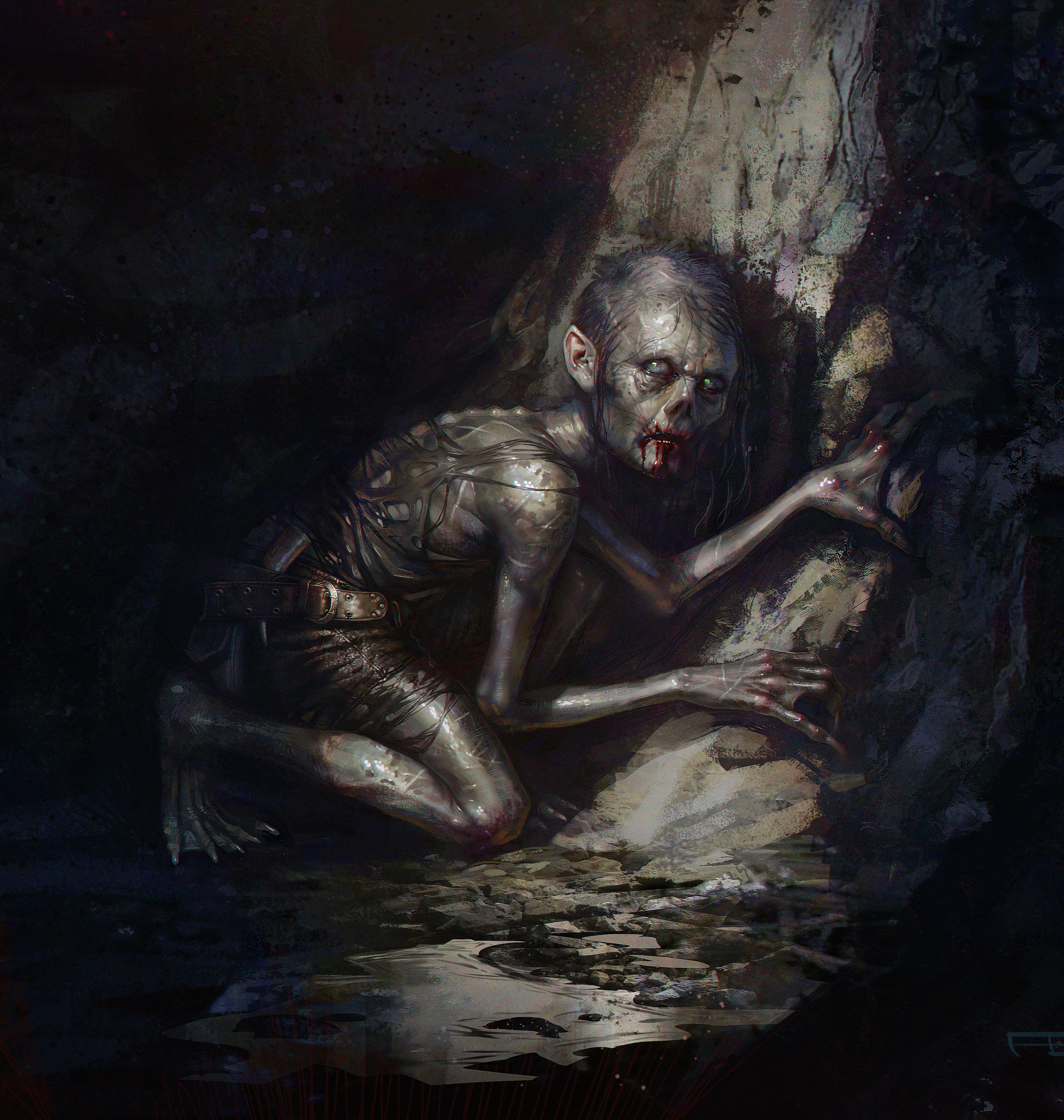
The scholar Brian Rosebury considers Tolkien's depiction of Gollum (pictured) his most memorable success.

Rosebury considers that Tolkien's "most memorable success" of voice is the monster Gollum's "extraordinary idiolect", with its obsessive repetition, its infantile whining, its minimal syntax and its unstable sense of being one or two people, hinting at mental illness; "Gollum's moral deformity is like that of an unregenerate child grown old, in whom the unattractive infant qualities of selfishness, cruelty and self-pitying dependency are monstrously preserved and isolated."

Kullmann and Siepmann state that the eight members of the Fellowship of the Ring (barring Boromir, who dies early in the narrative) are clearly distinguished by their style of speech. They consider Sam Gamgee and Aragorn to be the most distinctively individual, for their colloquialism and "archaic and literary" speech respectively. Legolas and Gimli always use a literary style, often with proverbs; and both consider the past more significant than what Legolas calls "these after-days". In contrast to those "epical" characters, Merry and Pippin speak the ordinary colloquial English used in Tolkien's time. They differ from each other in that Merry makes direct statements, while Pippin characteristically asks questions. Gandalf speaks the most of any character. He talks plainly, neither archaically nor colloquially, sometimes using complex sentences. He varies his style of speech depending on who he is speaking to; and he often uses the imperative, whether for direct commands or to encourage the rest of the Fellowship. Finally, Frodo speaks often, but usually in short utterances, whether exclamations, questions, or answers. Like Gandalf, he can vary his style when speaking to Elves, Dwarves, or Men rather than Hobbits: he uses courtly politeness with Gildor – including the "high-elven" Quenya greeting Elen síla lúmenn' omentielvo "A star shines on the hour of our meeting", with Glóin, and with Faramir.

Speech styles of the Fellowship of the Ring, after Kullmann and Siepmann
Character	Style	Speech habits	Notes
Aragorn	Archaic, literary	Inversion ("there my heart is")	Often about his own history
Frodo	Plain, flexible	Insecure, doubtful	Educated, can be complex, polite
Gandalf	Plain, flexible	Commands	Can use complex sentences
Gimli	Literary	Proverbs, exclamations	Linked to mining, work
Legolas	Literary	Proverbs	Linked to nature, contemplation
Merry	Colloquial, familiar	Direct statements	Down to earth, commonsensical
Pippin	Colloquial, familiar	Questions, exclamations	Enthusiastic, concerned with food and comfort
Sam	Colloquial, rustic, working class	Inventive, metaphorical	Often politely hedged ("if you take my meaning")

== Narrative quality ==
=== Visual imagination ===
Rosebury writes that the "distinctive best" style in The Lord of the Rings is seen neither in dialogue nor in moments of action, but in "narrative that is at once dynamic and sensuously alert". He selects a passage from The Two Towers, stating that Tolkien's visual imagination here is "at its sharpest", and that he characteristically takes a static vantage point (in Ithilien), building up a panorama from there:

To the right the Mountains of Gondor glowed, remote in the West, under a fire-flecked sky. To the left lay darkness: the towering walls of Mordor; and out of that darkness the long valley came, falling steeply in an ever-widening trough towards the Anduin. At its bottom ran a hurrying stream: Frodo could hear its stony voice coming up through the silence; and beside it on the hither side a road went winding down like a pale ribbon, down into chill grey mists that no gleam of sunset touched. There it seemed to Frodo that he descried far off, floating as it were on a shadowy sea, the high dim tops and broken pinnacles of old towers forlorn and dark. (Note: Tolkien 1954, book 4, ch. 7 "Journey To The Cross-Roads")

=== Ambiguous, leaving freedom for the reader ===
Walker states that Tolkien's prose leaves ample freedom for the reader through its ceaseless ambiguity in many dimensions, such as in diction, in balancing psychological reality against "imaginative possibility", in description of characters and landscape, in tone, between past and present, and between the ordinariness and almost pantheistic animation of nature.

The Tolkien scholar Verlyn Flieger notes that The Lord of the Rings has constantly attracted conflicting analyses, such as those of neo-pagans and evangelical Christians. Tolkien replied ambiguously, or gave conflicting statements of his own view. Flieger states that he "trimmed his sails to meet winds from different directions", noting that the book offers "richness and multivalent texture", enabling every reader to take what they personally need and want. In her view, Tolkien was trying to "harmonize his work's originality and his own imagination with Christian orthodoxy, and to situate his often unorthodox views within the narrower confines of his religion without abandoning either." Flieger quotes Judith Thurman's remark that "A coherent personality aspires, like a work of art, to contain its conflicts without resolving them dogmatically", stating that Tolkien had the advantage of being inclusive enough to achieve this. Flieger ends by stating that the book is "not a story about good and evil but a story about how good can become evil, a story whose strength lies in the tension created by deliberately unresolved situations and conflicts... [tapping] into that 'reservoir of power' below the visible world."

Shippey writes that Tolkien made multiple equivocal statements about fantasy itself, in his essay "On Fairy-Stories" and his poem "Mythopoeia". In Shippey's view, Tolkien was expressing his conviction that "fantasy is not entirely made up", but was at once what Tolkien called "the Sub-creative art in itself" and "derived from the Image", existing like Tolkien's beloved Old English words before any philologist (such as Tolkien himself) began to study them. So Tolkien was lucky enough to be able in his fiction to "balance exactly between 'dragon-as-simple-beast' and 'dragon-as-just-allegory', between pagan and Christian worlds, on a pinpoint of literary artifice and mythic suggestion."

=== Almost poetry ===
Scholars have remarked that, quite apart from the poetry embedded in his novels, Tolkien's prose in several places takes on the quality of poetry. Walker writes that Treebeard's "lament for the lost entwives ... in its rhythmic sensitivity, its conceptual integrity, and the lyric intensity of its elegiac sensuousness ... is obviously poetic". He arranges Treebeard's words as a poem to illustrate his point:

When the world was young, and the woods were wide and wild,
The Ents and the Entwives—and there were Entmaidens then,
They walked together and they housed together.
...
But the Entwives gave their minds to the lesser trees,
And to the meads in the sunshine beyond the feet of forests,
And they saw the sloe in the thicket,...

Several scholars write that Tom Bombadil's speech, too, is essentially all in a poetic metre; that he frequently breaks into actual song; and that his power is expressed by singing.

What? Old Man Willow?
Naught worse than that, eh?
That can soon be mended.
I know the tune for him.
Old grey Willow-man!
I'll freeze his marrow cold,
if he don't behave himself.
I'll sing his roots off.
I'll sing a wind up and
blow leaf and branch away.
Old Man Willow!

— A sample of Tom Bombadil's speech (Note: Tolkien 1954a, book 1, ch. 6 "The Old Forest")

=== Storytelling ===
There are some 45 to 50 stories embedded in the text of The Lord of the Rings, supposedly narrated by 23 of the novel's characters. A whole chapter of Book 2, "The Council of Elrond", is devoted to stories told by one character after another. The stories in the novel include tales of recent events; tales of the time before Frodo set off from Bag End; and mythological tales. About half of The Lord of the Rings consists of dialogue, poetry, or stories told by a character. The other half is narrative, often from the point of view of one of the characters, and usually – 85% of the time – a Hobbit protagonist. The relatively rare omniscient narrator sections use other styles: geographic descriptions have some resemblance to a travel guide. These sections do not further the action, but make Middle-earth feel objectively real as well as subjectively experienced. Other omniscient narrator passages are in epic style, marking out characters as old-style heroes. The epic style is characterised by archaic diction, parataxis with clauses linked with "and", plentiful imagery, and a richly poetical use of descriptive words.

== The Silmarillion ==
The Silmarillion, by contrast with The Lord of the Rings, is written in a compressed style, in which events are briefly documented as if in annals recording history and legend, rather than described with much focus on persons or the niceties of conventional storytelling. Shippey states that The Silmarillion comes across to the reader as a more distant and mythic work than The Lord of the Rings; there was in his view no place for humorously earthy Hobbits in the "more rarefied air" of that work. Many chapters have little in the way of dialogue, though "Of Túrin Turambar" (Note: Tolkien 1977, Ch. 21 "Of Túrin Turambar") is an exception. The cheerful informality of the Hobbits is lacking, making the work feel more difficult.

Tolkien wrote elements of his legendarium, the Silmarillion sensu lato, throughout his life, in a wide variety of styles. The journalist Nicholas Lezard comments, for instance, that The Children of Húrin's prose style "is far from that breezy, homely donnishness that characterises The Hobbit and the first book of The Lord of the Rings". In his view, it starts "almost impenetrably" with "'Hador Goldenhead was a lord of the Edain and well-beloved by the Eldar. He dwelt while his days lasted under the lordship of Fingolfin, who gave to him wide lands in that region of Hithlum which was called Dor-lómin.' To which the unfamiliar reader may well ask: who? The who? The who? Who? And where?" He grants, however, that the work "does have a strange atmosphere all of its own".
