= Minas Tirith =

Fictional city in Middle-earth

- J. R. R. Tolkien's legendarium location
- "Stanburg (Minas Tirith)" by J.R.R. Tolkien. An early sketch and a re-rendering of a previous attempt he made at illustrating the city.

In-universe information
- Type: Fortified city; capital of Gondor
- Ruled by: Kings and Stewards of Gondor
- Locations: the Citadel, the Great Gate, Rath Dínen, the Tower of Ecthelion, the White Tree
- Location: Gondor
- Lifespan: Built S.A. 3320
- Founder: Anárion

Minas Tirith is the capital of Gondor in J. R. R. Tolkien's fantasy novel The Lord of the Rings. It is a seven-walled fortress city built on the spur of a mountain, rising some 700 feet to a high terrace, housing the Citadel, at the seventh level. Atop this is the 300-foot high Tower of Ecthelion, which contains the throne room.

Scholars, following various leads in Tolkien's fantasy and letters, have attempted to identify Minas Tirith with several different historical or mythical cities, including Troy, Rome, Ravenna, and Constantinople.

In Peter Jackson's film adaptation of The Lord of the Rings, Minas Tirith was given something of the look of a city of the Byzantine Empire, while its seven-tiered shape was suggested by the tidal island and abbey of Mont Saint-Michel in France. Tolkien illustrators including Alan Lee, John Howe, Jef Murray, and Ted Nasmith have all produced realistic paintings of the city.

== Description ==
For partly in the primeval shaping of the hill, partly by the mighty craft and labour of old, there stood up from the rear of the wide court behind the Gate a towering bastion of stone, its edge sharp as a ship-keel facing east. Up it rose, even to the level of the topmost circle, and there was crowned by a battlement; so that those in the Citadel might look from its peak sheer down upon the Gate seven hundred feet below. The entrance to the Citadel also looked eastward, but was delved in the heart of the rock; thence a long lamp-lit slope ran up to the seventh gate. Thus men reached at last the High Court, and the Place of the Fountain before the feet of the White Tower: tall and shapely, fifty fathoms from its base to the pinnacle, where the banner of the Stewards floated a thousand feet above the plain.

— The Lord of the Rings, book 5, ch. 1 "Minas Tirith"

Timeline (Note: Tolkien 1955, Appendix B "The Second Age" and "The Third Age")
Date	Event
c. S.A. 3400	Minas Tirith founded
T.A. 2050	Eärnur, last King of Gondor, dies; Stewards rule in his stead
2685–2698	Ecthelion rebuilds the White Tower
3018–19	War of the Ring
3019, 10 March	Mordor attacks Gondor
3019, 15 March	Battle of the Pelennor Fields
3019, 1 May	Aragorn crowned King of Arnor and Gondor

Minas Tirith (Sindarin: "Tower of Guard") was the capital of Gondor at the end of the Third Age of Middle-earth. It lay at the eastern end of the White Mountains, built around a shoulder of Mount Mindolluin. The city is sometimes called "the White Tower", a synecdoche for the city's most prominent building in its Citadel, the seat of the city's administration. The head of government is the Lord of the City, a role fulfilled by the Stewards of Gondor. Other officials included the Warden of the Houses of Healing and the Warden of the Keys. The Warden of the Keys was in charge of the city's security, especially its gates, and the safe-keeping of its treasury, notably the Crown of Gondor; he had command of the city when it was besieged by the forces of Mordor. (Note: Tolkien 1955, book 5 ch. 8 "The Houses of Healing")

Minas Tirith had seven walls: each wall held a gate, and for strength of defence each gate faced a different direction from the next, facing alternately somewhat north or south. Each level was about 100 ft (30 m) above the one below it, and each surrounded by a high stone wall coloured white, with the exception of the wall of the First Circle (the lowest level), which was black, built of the same material used for Orthanc. This outer wall was also the tallest, longest and strongest of the city's seven walls; it was vulnerable only to earthquakes capable of rending the ground where it stood. (Note: Tolkien 1955, book 5, ch. 4 "The Siege of Gondor") The Great Gate of Minas Tirith, constructed of iron and steel and guarded by stone towers and bastions, was the main gate in the first or outer wall of the city. In front of the Great Gate was a large paved area called the Gateway. The main roads to Minas Tirith met here: the North-way that became the Great West Road to Rohan; the South Road to the southern provinces of Gondor; and the road to Osgiliath, which lay to the north-east of Minas Tirith. Except for the high saddle of rock which joined the west of the hill to Mindolluin, the city was surrounded by the Pelennor, an area of farmlands. (Note: Tolkien 1955 book 5 ch. 1 "Minas Tirith")

The city's main street zigzagged up the eastern hill-face and through each of the gates and the central spur of rock. It led to the Citadel through the Seventh Gate on its eastern part. The White Tower, at the city's highest level with a commanding view of the lower vales of Anduin, stood in the Citadel, 700 feet above the surrounding plains, protected by the seventh and innermost wall atop the spur. Originally constructed by a king of yore, it is also known as the Tower of Ecthelion, the Steward of Gondor who had it rebuilt. The seat of the rulers of Gondor, the Kings and the Stewards, the tower stood 300 ft (91 m) tall, so that its pinnacle was some one thousand feet (300 m) above the plain. The main doors of the tower faced east, onto the Court of the Fountain. Inside was the Tower Hall, the great throne room where the Kings (or Stewards) held court. The Seeing-stone of Minas Tirith, used by Denethor in The Return of the King, rested in a secret chamber at the top of the Tower. There was a buttery of the Guards of the Citadel in the basement of the tower. Behind the tower, reached from the sixth level, was a saddle leading to the Hallows or necropolis of the Kings and Stewards, with its street of tombs, Rath Dínen.

== Identifications with historical or mythical cities ==
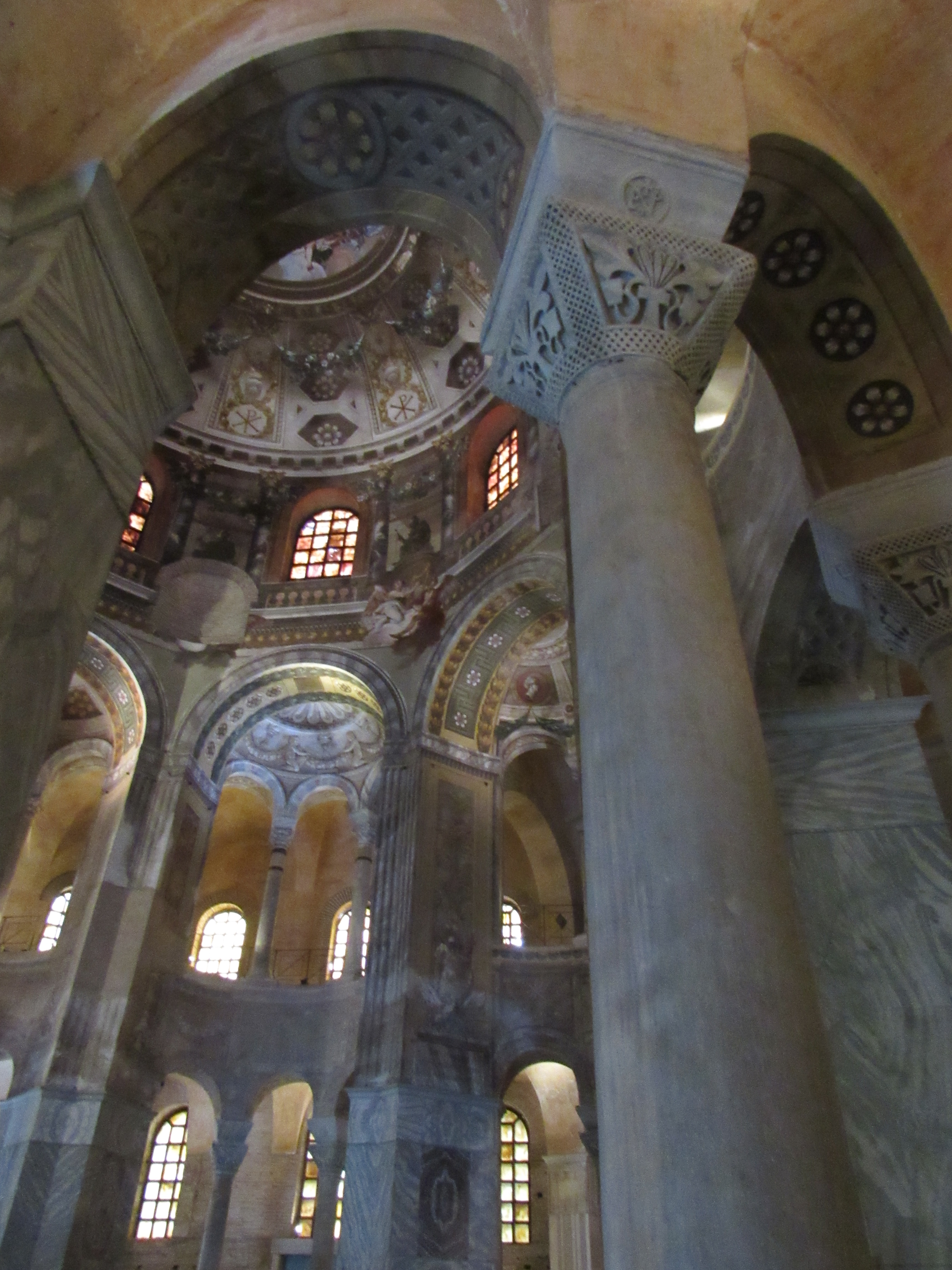
Minas Tirith's towering stone hall of Ecthelion has been compared to Ravenna's 6th century Basilica of San Vitale.

Tolkien was influenced by many authors when constructing Middle-earth, including several classical sources. Scholars, following various leads in Tolkien's fantasy and letters, have identified Minas Tirith with several different historical or mythical cities, including Troy, Rome, Ravenna, and Constantinople.

=== Troy ===
In a letter, Tolkien stated that Minas Tirith, some "600 miles south [of the village of Hobbiton in the Shire], is at about the latitude of Florence. The Mouths of Anduin and the ancient city of Pelargir [in the south of Gondor] are at about the latitude of ancient Troy." (Note: Carpenter 2023, #376 to Charlotte and Denis Plimmer, 8 February 1967) Michael Livingston comments in Mythlore that Minas Tirith resembled Troy in having "impregnable walls", and in being subjected to a siege that seemed to threaten civilisation.

Further, in Livingston's opinion, the Steward Denethor's two sons, Boromir and Faramir, play the roles of Hector in Homer's Iliad, "the heroic example of martial, mortal man", and of Paris, the younger brother "little loved by [his father]", in "asterisk" form, as they might have been. Livingston notes that Paris, like Faramir, is seriously wounded by a "deadly dart"; he is dragged back into Troy, just as Faramir is carried to Minas Tirith's Houses of Healing. Both men suffer burning fevers. Paris can't be saved; Faramir can. Paris's body is burned on a pyre; his abandoned wife Oenone burns herself to death with him. Denethor has himself burned alive on a pyre, and he tries to have Faramir burned with him, but is foiled in this.

=== Ravenna ===
Tolkien's map-notes for the illustrator Pauline Baynes indicate that Minas Tirith had the latitude of Ravenna, an Italian city on the Adriatic Sea, though it lay "900 miles east of Hobbiton more near Belgrade". The Tolkien scholar Judy Ann Ford writes that there is an architectural connection with Ravenna in Pippin's description of the great hall of Denethor, which in her view suggests a Germanic myth of a restored Roman Empire.

=== Ancient Rome ===
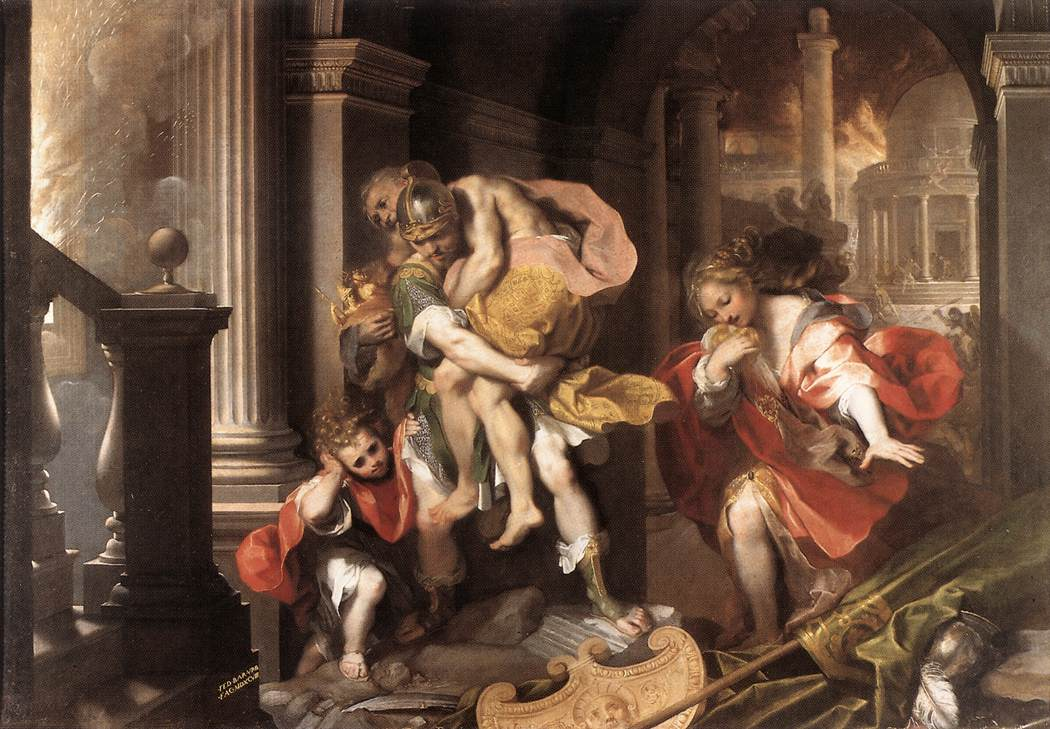
Aeneas escaped the ruin of Troy to become a hero of Rome, as Elendil escaped Númenor to found Minas Tirith. Painting by Federico Barocci, 1598

Sandra Ballif Straubhaar states in The J. R. R. Tolkien Encyclopedia that "the most striking similarities" are with ancient Rome. She identifies several parallels: Aeneas, from Troy, and Elendil, from Númenor, both survive the destruction of their home countries; the brothers Romulus and Remus found Rome, while the brothers Isildur and Anárion found the Númenórean kingdoms of Gondor and Arnor in Middle-earth; and both Gondor and Rome experienced centuries of "decadence and decline".

Judy Ann Ford adds in Tolkien Studies that Minas Tirith was entirely built of stone, and "the only culture within [the Anglo-Saxons'] historical memory that had made places like Minas Tirith was the Roman Empire." Tolkien intended to create a mythology for England, so that while the Third Age is ostensibly many thousands of years ago, much of the setting is medieval. She comments that Tolkien's account echoes the decline and fall of Rome, but "with a happy ending", as it "somehow withstood the onslaught of armies from the east, and ... was restored to glory." She finds multiple likenesses between Minas Tirith and Rome.

Judy Ann Ford's reasons for identifying Minas Tirith with Rome
Story element	Ancient Rome	Gondor
Capital moved under threat	From Rome to Ravenna in 402 AD	From Osgiliath to Minas Tirith
Layout of the city	Walled city, built of stone	Seven walls of indomitable stone
Architecture	Ravenna's tall Basilica of San Vitale	The towering stone Hall of Ecthelion
Southern rivals who use war-elephants	Carthaginians	Haradrim
Devastating disease outbreak	Antonine Plague	Great Plague
Language becomes a lingua franca	Latin	Westron

=== Constantinople ===
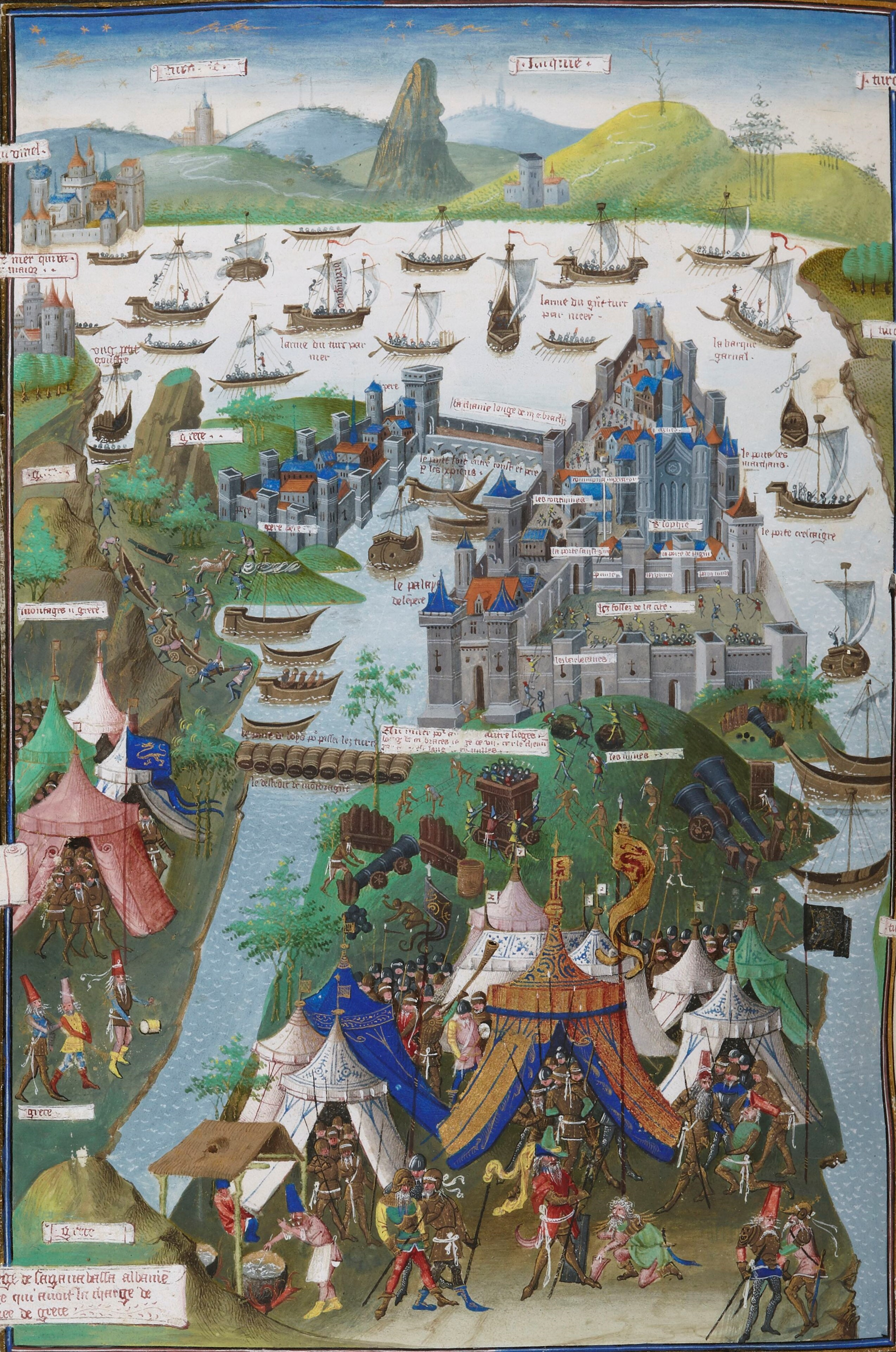
Tolkien called Minas Tirith a "Byzantine City": that empire's capital was Constantinople (shown).

In a 1951 letter, Tolkien wrote of "the Byzantine City of Minas Tirith", thus associating Gondor's capital with Constantinople, the capital of the Byzantine Empire. The classical scholar Miryam Librán-Moreno writes that Tolkien drew heavily on the history of the Byzantine Empire, and its struggle with the Goths and Langobards. The Byzantine Empire and Gondor were both, in Librán-Moreno's view, only echoes of older states (the Roman Empire and the unified kingdom of Elendil), yet each proved to be stronger than their sister-kingdoms (the Western Roman Empire and Arnor, respectively). Both realms were threatened by powerful eastern and southern enemies: the Byzantines by the Sassanid Persians and the Muslim armies of the Arabs and the Turks, as well as the Langobards and Goths; Gondor by the Easterlings, the Haradrim, and the hordes of Sauron. Both realms, as commentators including Librán-Moreno and Jefferson P. Swycaffer have observed, were in decline at the time of a final, all-out siege from the East; however, Minas Tirith survived the siege whereas Constantinople did not. Swycaffer adds that Constantinople was famed for the strength of its defences, with its concentric walls.

Miryam Librán-Moreno's reasons for identifying Minas Tirith with Constantinople
Situation	Byzantine Empire	Gondor
Older state echoed	Roman Empire	Elendil's unified kingdom of Gondor and Arnor
Weaker sister kingdom	Western Roman Empire	Arnor, the Northern kingdom
Powerful enemies to East and South	Persians, Arabs, Ottoman Turks	Easterlings, Haradrim, Mordor
Final siege from the East	Constantinople falls	Battle of the Pelennor Fields is won

== Analysis ==
=== The White Tree ===
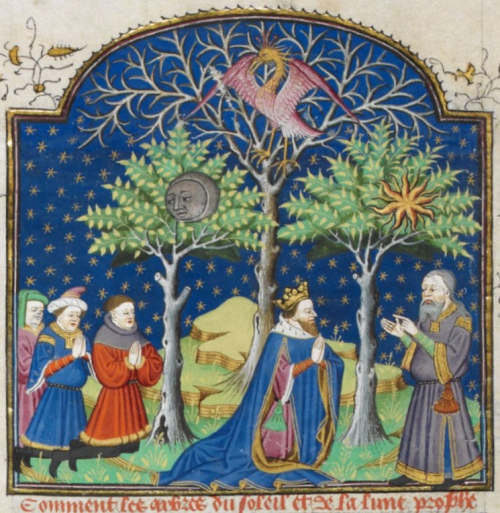
The lifeless White Tree of Gondor has been compared to the Dry Tree (pictured) of medieval legend. Manuscript illustration dated 1444 of the Dry Tree (centre) with the Phoenix, flanked by the Trees of the Sun and the Moon. Both the Dry Tree and the Phoenix are symbols of resurrection and new life. Rouen 1444-1445

Tolkien stated that within the Court of the Fountain at the heart of Minas Tirith stood the White Tree, the symbol of Gondor. It was dry and dead throughout the centuries that Gondor was ruled by the Stewards; Aragorn brought a young living sapling of the White Tree into the city on his return as King, symbolising the rebirth of the monarchy.

Tolkien's biographer John Garth writes that the White Tree has been likened to the Dry Tree of the 14th century Travels of Sir John Mandeville. The tale runs that the Dry Tree has been dry since the crucifixion of Christ, but that it will flower afresh when "a prince of the west side of the world should sing a mass beneath it".

=== Contrast with Gondolin ===
Lisa Anne Mende, in Mythlore, contrasts the happy eucatastrophes which rescue Minas Tirith in The Lord of the Rings – the last-minute arrivals of the Riders of Rohan, and then of Aragorn in the enemy's ships – with the unmitigated disasters of the Fall of Gondolin and the other Elvish cities of Beleriand in The Silmarillion. She notes Tolkien's Christianity, which influenced Middle-earth, and describes the "first victory of Evil" in The Silmarillion as "resolved into the harmony of the victory of Good" in The Lord of the Rings. In The Silmarillion, the Dark Lord Melkor greatly influences the story, and the development of Middle-earth, whereas in The Lord of the Rings, Melkor's acolyte, the Dark Lord Sauron is almost successful but fails in his plans.

== Adaptations ==
=== Film ===
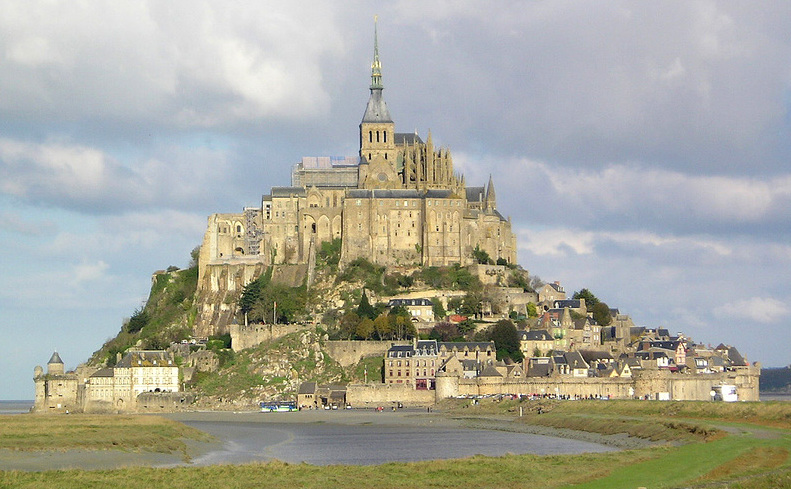
In Peter Jackson's film The Lord of the Rings: The Return of the King, Minas Tirith was modelled on Normandy's Mont Saint-Michel.

In Peter Jackson's film adaptation of The Lord of the Rings, Minas Tirith was according to the concept designer Alan Lee given an ancient appearance reminiscent of Byzantium or ancient Rome. However, the appearance and structure of the city was based upon the inhabited tidal island and abbey of Mont Saint-Michel, France. In the films, the towers of the city, designed by Lee, are equipped with trebuchets. The film critic Roger Ebert called the films' interpretation of Minas Tirith a "spectacular achievement", and compared it to the Emerald City from The Wizard of Oz. He praised the filmmakers' ability to blend digital and real sets.

=== Games ===
The setting of Minas Tirith has appeared in video game adaptations of The Lord of the Rings, such as the 2003 video game The Lord of the Rings: The Return of the King where it is directly modelled on Jackson's film adaptation.

=== Art ===
Ted Nasmith's painting of Gandalf riding to Minas Tirith has been described as the most fully rendered and realistic image of the city, free of the silliness of much fantasy art.

Christopher Tuthill, in A Companion to J. R. R. Tolkien, evaluates the paintings of Minas Tirith made by the major Tolkien illustrators Alan Lee, John Howe (both of whom worked as concept designers for Peter Jackson's film trilogy), Jef Murray, and Ted Nasmith. Tuthill writes that it has become "hard to imagine" Middle-earth "without the many sub-creators who have worked within it", noting that the "dreaded effects" of what Tolkien called "silliness and morbidity" of much fantasy art in his time "are nowhere in evidence" in these artists' work. In Tuthill's view, the most "fully rendered and realistic-looking" painting is Nasmith's Gandalf Rides to Minas Tirith, with a "wholly convincing city" in the background, majestic as the Wizard gallops towards it in the dawn light. He notes that Nasmith uses his architectural rendering skill to provide a detailed view of the whole city. He quotes Nasmith as writing that he studied what Tolkien said, such as likening Gondor to the culture of ancient Egypt. Tuthill compares Howe's and Murray's versions of the same scene; Howe shows only a corner of the city, but vividly captures the movement of the horse and the rider's flying robes, with a strong interplay of light and dark, the white horse against the dusky rocks. Murray similarly uses strong contrast, with the white city against dark clouds overhead, but using "flat bold lines and a deep blue hue", while Howe's city more closely resembles a traditional castle of fairytales with pennants on every pinnacle, in Fauvist style. Lee chooses instead to look within Minas Tirith, showing "the same glimmering spires and white stone", a guard standing in the foreground in place of Gandalf and his horse; his painting gives a feeling of "how massive the city is", with close attention to the late Romanesque or early Gothic architectural detail and perspective.

== Sources ==
- Hammond, Wayne G.; Scull, Christina (1995). J.R.R. Tolkien: Artist and Illustrator. London: HarperCollins Publishers. ISBN 978-0-261-10322-1.
- Carpenter, Humphrey, ed. (2023) [1981]. The Letters of J. R. R. Tolkien: Revised and Expanded Edition. New York: HarperCollins. ISBN 978-0-35-865298-4.
- Fonstad, Karen Wynn (1991). The Atlas of Middle-earth. Boston: Houghton Mifflin Harcourt. ISBN 0-618-12699-6.
- Garth, John (2020). The Worlds of J.R.R. Tolkien: The Places that Inspired Middle-earth. Frances Lincoln Publishers & Princeton University Press. ISBN 978-0-7112-4127-5.
- Hammond, Wayne G.; Scull, Christina (2005). The Lord of the Rings: A Reader's Companion. London: HarperCollins. ISBN 0-00-720907-X.
- Straubhaar, Sandra Ballif (2007). "Gondor". In Drout, Michael D. C. (ed.). The J. R. R. Tolkien Encyclopedia: Scholarship and Critical Assessment. Routledge. pp. 248–249. ISBN 978-0-415-96942-0.
- Tolkien, J. R. R. (1955). The Return of the King. The Lord of the Rings. Boston: Houghton Mifflin. OCLC 519647821.
