= The Council of Elrond =

Chapter of The Lord of the Rings

"The Council of Elrond" is the second chapter of Book 2 of J. R. R. Tolkien's bestselling fantasy work, The Lord of the Rings, which was published in 1954–1955. It is the longest chapter in that book at some 15,000 words, and critical for explaining the power and threat of the One Ring, for introducing the final members of the Company of the Ring, and for defining the planned quest to destroy it. Contrary to the maxim "Show, don't tell", the chapter consists mainly of people talking; the action is, as in an earlier chapter "The Shadow of the Past", narrated, largely by the Wizard Gandalf, in flashback. The chapter parallels the far simpler Beorn chapter in The Hobbit, which similarly presents a culture-clash of modern (mediated by the hobbit) with ancient (the heroic Beorn). The Tolkien scholar Tom Shippey calls the chapter "a largely unappreciated tour de force". The Episcopal priest Fleming Rutledge writes that the chapter brings the hidden narrative of Christianity in The Lord of the Rings close to the surface.

Peter Jackson, in his Lord of the Rings film trilogy, shortens the Council scene by moving the history of the Ring to a voiced-over prologue. Scholars have noted that he then transforms the calmly reflective meeting into one that breaks up into a heated argument, and makes Aragorn the focus, not Frodo; but that all the same, Jackson portrays the moment when Frodo chooses to undertake the quest in a vivid and effective way.

== Context ==
=== History ===
The philologist and University of Oxford professor J. R. R. Tolkien had been working on his legendarium, the complex narratives that became The Silmarillion, for some 20 years, and had in 1937 published the well-received children's book The Hobbit. His publishers, Allen & Unwin, asked him for a follow-up book. The first chapter set out in a light-hearted style much like that of The Hobbit, with a story of Bilbo Baggins's speech at his birthday party. As he stated, the tale "grew in the telling", becoming the epic fantasy The Lord of the Rings, which was published in 1954–55.

=== In-universe ===
Earlier in The Fellowship of the Ring, Tolkien tells how Bilbo leaves the Shire suddenly, giving his ring to Frodo Baggins. (Note: Tolkien 1954a, book 1, ch. 1: "A Long-expected Party") Seventeen years later, the Wizard Gandalf tells Frodo that it is the One Ring lost by the Dark Lord Sauron long ago, and counsels him to take it away from the Shire. (Note: Tolkien 1954a, book 1, ch. 2: "The Shadow of the Past") Frodo sets out on foot with some of his friends. They are pursued by mysterious Black Riders, but manage to reach the village of Bree, where they meet a Ranger named Strider. (Note: Tolkien 1954a, book 1, chs. 3–9) He leads them through the wilderness to the Elven sanctuary of Rivendell. (Note: Tolkien 1954a, book 1, chs. 10–11)

== Summary ==
Participants in the Council of Elrond, on map of the northwest of Middle-earth. All come to seek advice; Elrond tells them he summoned them. (Note: Tolkien 1954a, book 2, ch. 2: "The Council of Elrond".) All locations are diagrammatic.

The half-elven Master of Rivendell, Elrond, tells the representatives of all the Free Peoples that although they all had seemingly come for their own reasons, he had summoned them to speak for their people about the Ring and the danger from Sauron. The Dwarf Glóin tells that a messenger from Sauron had asked his king, Dáin II Ironfoot, for news of Bilbo and his ring, promising three Dwarf-Rings in return. Dáin, suspicious, had sent Glóin and his son Gimli to Rivendell for advice.

Boromir, son of the Steward of Gondor, narrates a dream that both he and his brother Faramir had had, that darkness in the east had been answered by a voice from the west, reciting

Seek for the Sword that was broken;
In Imladris it dwells.
There shall be counsels taken
Stronger than Morgul-spells.
There shall be shown a token
That Doom is near at hand.
For Isildur's Bane shall waken,
And the Halfling forth shall stand.

At this, Strider displays his broken sword, Narsil, and reveals that he is Aragorn, the heir of Isildur. In the battle that ended the Second Age, Isildur had used the broken sword to cut the One Ring from Sauron's hand, but refused to destroy it, claiming it for himself. The Ring had been lost when Isildur was killed; it was his bane, the thing that caused his death.

Elrond summons Frodo to show the Ring; Boromir is astonished it should have come to such an unlikely recipient. Bilbo tells how the Ring came into his possession, after his meeting with Gollum, described in The Hobbit. Gandalf explains how the Ring had lengthened Gollum's life, how he had found a scroll written by Isildur which told how to identify the ring by its "fiery letters", and that he and Frodo had seen these in Frodo's home.

Aragorn tells of his long search for Gollum, that he finally captured him and gave him to Thranduil's Elves in Mirkwood to hold in safety. At this, Thranduil's son Legolas tells of Gollum's escape. Gandalf tells the shocked meeting that Gollum may yet have a part to play. Gandalf reports further bad news: that the chief Wizard, Saruman, has betrayed them and is now working to become a power in his own right. Gandalf was captured by Saruman, so he had been unable to meet Frodo as he had promised. He escaped when Gwaihir, Lord of the Eagles, rescued him.

The Council debates what to do with the Ring, but all the proposals are seen not to work. Elrond says that the Ring must be destroyed, and that the only way is to bring it to the fire of Mount Doom in Mordor, where it was forged. Frodo takes this task upon himself. Samwise Gamgee, who had been listening, though he had not been invited, asks if Frodo would have to go alone. Elrond tells Sam that he can go with his master.

== Structure ==
Outline structure
- The council and its members
  - Dwarf narrative: Glóin on Sauron's messenger's false promises, Dáin's reply
  - Elrond's narrative: history of the Ring
  - Gondor narrative: Boromir and his dream
  - Aragorn's narrative: the Sword that was Broken; heir of Isildur
  - Frodo displays the Ring; Boromir's reaction
  - Gandalf's narrative (part)
    - Hobbits' narratives: Bilbo and Frodo
    - Proofs of the One Ring
    - The hunt for Gollum, his capture
  - Elf narrative: Legolas: Gollum's escape
  - Gandalf's narrative (part)
    - Radagast, Saruman a traitor, Orthanc trap, escape with Gwaihir
    - Shadowfax, travel from Rohan to Bree to Rivendell
  - Debate on options
    - Tom Bombadil no use, the sea no use, the fires of Mount Doom
    - The Ring cannot be used as a weapon
    - Bilbo's offer refused
    - Frodo's offer accepted
- Hobbit Sam intrudes

The Tolkien scholar Tom Shippey, in a passage cited at length by Wayne Hammond and Christina Scull, calls the chapter "a largely unappreciated tour de force, whose success may be gauged by the fact that few pause to recognize its complexity." Shippey writes that it boldly ignores many rules of writing, being long at 15,000 words, but "in it nothing happens: it consists entirely of people talking". Further, there are many speakers: twelve of them present in the meeting, and another seven quoted in the longest speech, Gandalf's, which, Shippey notes, takes up half the chapter. In addition, the chapter's account of its complex committee meeting "could very easily have disintegrated, lost its way, or simply become too boring to follow". It did not do so, in Shippey's view, because Tolkien had an "extremely firm grasp of the history [of Middle-earth]", and because he had an "unusual ability to suggest cultural variation by differences in mode of speech". Shippey mentions another distinctive structural feature of the chapter. The whole two-book volume is narrated as a single strand with Frodo as the protagonist, except for the flashback narratives within "The Shadow of the Past" and "The Council of Elrond".

Kate Nepveu, writing for Tor.com, calls the chapter enormous but one of her favourites, noting that it "parallels and revises" "The Shadow of the Past", both chapters mixing summary and quoted dialogue. The Tolkien scholar Verlyn Flieger adds that the two chapters are similar in that "the past must be recapitulated by Gandalf or Elrond [in their respective flashback sections] in order to explain the present".

== Themes ==
=== Cultural depth ===
Shippey writes that the Council of Elrond is the occasion for Tolkien to introduce the diversity of cultures in his story, a fantasy of "unusual cultural depth". It serves, Shippey writes, as a jumping-off point for each character, and arguably also for Tolkien "since after that he was no longer writing his way through landscapes he had travelled before [in The Hobbit]". He states that the equivalent point in The Hobbit was the house of Beorn, which like the house of Elrond was where the ancient, heroic world suddenly collided with and overcame the practical modern world: though the Council of Elrond is many times more complicated than the Beorn chapter. Much of that complexity is in Gandalf's lengthy monologue; in it, Tolkien embeds samples of the speech of people of several races, starting with Sam's father, old Gaffer Gamgee, who speaks "many words and few to the point". Gaffer Gamgee, grumblingly unprepared for the changes that are coming, "functions as a kind of base-line of normality – and, concomitantly, of emptiness". Gandalf introduces a quite different culture and voice in Saruman, who "talks like a politician", using empty words like "real change" while speaking of "many of the things the modern world has learnt to dread most: the ditching of allies, the subordination of means to ends, the 'conscious acceptance of guilt in the necessary murder'". Shippey comments that any of the speeches in the Council "would bear similar analysis", the richness of the linguistic modes making the chapter's "'information content' ... very high".

=== Good and evil ===
Tolkien wrote in an unsent letter to W. H. Auden that whereas a ruler like Denethor was political, favouring his country (Gondor) "against the rest" and in the process moving towards tyranny, the Council of Elrond was not political: Elrond and the Elves acted against their own interest "in pursuit of a 'humane' duty". They knew that they were "destroy[ing] their own polity" by destroying the Ring, "an inevitable result of victory". (Note: Carpenter 2023, letter #183, Notes on W. H. Auden's review of The Return of the King)

The scholar of English literature Paul Kocher writes that Elrond has not changed his opinion of the Ring since the Second Age, when, in vain, he urged Isildur to destroy it in the fires of Mount Doom while he had the chance. He notes that Elrond's statement that he fears to take the Ring even to hide it, and will not take it to wield it, shows that Elves are capable of evil. Kocher observes, too, that Elrond agrees to Frodo's offer to undertake the quest "arises from his [Elrond's] faith that a higher providence is guiding the deliberations of the Council".

=== Establishing tensions ===
Kocher and Shippey both note that Aragorn and Boromir joust verbally in the Council, as Aragorn steadily but tactfully asserts his position, implying that he is heir to the throne of Gondor. This sets up the dynamic between the characters, with in Shippey's words "Aragorn's language deceptively modern, even easy-going on occasion, but with greater range than Boromir's slightly wooden magniloquence". Shippey writes that the words Aragorn uses to let Boromir have the last word are at once perfectly modern: "we will put it [his ability to live up to his mighty ancient sword] to the test one day", and an echo of the words of Ælfwine, a hero of the Old English poem The Battle of Maldon. The overall effect of all the different modes of speech is, in Shippey's view, to convey the multiplicity of ways of being or "'life-styles' of Middle-earth the soldier for its occasional contrasts with modernity".

=== Hidden Christianity ===
The Episcopal priest and Tolkien scholar Fleming Rutledge writes that the chapter brings "the deep narrative" of Christianity in The Lord of the Rings almost explicitly to the surface, stating that it is "replete with theological meaning". She notes that the Dwarf-king Dáin's rejection of the offer of what he most desired, the Dwarf-Rings, was "a measure of his heroism", resisting temptation in an "almost unbelievably noble" way. She describes it as "hard to overestimate the importance of the conversation" between Aragorn, Legolas, and Gandalf about Gollum's escape from the Elves. In her view, it reveals Tolkien's "deep apocalyptic narrative" about the unseen divine will in the battle between good and evil, in particular in Gandalf's remark that Gollum "may play a part yet that neither he nor Sauron has foreseen". She is equally struck by the discussion between Elrond and Gandalf about whether they personally will accept the Ring and the nature of evil, emphasising Elrond's remark that "as long as it is in the world it will be a danger even to the Wise. For nothing is evil in the beginning. Even Sauron was not so".

== In film ==
Peter Jackson, in his Lord of the Rings film trilogy, chose to transform the structure of Tolkien's chapter, moving Sauron's forging of the Ring in the Second Age, his overthrow by an alliance of Elves and Men, and the taking of the Ring by Isildur to a dramatic film prologue, narrated with voice-over. This resolves a major problem for the film-maker in the narrative, namely that Tolkien tells much of the history through "talking heads", reflecting long after the events on what they meant, and violating the basic "show, don't tell" principle of film. The council scene in Jackson's 2001 film The Fellowship of the Ring is thus much shorter, and with far less speech, than Tolkien's chapter.

Peter Jackson's portrayal of the Council of Elrond in his 2001 film The Fellowship of the Ring is visually effective but brief and noisy, in contrast to Tolkien's quietly reflective meeting.

The Tolkien scholar Daniel Timmons, mainly critical of Jackson's interpretation, writes that Jackson alters the moment when Frodo accepts the quest to destroy the Ring, "but this time elevates Frodo to the stature that Tolkien has portrayed throughout his book". Timmons notes that Jackson favours the "frenetic moment, the council arguing, over Tolkien's [approach], the council in quiet reflection". He writes that the scene succeeds in "vividly and effectively" displaying Frodo's "momentous decision. We see Frodo's inner struggle, his doubts, his fears, balanced against his sense that he is the right one for the task; he recognizes that his humble and non-aggressive nature make him the best available person to bear this burden. Alas, would that many more such moments existed in Jackson's film."

The scholar of film Judith Kollmann notes that the chapter is the longest in that book, and "a major nexus" that explains the power and threat of the One Ring, introduces the final members of the Fellowship of the Ring, and defines the planned quest to destroy it. She describes Tolkien's version as working systematically through the agenda, "a council conducted with dignity and in peace". She writes that in Jackson's film, "virtually everything is changed": Frodo is healed but his recovery is not celebrated; Frodo and Sam have "bags packed and waiting", eager to return to the Shire; Elrond and Gandalf are "almost ... conspiratorial"; the Council is "framed, not by hobbits, but by Aragorn" who meets Boromir before the Council, and Arwen after it. Thus, she writes, Jackson has shifted the emphasis from Frodo to Aragorn as hero.

== See also ==
- "The Scouring of the Shire" – Book chapter

== Sources ==
- Carpenter, Humphrey (1978) [1977]. J. R. R. Tolkien: A Biography. G. Allen & Unwin. ISBN 978-0-04-928039-7.
- Carpenter, Humphrey, ed. (2023) [1981]. The Letters of J. R. R. Tolkien: Revised and Expanded Edition. New York: HarperCollins. ISBN 978-0-35-865298-4.
- Croft, Janet Brennan, ed. (2004). Tolkien on Film: Essays on Peter Jackson's 'The Lord of the Rings'. Mythopoeic Press. ISBN 978-1887726092.
- Flieger, Verlyn (2001) [1997]. A Question of Time: J.R.R. Tolkien's Road to Faërie. Kent State University Press. ISBN 978-0-87338-699-9.
- Hammond, Wayne G.; Scull, Christina (2005). The Lord of the Rings: A Reader's Companion. HarperCollins. pp. 74–91. ISBN 978-0-007-20907-1.
- Kocher, Paul (1974) [1972]. Master of Middle-earth: The Achievement of J.R.R. Tolkien. Penguin Books. ISBN 978-0140038774.
- Nepveu, Kate (27 March 2009). "LotR re-read: Fellowship II.2, 'The Council of Elrond'". Tor.com.
- Rutledge, Fleming (2004). The Battle for Middle-earth: Tolkien's Divine Design in The Lord of the Rings. William B. Eerdmans Publishing Company. ISBN 978-0-80282-497-4.
- Shippey, Tom (2001). J. R. R. Tolkien: Author of the Century. HarperCollins. ISBN 978-0261-10401-3.
- Shippey, Tom (2005) [1982]. The Road to Middle-Earth: How J. R. R. Tolkien Created a New Mythology (Third ed.). HarperCollins. ISBN 978-0-261-10275-0.
- Timmons, Daniel (2013) [2007]. "Jackson, Peter". In Drout, Michael D. C. (ed.). The J. R. R. Tolkien Encyclopedia. Routledge. pp. 303–310. ISBN 978-0-415-86511-1.
- Tolkien, J. R. R. (1954a). The Fellowship of the Ring. The Lord of the Rings. Boston: Houghton Mifflin. OCLC 9552942.
