= The Shadow of the Past =

Chapter of The Lord of the Rings

"The Shadow of the Past" is the second chapter of J. R. R. Tolkien's fantasy work, The Lord of the Rings, published in 1954–1955. Tolkien called it "the crucial chapter"; the Tolkien scholar Tom Shippey labelled it "the vital chapter". This is because it represents both the moment that Tolkien devised the central plot of the book, and the point in the story where the protagonist, Frodo Baggins, and the reader realise that there will be a quest to destroy the One Ring. A sketch of the chapter was among the first parts of the book to be written, early in 1938; later that year, it was one of three chapters of the book that Tolkien drafted. In 1944, he returned to the chapter, adding descriptions of Gollum, the Ring, and the hunt for Gollum.

The chapter changes the book's tone from the first chapter's light-hearted hobbit partying. It introduces major themes of the book, including a sense of the depth of time behind unfolding events, the power of the Ring, and the inter-related questions of providence, free will, and predestination.

Peter Jackson, in his Lord of the Rings film trilogy, splits up Gandalf's description of the Ring's history to Frodo and compresses other parts of his talk, changing the way Frodo is presented.

== History ==
=== Context ===
The philologist and University of Oxford professor J. R. R. Tolkien had been working on his legendarium, the complex narratives that became The Silmarillion, for some 20 years, and had in 1937 published the well-received children's book The Hobbit. His publishers, George Allen & Unwin, asked him for a follow-up book. Over the Christmas of 1937, Tolkien began to write, without a clear idea where the story would lead, or indeed whether the audience would be children or adults. The first chapter set out in a style much like that of The Hobbit, with a story of Bilbo Baggins's speech at his birthday party. As he stated, the tale "grew in the telling", becoming the epic fantasy The Lord of the Rings, which was published in 1954–55.

=== Further Hobbit-style adventures ===
Tolkien's biographer, Humphrey Carpenter, writes that at the end of 1937, Tolkien wrote the first chapter of The Lord of the Rings, "A Long-Expected Party", but "had as yet no clear idea of what the new story was going to be about". A sketch of "The Shadow of the Past" soon followed; it was among the first parts of the book to be written, early in 1938.

The scholar Christina Scull notes that Tolkien's words, "I wrote and tore up and rewrote most of it a good many times", applies as much to the start of The Lord of the Rings as to the section of book 4 to which he applied it. By beginning the work with a "long-expected" party, he was consciously echoing the "unexpected party" that began The Hobbit. She suggests that he was clearly planning that the hero – whether Bilbo, or in draft variants his son or his adopted young cousin Bingo – would throw the party and then set off on The Hobbit-style adventures. In February 1938 he wrote to his publisher that as he had not intended to write a sequel, he feared "I squandered all my favourite 'motifs' and characters on the original 'Hobbit'." (Note: Carpenter 2023, #23 to C. A. Furth of Allen & Unwin, 17 February 1938)

=== "The crucial chapter" ===
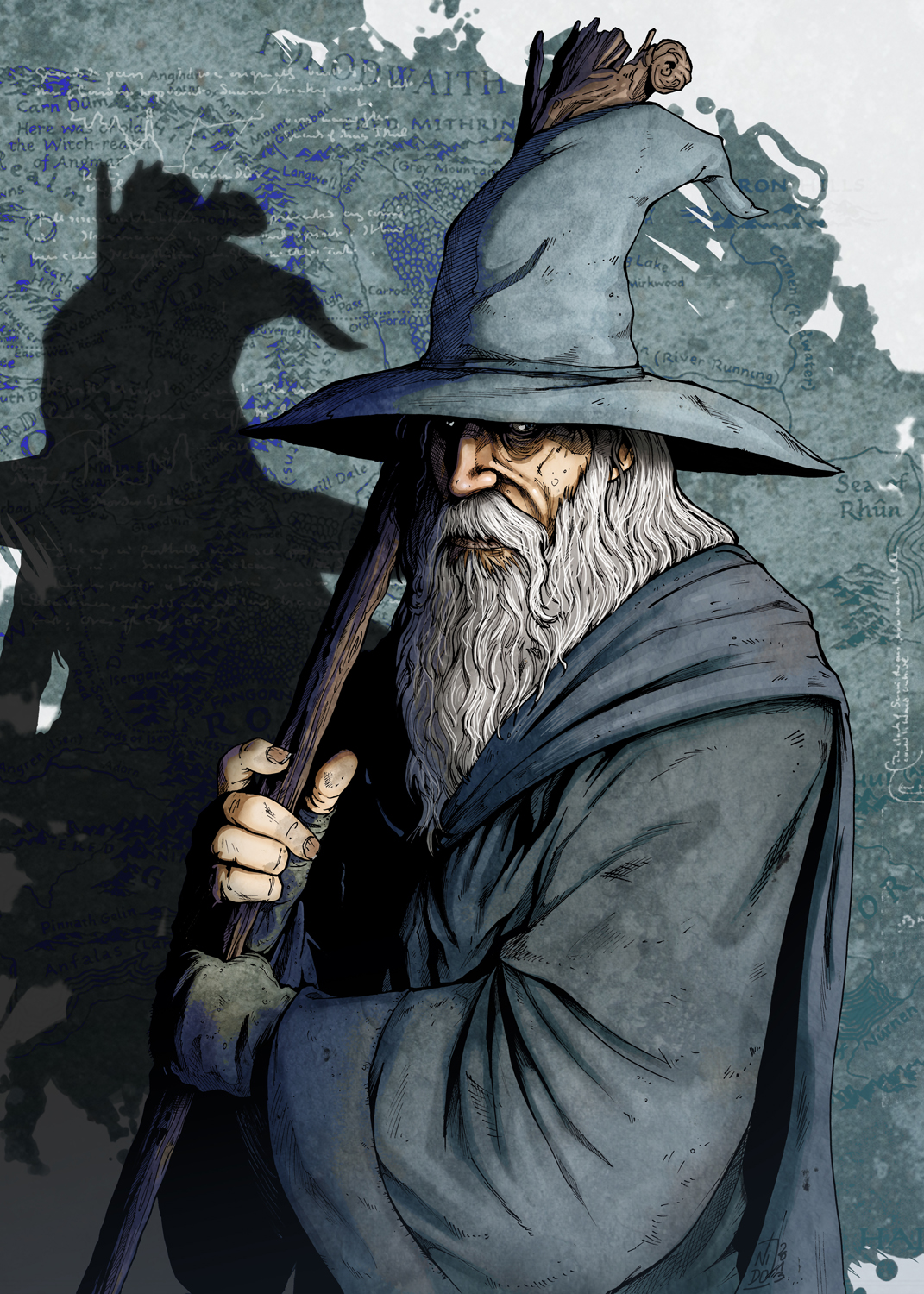
The wandering Wizard Gandalf visits Frodo in his home in the Shire, and tells him what he has learnt of the Ring on his travels.

Tolkien told his publisher that "stories tend to get out of hand, and this has taken an unpremeditated turn"; a Black Rider, of unknown provenance, had appeared, searching intently for the Hobbits. (Note: Tolkien 1988, chapter 2, "From Hobbiton to the Woody End". The encounter with the Black Rider ultimately became part of the third chapter, "Three is Company") But progress on the story stalled until the summer of 1938. Tolkien then had the Elf Gildor explain that the Ring had been made by the Necromancer, who wanted to find it; and the Black Riders were the Ringwraiths. He was then able to draft a dialogue between the Hobbit and Gandalf about how the Ring must be destroyed. Suddenly the ideas began to flow. It was a critical section, as it represents both the moment that Tolkien devised the central plot of the whole book, and the point in the story where the protagonist, Frodo Baggins, and the reader realize that there will be a quest to destroy the Ring. The manuscripts illustrating the slow development of Tolkien's ideas are documented by Tolkien's son Christopher in The Return of the Shadow. (Note: Tolkien 1988, chapter 3, "Of Gollum and the Ring") Tolkien later described "The Shadow of the Past" as "the crucial chapter". The Tolkien scholar Tom Shippey concurred, labelling it "the vital chapter", as it established the central plot of the book. In particular, it demonstrated that the Ring was immeasurably powerful and unalterably evil, so that its destruction was the only viable choice, however dangerous that might be.

Tolkien sent drafts of three chapters to his publisher for comment. They were read by the 12-year-old Rayner Unwin, who had given a favourable opinion of The Hobbit to his father some years earlier; this time he reported that he had enjoyed the material, but that there was "too much Hobbit talk".

Tolkien had thus made the Ring the central element of the chapter, and of the book, but it still took in Hammond and Scull's words "much further thought" for the full history of the Rings to develop. In Scull's view, he probably only finally settled the relationship of the Rings of Power to Sauron in the autumn of 1941. Christopher Tolkien discusses the manuscript evidence in The Treason of Isengard. (Note: Tolkien 1989, pp. 259–260) In 1944, Tolkien returned to the chapter, adding descriptions of Gollum, the Ring, and the hunt for Gollum by Gandalf, the Elves, and Aragorn.

== Plot ==
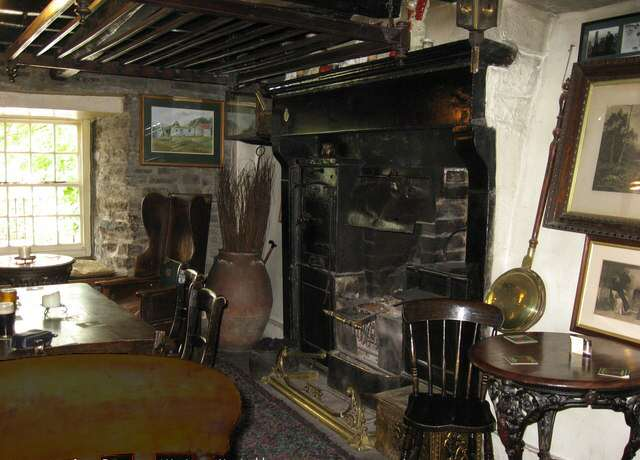
The chapter begins in the peaceful setting of Hobbiton in the Shire, where there is drinking and debate in the comfortable Green Dragon Inn. Pictured is the Green Dragon Inn at Hardraw, North Yorkshire.

=== Present-tense start ===
Frodo grows restless in his comfortable home, Bag End, in the Shire, and starts to hear rumours of a dark power growing in the East. His gardener, Sam Gamgee, who likes tales of Elves, discusses the rumours in the Green Dragon Inn with Ted Sandyman, the miller's son. Ted thinks the tales are irrelevant nonsense. (Note: Tolkien 1954a, book 1, ch. 2, "The Shadow of the Past")

=== Flashback narrative ===
The Wizard Gandalf makes one of his rare visits to the Shire, 17 years after Bilbo's farewell birthday party. He tells Frodo about the danger he is in through the Ring that his cousin Bilbo has given him. After heating the Ring with fire, Gandalf confirms through the inscription that it is the One Ring. He states that the dark lord Sauron is intently focussed on finding and reacquiring the One Ring, which he needs "to give him strength and knowledge to beat down all resistance, break the last defences, and cover all the lands in a second darkness". Gandalf explains that Sauron "let a great part of his own former power" pass into the Ring to enable him to rule all of the other Rings of Power.

Gandalf tells Frodo of the Ring's history: Sauron made the Ring in Mount Doom and used it to wage war on Middle-earth until Isildur cut the Ring from Sauron's hand, destroying the dark lord's physical form. Isildur refused to destroy the Ring, however, and it eventually led him to his death in the River Anduin. The Ring was lost for over 2,000 years until the Stoorish Hobbit Déagol found it while fishing in the Anduin. His relative Sméagol, who was fishing with Déagol, was instantly ensnared by the Ring and murdered him to take it for himself; the Ring turned him into the creature Gollum, who, centuries later, lost his "Precious" to Bilbo in the riddle game portrayed in The Hobbit. Gollum went in search of Bilbo and the Ring a few years later, and was eventually captured by Sauron, who tortured him into revealing that "Baggins" from "the Shire" had the Ring. Gandalf says that the only way to destroy the Ring is to throw it into the fires of Mount Doom.

Frodo decides he must leave the Shire, and agrees with Gandalf that he will travel to Rivendell, home to Elrond, a leader of the Elves. Gandalf hears something and catches Sam eavesdropping under the window. He tells Sam he will have to go with Frodo.

== Structure ==
Diagram of Kate Nepveu's analysis of the chapter as a circular structure

Kate Nepveu, writing for Tor.com, calls the chapter "remarkable in both mechanics and content". That is because it consists in large part of Gandalf talking to Frodo and steadily providing him with information. She writes that the structure "might be frowned upon as inelegant", but nevertheless engages the reader. She notes that the subject of the conversation circles around from the danger of possessing the Ring, to its faraway history, back to the danger it poses to the Shire and to Frodo, in nine sections. She comments that, following the science fiction and fantasy author Ursula Le Guin, it could be called a "there and back again" structure.

Shippey mentions another distinctive structural feature of the chapter. The whole two-book volume is narrated as a single strand with Frodo as the protagonist, except for the flashback narratives within "The Shadow of the Past" and later "The Council of Elrond". The Tolkien scholar Verlyn Flieger adds that the two chapters are similar in that "the past must be recapitulated by Gandalf or Elrond [in their respective flashback sections] in order to explain the present".

== Themes ==
=== Time and depth ===
After the light tone of the first chapter, "A Long-Expected Party", Tolkien deepens the plot. He starts to give the reader a sense of the depth of time behind the unfolding events, and the feeling that past and present are connected. Flieger writes that in the chapter, time both provides "the essential framework of the narrative [and] becomes the traveled road between past and present, connecting the two worlds."

The chapter was originally titled "Ancient History". This contributes to the feeling, Lawrence Krikorian writes in Mallorn, that Tolkien is reporting a "true history of Middle-earth". Tolkien later reinforces this feeling by adding small seemingly irrelevant details and talk of locking Frodo up in a tower to write the story of the quest.

=== Gollum and the Ring ===
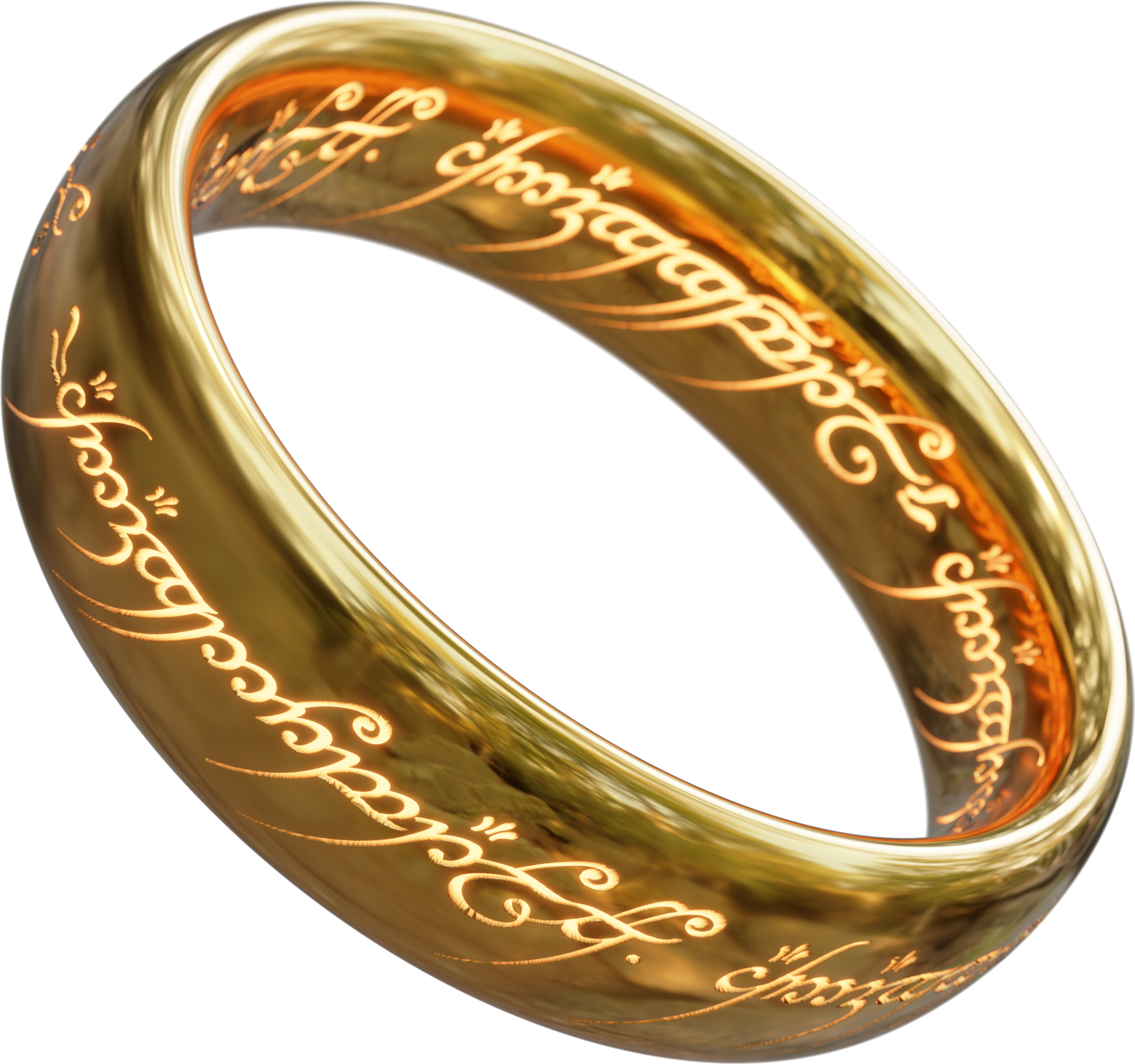
Gandalf proves that Frodo's Ring is the One Ring, of enormous power, by throwing it into Frodo's fireplace. This reveals the text of the Rhyme of the Rings, written in fiery letters visible only when the Ring is heated.

"The Shadow of the Past" begins to reveal the power of the Ring. The chapter transforms the Ring from the simple plot device of The Hobbit to a central element of the book. The episcopal priest Fleming Rutledge notes that Tolkien called it "the crucial chapter". In her view, the key passage is Gandalf's narration of Gollum's "slimy and murderous deed": Gollum strangles his relative Deagol to gain possession of the Ring. Frodo describes the act as loathsome, but Gandalf replies that Gollum's corruption "is a sad story, and it could have happened to others, even to some hobbits I have known"; Rutledge calls this "a central insight". She comments that Gandalf is hinting that Frodo should not be so quick to judge Gollum. She compares the remark to Matthew 7:1 "Judge not, that ye be not judged".

Shippey summarizes Gandalf's explanations of the Ring as "three basic data". Firstly, the Ring is enormously powerful, whether in the right or the wrong hands. Secondly, it is dangerous "and ultimately fatal to all its possessors – in a sense, there are no right hands". Finally, it cannot just be set aside quietly, but that it will have to be destroyed in the place where it was made, Mount Doom. In his view, that adds up to the modern saying "Power corrupts, and absolute power corrupts absolutely". That view, of the corrupting effect of the Ring's power, could be said, he writes, to be the core of the book. Shippey compares this with the pigs-turned-farmers of George Orwell's Animal Farm, another modern fantasy written in response to war, writing that "in an age which has seen many pigs become farmers", no reviewer has ever complained about Tolkien's "opening move" in the chapter.

Shippey states that the centre of Gandalf's account in the chapter is the Rhyme of the Rings. He adds that the verse, one of many in The Lord of the Rings, serves as the epigraph of the whole book and as final proof of the Ring's nature:

One Ring to rule them all, One Ring to find them,
One Ring to bring them all and in the darkness bind them
In the land of Mordor where the Shadows lie.

=== Providence, free will and predestination ===
The chapter introduces Tolkien's thinking on the interrelated questions of providence, free will, and predestination; these pervade the story. Commentators including Shippey have remarked on a statement by Gandalf in the chapter that appears to hint at a benevolent power behind the scenes:

Behind that there was something else at work, beyond any design of the Ring-maker. I can put it no plainer than by saying that Bilbo was meant (sic) to find the Ring, and not by its maker. In which case you also were meant to have it. And that may be an encouraging thought.

The scholar Kathleen Dubs examines the Boethian philosophy of providence that in her view Tolkien seems to follow. In this case, it is that bearing the Ring is in some way "meant" or "appointed" for Frodo, yet all the same his will is free: he can choose to accept the task or not. She quotes English literature scholar Paul Kocher's analysis of Frodo's acceptance of the quest. He writes that Gandalf, like Elrond in "The Council of Elrond", is quite tentative in his guidance. Gandalf does not assume that Frodo will do "what he was intended to do, though he should". Instead, he makes it clear to Frodo that "the decision lies with you".

=== War ===
The scholar Elizabeth Goodenough writes that the chapter's title "resonantly links not only the past and coming war against Sauron" but also both the First World War, in which Tolkien had fought, and the Second World War, during which he wrote much of The Lord of the Rings. In his foreword to the second edition, Tolkien denied that either the book or the chapter reflected the Second World War:

[The Lord of the Rings] is neither allegorical nor topical. As the story grew it put down roots (into the past) and threw out unexpected branches: but its main theme was settled from the outset by the inevitable choice of the Ring as the link between it and The Hobbit. The crucial chapter, "The Shadow of the Past", is one of the oldest parts of the tale. It was written long before the foreshadow of 1939 [the start of the Second World War] had yet become a threat of inevitable disaster, and from that point the story would have developed along essentially the same lines, if that disaster had been averted. Its sources are things long before in mind, or in some cases already written, and little or nothing in it was modified by the war that began in 1939 or its sequels.

== In film ==
In the film The Lord of the Rings: The Fellowship of the Ring, Peter Jackson presents Frodo as powerless and without initiative on hearing Gandalf's account of the Ring, unlike in Tolkien's text.

The Tolkien scholar Daniel Timmons notes that Peter Jackson, in his Lord of the Rings film trilogy, splits up Gandalf's description of the Ring's history to Frodo. Jackson puts part of it in Bag End and part of it much later in the darkness of the Mines of Moria. Timmons remarks that by making Frodo appear terrified by the news as late as Moria, Jackson makes Frodo appear not to have matured, whereas in the book Frodo has by then acquired a measure of wisdom and fortitude. Frodo's decision to leave the Shire is not moved, but it is heavily compressed. Timmons comments that the change makes Frodo seem powerless and without initiative, whereas in the book he is reflective, speaking at length, and makes his own decision.

== See also ==
- The Council of Elrond – where the Fellowship is assembled and the quest defined
- The Scouring of the Shire – where the hobbits use their new skills to restore their home to order

== Sources ==
- Carpenter, Humphrey (1978) [1977]. J. R. R. Tolkien: A Biography. G. Allen & Unwin. ISBN 978-0-04-928039-7.
- Carpenter, Humphrey, ed. (2023) [1981]. The Letters of J. R. R. Tolkien: Revised and Expanded Edition. New York: HarperCollins. ISBN 978-0-35-865298-4.
- Croft, Janet Brennan, ed. (2005). Tolkien on Film: Essays on Peter Jackson's The Lord of the Rings. Mythopoeic Press. ISBN 978-1887726092.
- Dubs, Kathleen E. (2004). "Providence, Fate, and Chance: Boethian Philosophy in The Lord of the Rings". In Chance, Jane (ed.). Tolkien and the Invention of Myth: A Reader. University Press of Kentucky. pp. 133–142. ISBN 978-0-8131-2301-1.
- Flieger, Verlyn (2001) [1997]. A Question of Time: J.R.R. Tolkien's Road to Faërie. Kent State University Press. ISBN 978-0-87338-699-9.
- Goodenough, Elizabeth (2008). Under Fire: Childhood in the Shadow of War. Wayne State University Press. ISBN 978-0-8143-3404-1. OCLC 173135727.
- Hammond, Wayne G.; Scull, Christina (2005). The Lord of the Rings: A Reader's Companion. HarperCollins. pp. 74–91. ISBN 978-0-007-20907-1.
- Kocher, Paul (1974) [1972]. Master of Middle-earth: The Achievement of J.R.R. Tolkien. Penguin Books. ISBN 978-0140038774.
- Krikorian, Lawrence (December 2018). "Realism in Fantasy: The Lord of the Rings As 'History ... Feigned'". Mallorn (59): 14–17.
- Nepveu, Kate (16 December 2008). "LotR re-read: Fellowship I.2, 'The Shadow of the Past'". Tor.com. – also presented as a table in Nepveu, Kate (11 June 2006). "LotR re-read: FotR I.2 revisited". Tor.com.
- Rutledge, Fleming (2004). The Battle for Middle-earth: Tolkien's Divine Design in The Lord of the Rings. William B. Eerdmans Publishing Company. ISBN 978-0-80282-497-4.
- Scott, Bud (2011). "Tolkien's use of free will versus predestination in The Lord of the Rings". Mallorn (51): 31–33.
- Scull, Christina (2006). "What Did He Know and When Did He Know It?". In Hammond, Wayne G.; Scull, Christina (eds.). The Lord of the Rings, 1954-2004: Scholarship in Honor of Richard E. Blackwelder. Marquette University Press. pp. 101–112. ISBN 978-0-87462-018-4. OCLC 298788493.
- Shippey, Tom (2005) [1982]. The Road to Middle-Earth: How J. R. R. Tolkien Created a New Mythology (Third ed.). HarperCollins. ISBN 978-0-261-10275-0.
- St. Clair, Gloriana (1995). "Tolkien as Reviser: A Case Study". Mallorn. 21 (2): 145–150.
- Tolkien, J. R. R. (1954a). The Fellowship of the Ring. The Lord of the Rings. Boston: Houghton Mifflin. OCLC 9552942.
- Tolkien, J. R. R. (1988). Christopher Tolkien (ed.). The Return of the Shadow. Boston: Houghton Mifflin. ISBN 978-0-395-49863-7.
- Tolkien, J. R. R. (1989). Christopher Tolkien (ed.). The Treason of Isengard. Boston: Houghton Mifflin. ISBN 978-0-395-51562-4.
