= Milton Waldman =

American author and publisher (1895–1976)

Milton Waldman (1895–1976) was an American author of historical biographies and literary advisor at William Collins, Sons, London. He is also remembered for his correspondence with J. R. R. Tolkien, who was seeking a publisher for his legendarium and The Lord of the Rings, combined into one work. Waldman was interested but refused to publish the work.

== Biography ==
Milton Waldman was born in 1895 in Cleveland, Ohio. He was educated at Yale University. During the First World War, he served in the United States Army. He wrote biographies of historical figures, especially Queens of England. His first published book was Americana in 1925, about American literature from the time of the first Europeans onwards. Around 1930 he moved to London, where he worked as an editor at the London Mercury literary journal, and as a literary advisor for the publisher Longmans, Green. In 1949 he became a literary advisor to the publisher William Collins, Sons. He rose to become director of that company. He also became managing director of the publisher Rupert Hart-Davis Ltd. He was made a fellow of the Royal Society of Letters. He had a son and two daughters. He died in London in 1976.

== Correspondence with Tolkien ==
In April 1950, the philologist and author J. R. R. Tolkien attempted to persuade Stanley Unwin, who had published The Hobbit, to publish both The Lord of the Rings and a selection from his legendarium, including material that later became The Silmarillion, as a two-volume book, but Unwin refused. Tolkien had already met Waldman, who had shown interest in both works; Tolkien had sent him a manuscript of the legendarium in 1949. Waldman replied that it was "a real work of creation", but expressed concern about its length. Accordingly, in 1951, Tolkien decided to approach William Collins, Sons to publish the two books together. Waldman was interested but asked Tolkien to shorten The Lord of the Rings. To help persuade Collins that the two were "interdependent and indivisible", Tolkien sent a long letter (#131) to Waldman, outlining the foundations and ambitions of his writings, and giving a potted history of the whole story from the creation, through the First, Second and Third Ages, and finishing with a reference to The Hobbit and a lengthy outline of The Lord of the Rings. (Note: The lengthy outline, omitted from the 1981 edition of Letters, has been published in The Lord of the Rings: A Reader's Companion. The letter has this and other omissions restored in the 2023 edition of The Letters of J. R. R. Tolkien.) The Tolkien scholar Colin Duriez describes the 10,000-word letter as "one of the best keys to the extraordinary legendarium". But further delays followed; Waldman was enthusiastic but the editors at Collins were not. In particular, the size of the work and the high price of paper at the time made for a large publication cost. In April 1952 Collins refused to publish the work.

== Works ==
- Americana, 1925
- Sir Walter Raleigh, 1928
- America Conquers Death, 1928
- King, Queen, Jack: Philip of Spain Courts Elizabeth, 1931
- England's Elizabeth, 1933
- Joan of Arc, 1935
- Biography of a Family: Catherine de Medici and Her Children, 1936
- Rod of Iron, 1941 (on tyrannical English Kings; also published as Some English Dictators)
- Elizabeth And Leicester, 1944
- Queen Elizabeth, 1952 (in the Brief Lives series)
- The Lady Mary, 1972 (on Mary Tudor)

== Sources ==
- Carpenter, Humphrey (1978) [1977]. J. R. R. Tolkien: A Biography. Unwin Paperbacks. ISBN 978-0-04928-039-7.
- Carpenter, Humphrey, ed. (2023) [1981]. The Letters of J. R. R. Tolkien: Revised and Expanded Edition. New York: HarperCollins. ISBN 978-0-35-865298-4.
- Groom, Nick (2020) [2014]. "The English Literary Tradition: Shakespeare to the Gothic". In Lee, Stuart D. (ed.). A Companion to J. R. R. Tolkien. Wiley Blackwell. pp. 286–302. doi:10.1002/9781118517468.ch20. ISBN 978-1119656029. OCLC 1183854105.
- Hammond, Wayne G.; Scull, Christina (2005). The Lord of the Rings: A Reader's Companion. London: HarperCollins. ISBN 0-00-720907-X.
