= Tolkien research =

Research related to J. R. R. Tolkien

The works of J. R. R. Tolkien have generated a body of research covering many aspects of his fantasy writings. These encompass The Lord of the Rings and The Silmarillion, along with his legendarium that remained unpublished until after his death, and his constructed languages, especially the Elvish languages Quenya and Sindarin. Scholars from different disciplines have examined the linguistic and literary origins of Middle-earth, and have explored many aspects of his writings from Christianity to feminism and race.

== Biographical ==
Biographies of Tolkien have been written by Humphrey Carpenter, with his 1977 J. R. R. Tolkien: A Biography and of Tolkien's wartime years by John Garth with his 2003 Tolkien and the Great War: The Threshold of Middle-earth. Carpenter edited the 1981 The Letters of J. R. R. Tolkien, assisted by Christopher Tolkien. The brief period after the war when Tolkien worked for the OED is detailed in the 2006 book The Ring of Words: Tolkien and the Oxford English Dictionary by Peter Gilliver, Jeremy Marshall and Edmund Weiner.

== On Tolkien's writings ==
=== Institutions ===
A variety of institutions have developed to support Tolkien research. These include The Tolkien Society and The Mythopoeic Society. Tolkien archives are held in the Bodleian Library in Oxford and Marquette University in Milwaukee, Wisconsin. Publishers of scholarly books on Tolkien include Houghton Mifflin, McFarland Press, Mythopoeic Press, Walking Tree Publishers, Palgrave MacMillan, and Kent State University Press.

=== Journals ===
Early publications on Tolkien's writing were essentially fanzines; some, such as Mythlore, founded in 1969, developed into scholarly peer-reviewed (refereed) technical publications; among the "reputable" journals is Mallorn by the Tolkien Society. Other specialised journals include Tolkien Studies (2004–) and Journal of Tolkien Research (2014–). There are several journals that focus on the literary society The Inklings, of which Tolkien was a member, especially Journal of Inklings Studies (2011–).

=== Conferences ===
In 1992, the Tolkien Society and the Mythopoeic Society held a joint conference for the centenary of Tolkien's birth, combining papers that were published in the conference proceedings, with a mixed programme of events over a period of eight days, 17–24 August 1992, in Oxford. The Mythopoeic Society has been holding conferences in the U.S. (and once in Canada) nearly annually since 1970. In recent years some conferences have been virtual.

Omentielva is a European bi-yearly conference on research into Tolkien's invented languages.

=== Fields ===
A large literature examines Tolkien's Middle-earth fantasy fiction from numerous points of view. Some scholars have investigated its philological roots in languages such as Old Norse and Old English. Others have explored its influences from literature of periods from classical and medieval to antiquarian and modern. Many have examined its themes including its poetry, its Christian symbolism, issues of feminism, race, and sexuality, and questions such as Tolkien's theory of sound and language. Others again have studied the literary devices that Tolkien used, such as his use of frame stories, interlacing of narrative, and his intentional creation of an Impression of depth. These are overviewed in Blackwell's 2014 A Companion to J. R. R. Tolkien, which effectively marked his acceptance into the English literary canon.

=== Constructed languages ===
Tolkien's constructed languages, Quenya and Sindarin, the main languages of Elves, have inspired linguistic research. Parma Eldalamberon and Vinyar Tengwar are published by the Elvish Linguistic Fellowship of the Mythopoeic Society, a non-profit organization. The Vinyar Tengwar and Parma Eldalamberon material published at an increasing rate during the early 2000s is from the stock of linguistic material in the possession of the appointed team of editors (some 3000 pages according to them), consisting of photocopies sent them by Christopher Tolkien and notes taken in the Bodleian Library around 1992. An Internet mailing list dedicated to Tolkien's languages, called tolklang, has existed since November 1, 1990.

== Bibliography ==
=== Major introductory books ===
- Drout, Michael D. C., ed. (2013) [2007]. "Tolkien Scholarship: Institutions". J.R.R. Tolkien Encyclopedia: Scholarship and Critical Assessment. Routledge. ISBN 978-0-415-86511-1.
- Flieger, Verlyn; Hostetter, Carl F., eds. (2000). Tolkien's Legendarium: Essays on The History of Middle-earth. Greenwood Press. ISBN 978-0-313-30530-6.
- Flieger, Verlyn (1983). Splintered Light: Logos and Language in Tolkien's World. Wm B. Eerdmans Publishing. ISBN 978-0-8028-1955-0.
- Hammond, Wayne G.; Christina Scull (2005). The Lord of the Rings: A Reader's Companion. HarperCollins. ISBN 978-0-00-720308-6.
- Hammond, Wayne G.; Scull, Christina (2006b). The J.R.R. Tolkien Companion and Guide: Reader's Guide. London: HarperCollins. ISBN 0-007-14918-2.
- Lee, Stuart D., ed. (2020) [2014]. A Companion to J. R. R. Tolkien. Wiley Blackwell. ISBN 978-1119656029.
- Olsen, Corey (2012). Exploring J.R.R. Tolkien's The Hobbit. Boston: Houghton Mifflin Harcourt. ISBN 978-0-547-73946-5.
- Pesch, Helmut W. (2003). Elbisch – Grammatik, Schrift und Wörterbuch der Elben-Sprache J.R.R. Tolkiens (in German). Bergisch Gladbach: Bastei-Lübbe. ISBN 3-404-20476-X.
- Shippey, Tom (1982). The Road to Middle-earth. George Allen and Unwin. ISBN 978-0-04-809018-8. (Revised and expanded 1992, 2005)
- Solopova, Elizabeth (2009). Languages, Myths and History: An Introduction to the Linguistic and Literary Background of J. R. R. Tolkien's Fiction. New York City: North Landing Books. ISBN 978-0-9816607-1-4.
- Whittingham, Elizabeth A. (2008). The Evolution of Tolkien's Mythology: A Study of the 'History of Middle-earth'. McFarland. ISBN 978-1-4766-1174-7.

=== Journals ===
- Fastitocalon: Studies in Fantasticism Ancient to Modern: Immortals and the Undead briefly existed in the 2010s.
- Journal of Tolkien Research (ISSN 2471-934X, Valparaiso University)
- Mallorn (ISSN 0308-6674, The Tolkien Society)
- Mythlore (ISSN 0146-9339, Mythopoeic Society)
- Tolkien Studies (ISSN 1547-3155, West Virginia University Press)
- Vinyar Tengwar (ISSN 1054-7606, Elvish Linguistic Fellowship)
