= Frodo Baggins =

Fictional hobbit protagonist in J. R. R. Tolkien's The Lord of the Rings

- Middle-earth character
- First appearance: The Fellowship of the Ring (1954)
- Last appearance: Bilbo's Last Song (1974)

In-universe information
- Alias: Mr. Underhill
- Race: Hobbit
- Gender: Male
- Affiliation: Company of the Ring
- Family: Bilbo Baggins
- Home: The Shire

Frodo Baggins is a fictional character in J. R. R. Tolkien's writings and one of the protagonists in The Lord of the Rings. Frodo is a hobbit of the Shire who inherits the One Ring from his cousin Bilbo Baggins, described familiarly as "uncle", and undertakes the quest to destroy it in the fires of Mount Doom in Mordor. He is mentioned in Tolkien's posthumously published works The Silmarillion and Unfinished Tales.

Frodo is repeatedly wounded during the quest and becomes increasingly burdened by the Ring as it nears Mordor. He changes, too, growing in understanding and compassion. On his return to the Shire, he is unable to settle back into ordinary life; two years after the Ring's destruction, he is allowed to take ship to the earthly paradise of Valinor.

Frodo's name comes from the Old English name Fróda, meaning "wise by experience". Commentators have written that he combines courage, selflessness, and fidelity and that as a good character, he seems unexciting but grows through his quest, an unheroic person who reaches heroic stature.

== Internal history ==
=== Background ===
Frodo is introduced in The Lord of the Rings as Bilbo Baggins' cousin (Note: Although Frodo referred to Bilbo as his "uncle", they were in fact first and second cousins, once removed either way (his paternal great-great-uncle's son's son and his maternal great-aunt's son).) and adoptive heir. (Note: Tolkien 1954a book 1, ch. 1, "A Long-Expected Party") Frodo's parents, Drogo Baggins and Primula Brandybuck, had been killed in a boating accident when Frodo was 12; Frodo spends the next nine years living with his maternal family, the Brandybucks, in Brandy Hall. At age 21, he is adopted by Bilbo, who brings him to live at Bag End in the Shire. He and Bilbo share the same birthday, the 22nd of September. Bilbo introduces Frodo to the Elvish languages, and they often go on long walks together. Due partly to their age difference, they refer to each other as "uncle" and "nephew."

=== The Fellowship of the Ring ===
Frodo comes of age as Bilbo leaves the Shire. Frodo inherits Bag End and Bilbo's ring. Gandalf, uncertain about the origin of the ring, warns Frodo to avoid using it and to keep it secret. Frodo keeps it hidden for the next 17 years, and it gives him the same longevity and youthful appearance it had given Bilbo. Gandalf returns to tell him that it is the One Ring of the Dark Lord Sauron, who is seeking to recover and use it to conquer Middle-earth. (Note: Tolkien 1954a book 1, ch. 2, "The Shadow of the Past")

Realising that he is a danger to the Shire as long as he remains there, Frodo decides to take the Ring to Rivendell, home of Elrond, a mighty Elf-lord. He leaves with three companions: his gardener Sam Gamgee and his cousins Merry Brandybuck and Pippin Took. They are just in time, for Sauron's most powerful servants, the Nine Nazgûl, have entered the Shire as Black Riders, looking for the Ring. They follow Frodo's trail, nearly intercepting him. (Note: Tolkien 1954a book 1, ch. 3, "Three is Company") (Note: Tolkien 1954a book 1, ch. 4, "A Short Cut to Mushrooms") (Note: Tolkien 1954a book 1, ch. 5, "A Conspiracy Unmasked")

The hobbits escape into the Old Forest. They are waylaid by the magic of Old Man Willow, but rescued by Tom Bombadil, (Note: Tolkien 1954a book 1, ch. 6, "The Old Forest") who gives them shelter and guidance. (Note: Tolkien 1954a book 1, ch. 7, "In the House of Tom Bombadil") They are caught in fog on the Barrow Downs by a barrow-wight and put under a spell. Frodo breaks free, attacks the barrow-wight, and summons Bombadil, who again rescues the hobbits and sets them on their way. (Note: Tolkien 1954a book 1, ch. 8, "Fog on the Barrow-Downs")

At the Prancing Pony inn, Frodo receives a delayed letter from Gandalf and meets a man calling himself Strider, a Ranger; his real name is Aragorn. The One Ring slips onto Frodo's finger in the inn's common room, turning him invisible. This attracts the Nazgûl, who ransack the hobbits' empty rooms in the night. (Note: Tolkien 1954a book 1, ch. 9, "At the Sign of the Prancing Pony") Strider leads the group through the marshes. (Note: Tolkien 1954a book 1, ch. 10, "Strider")

While encamped on Weathertop, they are attacked by five Nazgûl. The leader, the Witch-king of Angmar, stabs Frodo with a Morgul blade, the wound threatening to turn him into a wraith under the Nazgûl's control. (Note: Tolkien 1954a book 1, ch. 11, "A Knife in the Dark") Reaching Rivendell, (Note: Tolkien 1954a book 1, ch. 12, "Flight to the Ford") he is healed by Elrond. (Note: Tolkien 1954a book 2, ch. 1, "Many Meetings")

The Council of Elrond resolves to destroy the Ring by casting it into Mount Doom in Mordor, Sauron's realm. Frodo, realizing that he is destined for this task, steps forward to be the Ring-bearer. A Fellowship of nine companions is formed to assist him: the hobbits, Gandalf, Aragorn, the dwarf Gimli, the elf Legolas, and Boromir, a man of Gondor. Bilbo, living in Rivendell, gives Frodo his sword Sting and a coat of Dwarf mail made of mithril. (Note: Tolkien 1954a, book 2, ch. 2, "The Council of Elrond") The company, unable to cross the Misty Mountains by a pass, enters the mines of Moria. (Note: Tolkien 1954a book 2, ch. 3, "The Ring Goes South") Frodo is stabbed by an Orc with a spear, but his mithril mail-shirt saves his life. (Note: Tolkien 1954a book 2, ch. 4, "A Journey in the Dark") Gandalf is killed battling a Balrog. (Note: Tolkien 1954a book 2, ch. 5, "The Bridge of Khazad-Dum") Aragorn leads them out to Lothlórien. (Note: Tolkien 1954a book 2, ch. 6, "Lothlórien") There Galadriel gives Frodo an Elven cloak and a phial, which carries the Light of Eärendil to aid him on his quest. (Note: Tolkien 1954a book 2, ch. 8, "Farewell to Lórien")

The Fellowship travels by boat down the Anduin River and reaches the lawn of Parth Galen, just above the impassable falls of Rauros. (Note: Tolkien 1954a book 2, ch. 9, "The Great River") There, Boromir, succumbing to the lure of the Ring, tries to take it by force. Frodo escapes by putting it on. This breaks the Fellowship; the company is scattered by invading Orcs. Frodo chooses to continue the quest alone, but Sam follows him. (Note: Tolkien 1954a book 2, ch. 10, "The Breaking of the Fellowship")

=== The Two Towers ===
Frodo and Sam make their way through the wilds, followed by the monster Gollum, who has been tracking them, seeking to reclaim the Ring, which he had lost to Bilbo (as portrayed in The Hobbit). Gollum attacks the hobbits, but Frodo subdues him with Sting. He takes pity on Gollum and spares his life, making him promise to guide them through the dead marshes to the Black Gate. (Note: Tolkien 1954 book 4, ch. 1, "The Taming of Sméagol") (Note: Tolkien 1954 book 4, ch. 2, "The Passage of the Marshes") They find the gate impassable; Gollum tells them of "another way" into Mordor, (Note: Tolkien 1954 book 4, ch. 3, "The Black Gate is Closed") and Frodo, over Sam's objections, lets him lead them south into Ithilien. (Note: Tolkien 1954 book 4, ch. 4, "Of Herbs and Stewed Rabbit") There they meet Faramir, younger brother of Boromir, who takes them to a hidden cave. (Note: Tolkien 1954 book 4, ch. 5, "The Window on the West") Frodo allows Gollum to be captured by Faramir, saving Gollum's life but leaving him feeling betrayed. Faramir provisions the hobbits and sends them on their way, warning Frodo to beware of Gollum's treachery. (Note: Tolkien 1954 book 4, ch. 6, "The Forbidden Pool") (Note: Tolkien 1954 book 4, ch. 7, "Journey to the Cross-Roads")

They pass Minas Morgul, where the pull of the Ring becomes overwhelming, and climb the Endless Stair to cross into Mordor. (Note: Tolkien 1954 book 4, ch. 8, "The Stairs of Cirith Ungol") At the top they enter a tunnel, not knowing it is the home of the giant spider Shelob. Gollum hopes to deliver the hobbits to her and retake the Ring after she had killed them. Shelob stings Frodo, rendering him unconscious, but Sam drives her off with Sting and the Phial of Galadriel. (Note: Tolkien 1954 book 4, ch. 9, "Shelob's Lair") Believing that Frodo is dead, Sam takes the Ring and continues the quest. Soon, however, he overhears Orcs taking Frodo for questioning, saying that he is still alive. (Note: Tolkien 1954 book 4, ch. 10, "The Choices of Master Samwise")

=== The Return of the King ===
Sam rescues Frodo and returns the Ring. (Note: Tolkien 1955 book 6, ch. 1, "The Tower of Cirith Ungol") Dressed in scavenged Orc-armour, they set off, trailed by Gollum. (Note: Tolkien 1955 book 6, ch. 2, "The Land of Shadow") At Mount Doom, Frodo enters the chasm where Sauron had forged the Ring. Here Frodo loses the will to destroy the Ring, and puts it on, claiming it for himself. Gollum attacks the invisible Frodo, biting off his finger and reclaiming the Ring. As he dances in elation, Gollum falls with the Ring into the fiery Cracks of Doom. The Ring is destroyed, and with it Sauron's power. Frodo and Sam are rescued by Great Eagles as Mount Doom erupts, destroying Mordor. (Note: Tolkien 1955 book 6, ch. 3, "Mount Doom")

After Aragorn's coronation, the four hobbits return home. (Note: Tolkien 1955 book 6, ch. 7, "Homeward Bound") They find that the fallen wizard Saruman and his agents have taken over the Shire and started to industrialize it. Frodo and his companions lead a rebellion and defeat the intruders. Even after Saruman attempts to stab Frodo, Frodo lets him go, only for Saruman to be killed by his henchman Gríma Wormtongue. (Note: Tolkien 1955, book 6, ch. 8, "The Scouring of the Shire") The hobbits restore the Shire to its prior state of peace and goodwill. While successful in his quest, Frodo never recovers from the physical and emotional wounds he suffered on the quest. After two years, Frodo and Bilbo as Ring-bearers are granted passage to Valinor. (Note: Tolkien 1955 book 6, ch. 9, "The Grey Havens")

=== Other works ===
"The Sea-Bell" was published in Tolkien's 1962 collection of verse The Adventures of Tom Bombadil with the sub-title Frodos Dreme. Tolkien suggests that this enigmatic narrative poem represents the despairing dreams that visited Frodo in the Shire in the years following the destruction of the Ring. It relates the unnamed speaker's journey to a mysterious land across the sea, where he tries but fails to make contact with the people who dwell there. He descends into despair and near-madness, eventually returning to his own country, to find himself utterly alienated from those he once knew.

"Frodo the halfling" is mentioned briefly at the end of The Silmarillion, as "alone with his servant he passed through peril and darkness" and "cast the Great Ring of Power" into the fire. (Note: Tolkien 1977, "Of the Rings of Power and the Third Age")

In the poem Bilbo's Last Song, Frodo is at the Grey Havens at the farthest west of Middle-earth, about to leave the mortal world on an elven-ship to Valinor.

"The Hunt for the Ring" in Unfinished Tales describes how the Black Riders travelled to Isengard and the Shire in search of the One Ring, purportedly "according to the account that Gandalf gave to Frodo". (Note: In the fiction, the account survives as Frodo wrote it in the Red Book of Westmarch.) It is one of several mentions of Frodo in the book. (Note: Tolkien 1980, part 3, ch. 4 "The Hunt for the Ring")

=== Family tree ===
The Tolkien scholar Jason Fisher notes that Tolkien stated that hobbits were extremely "clannish" and had strong "predilections for genealogy". Accordingly, Tolkien's decision to include Frodo's family tree in Lord of the Rings gives the book, in Fisher's view, a strongly "hobbitish perspective". The tree also, he notes, serves to show Frodo's and Bilbo's connections and familial characteristics. Frodo's family tree is as follows: (Note: Tolkien 1955, Appendix C, "Family Trees")

Baggins family tree

Balbo Baggins	Berylla Boffin
Laura Grubb	Mungo	Pansy	Fastolph Bolger	Ponto	Mimosa Bunce	Lily	Togo Goodbody	Largo	Tanta Hornblower
Bungo	Belladonna Took	Belba	Rudigar Bolger	Longo	Camellia Sackville	Linda	Bodo Proudfoot	Bingo	Chica Chubb	Fosco	Ruby Bolger
Bilbo	Otho Sackville-Baggins	Lobelia Bracegirdle	Falco Chubb-Baggins	?	Dora	Drogo	Primula Brandybuck	Dudo	?
Lotho	Poppy	Filibert Bolger	Frodo	Daisy	Griffo Boffin

== Concept and creation ==
Frodo did not appear until the third draft of A Long-Expected Party (the first chapter of The Lord of the Rings), when he was named Bingo, son of Bilbo Baggins and Primula Brandybuck. In the fourth draft, he was renamed Bingo Bolger-Baggins, son of Rollo Bolger and Primula Brandybuck. Tolkien did not change the name to Frodo until the third phase of writing, when much of the narrative, as far as the hobbits' arrival in Rivendell, had already taken shape. (Note: Tolkien 1988, p. 309.) Prior to this, the name "Frodo" had been used for the character who eventually became Pippin Took. (Note: Tolkien 1988, p. 267.) In drafts of the final chapters, published as Sauron Defeated, Gandalf names Frodo Bronwe athan Harthad ("Endurance Beyond Hope"), after the destruction of the Ring. Tolkien states that Frodo's name in Westron was Maura Labingi. (Note: Tolkien 1996, "The Appendix on Languages")

== Analysis ==
=== Name and origins ===
Frodo is the only prominent hobbit whose name is unexplained in Tolkien's Appendices to The Lord of the Rings. In a letter Tolkien states that it is the Old English name Fróda, connected to fród, "wise by experience". (Note: Carpenter 2023, Letters #168 to Richard Jeffrey, 7 September 1955) The Tolkien scholar Tom Shippey suggests that the choice of name is significant: not, in Tolkien's phrase, one of the many "names that had no meaning at all in [the hobbits'] daily language". Instead, he notes, the Old Norse name Fróði is mentioned in Beowulf as the minor character Fróda. Fróði was, he writes, said by Saxo Grammaticus and Snorri Sturluson to be a peaceful ruler at the time of Christ, his time being named the Fróða-frið, the peace of Fróði. This was created by his magic mill, worked by two female giants, that could churn out peace and gold. He makes the giants work all day long at this task, until they rebel and grind out an army instead, which kills him and takes over, making the giants grind salt until the sea is full of it. The name Fróði is forgotten. Clearly, Shippey observes, evil is impossible to cure; and Frodo too is a "peacemaker, indeed in the end a pacifist". And, he writes, as Frodo gains experience through the quest, he also gains wisdom, matching the meaning of his name. The name 'Frodo Baggins' is ostensibly a translation from the Westron name "Maura Labingi"; Tolkien stated that maur- was hobbitish for "wise", equivalent to Germanic fród-. (Note: Tolkien 1996, The Appendix on Languages)

=== Character ===
Michael Stanton, writing in the J.R.R. Tolkien Encyclopedia, describes Frodo's character as combining "courage, selflessness, and fidelity", attributes that make Frodo ideal as a Ring-bearer. He lacks Sam's simple sturdiness, Merry and Pippin's clowning, and the psychopathology of Gollum, writes Stanton, bearing out the saying that good is less exciting than evil; but Frodo grows through his quest, becoming "ennobled" by it, to the extent that returning to the Shire feels in Frodo's words "like falling asleep again".

=== Christ figure ===
Tolkien was a devout Catholic, and wrote in his private letters that his Middle-earth stories were Christian. (Note: Carpenter 2023, Letters #213 to Deborah Webster, 25 October 1958) Scholars including Peter Kreeft, Paul E. Kerry, and Joseph Pearce state that there is no one complete, concrete, visible Christ figure in The Lord of the Rings, but Frodo serves as the priestly aspect of Christ, alongside Gandalf as prophet and Aragorn as King, together making up the threefold office of the Messiah.

=== Tragic hero ===
The Tolkien scholar Jane Chance quotes Randel Helms's view that in both The Hobbit and Lord of the Rings, "a most unheroic hobbit [Bilbo, Frodo] achieves heroic stature" in a quest romance. Chance writes that Frodo grows from seeing the threat as external, such as from the Black Riders, to internal, whether within the Fellowship, as shown by Boromir's attempt on the Ring, or within himself, as he struggles against the controlling power of the Ring. Tolkien scholar Thomas P. Hillman writes that, while Frodo's compassion for Gollum helps defend him against the Ring's temptation, no mortal (including Frodo) could have resisted its power indefinitely.

Verlyn Flieger, a scholar of literature and of Tolkien's works, summarizes Frodo's role in Lord of the Rings: "The greatest hero of all, Frodo Baggins, is also the most tragic. He comes to the end of his story bereft of the Ring, denied in his home Shire the recognition he deserves, and unable to continue his life as it was before his terrible adventure."

=== Psychology ===
Both medical and Tolkien scholars have suggested that Frodo, returning "irreparably wounded" from his quest, may suffer from post-traumatic stress disorder. On returning to the Shire, he withdraws from society and relives traumatic experiences through vivid flashbacks. He experiences chronic pain in the shoulder wound he received on Weathertop. Scholars have likened the intrusive pull of the Ring on Frodo to the effects of addiction, obsessive-compulsive disorder or psychological abuse.

=== Providence ===
The Tolkien critic Paul H. Kocher discusses the role of providence, in the form of the intentions of the angel-like Valar or of the creator Eru Ilúvatar, in Bilbo's finding of the Ring and Frodo's bearing of it; as Gandalf says, Frodo was "meant" to have it, though it remains his choice to co-operate with this purpose.

=== Allegiances and betrayals ===
Frodo is at the centre of a complex web of medieval feudal-style allegiances and betrayals, involving Sam, Gollum, and Faramir. Sam serves him faithfully, but accidentally betrays him to Faramir with the smoke from his cooking fire, and then by mentioning the Ring. Frodo offers his service to Faramir, who reciprocally grants him protection in the manner of a feudal lord to a vassal. Gollum swears to Frodo not to run off, and for a time guides him faithfully; Frodo is obliged by Faramir to lure Gollum into captivity, which Gollum sees as a betrayal. Gollum then swears to Faramir never to revisit the forbidden pool outside Faramir's secret stronghold. Frodo thus appears both as a feudal master (to Sam and Gollum) and as a feudal vassal (to Faramir).

Imagemap with clickable links. Allegiances and betrayals around Frodo, as analysed by Jane Chance

== Adaptations ==
Frodo in Ralph Bakshi's 1978 animated version

Frodo appears in adaptations of The Lord of the Rings for radio, cinema, and stage. In Ralph Bakshi's 1978 animated version, Frodo was voiced by Christopher Guard. In the 1980 Rankin/Bass animated version of The Return of the King, made for television, the character was voiced by Orson Bean, who had previously played Bilbo in the same company's adaptation of The Hobbit. In the "massive" 1981 BBC radio serial of The Lord of the Rings, Frodo is played by Ian Holm, who later played Bilbo in Peter Jackson's film adaptation of The Lord of the Rings. In Leningrad Television's two-part 1991 teleplay Khraniteli (Keepers [of the Ring]), Frodo was played by Valery Dyachenko, while in the Finnish broadcaster Yle's 1993 television miniseries Hobitit, the role is played by Taneli Mäkelä.

Elijah Wood as Frodo in Peter Jackson's film trilogy

In Peter Jackson's The Lord of the Rings film trilogy (2001–2003), Frodo is played by the American actor Elijah Wood. Dan Timmons writes in Janet Brennan Croft's 2004 Tolkien on Film that the themes and internal logic of the Jackson films are undermined by the portrayal of Frodo, which he considers a weakening of Tolkien's original. The film critic Roger Ebert writes that he missed the depth of characterisation he felt in the book, Frodo doing little but watching other characters decide his fate "and occasionally gazing significantly upon the Ring". Peter Travers of Rolling Stone, however, wrote that Wood played the role with "soulful conviction", and that his portrayal matured as the story progressed. Wood reprised the role in a brief appearance in The Hobbit: An Unexpected Journey.

On stage, Frodo was portrayed by James Loye in the three-hour stage production of The Lord of the Rings, which opened in Toronto in 2006, and was brought to London in 2007. Frodo was portrayed by Joe Sofranko in the Cincinnati productions of The Fellowship of the Ring (2001), The Two Towers (2002), and The Return of the King (2003) for Clear Stage Cincinnati.

== See also ==
- Rings of Power – Artefacts in Tolkien's legendarium

== Sources ==
- Carpenter, Humphrey, ed. (2023) [1981]. The Letters of J. R. R. Tolkien: Revised and Expanded Edition. New York: HarperCollins. ISBN 978-0-35-865298-4.
- Tolkien, J. R. R. (1954a). The Fellowship of the Ring. The Lord of the Rings. Boston: Houghton Mifflin. OCLC 9552942.
- Tolkien, J. R. R. (1954). The Two Towers. The Lord of the Rings. Boston: Houghton Mifflin. OCLC 1042159111.
- Tolkien, J. R. R. (1955). The Return of the King. The Lord of the Rings. Boston: Houghton Mifflin. OCLC 519647821.
- Tolkien, J. R. R. (1977). Christopher Tolkien (ed.). The Silmarillion. Boston: Houghton Mifflin. ISBN 978-0-395-25730-2.
- Tolkien, J. R. R. (1980). Christopher Tolkien (ed.). Unfinished Tales. Boston: Houghton Mifflin. ISBN 978-0-395-29917-3.
- Tolkien, J. R. R. (1988). Christopher Tolkien (ed.). The Return of the Shadow. Boston: Houghton Mifflin. ISBN 978-0-395-49863-7.
- Tolkien, J. R. R. (1996). Christopher Tolkien (ed.). The Peoples of Middle-earth. Boston: Houghton Mifflin. ISBN 978-0-395-82760-4.
