= The J. R. R. Tolkien Companion and Guide =

2006 book of Tolkien scholarship

- Author: Christina Scull and Wayne G. Hammond
- Language: English
- Subject: J. R. R. Tolkien, Tolkien's legendarium
- Genre: Non-fiction
- Publisher: HarperCollins (UK), Houghton Mifflin (US)
- Publication date: 2006
- Pages: 2300
- ISBN: 978-0-618-39113-4
- OCLC: 70803518

The J. R. R. Tolkien Companion and Guide is a 2006 reference book by the husband and wife team of Christina Scull and Wayne G. Hammond. It provides a detailed chronology of Tolkien's life in volume 1, and a reader's guide in volume 2. The second edition in 2017 revised and extended the work, the reader's guide being divided into two volumes.

== Book ==
=== First edition (2006) ===
The J. R. R. Tolkien Companion and Guide (2006) by Christina Scull and Wayne G. Hammond is a two-volume work of reference on J. R. R. Tolkien and Tolkien studies. It follows their 2005 book The Lord of the Rings: A Reader's Companion.

Volume 1 "Chronology" presents an extraordinarily detailed chronology of Tolkien's life in 800 pages. Volume 2 "Reader's Guide" has information on people, places, organisations, biographical topics, literary topics and writings by Tolkien. The preface states that it is not "a handbook of his invented lands and characters".

=== Revised and expanded edition (2017) ===
The 2017 edition is expanded to three volumes. Volume 1 "Chronology" extends the chronology of Tolkien's life to 936 pages. Volumes 2 and 3 are the "Reader's Guide", split into Part I (A–M) and Part II (N–Z). The entire work occupies 2720 pages.

== Reception ==
=== Of the first edition ===
David Oberhelman, writing in Mythlore, call The J. R. R. Tolkien Companion and Guide "undoubtedly a seminal if not the definitive reference work on the Professor". He states that "in true Tolkien fashion, [it] grew in the telling". In his opinion, "the breadth of the coverage and the authority with which Scull and Hammond document Tolkien's life and times will make these books an invaluable supplement to Humphrey Carpenter's classic 1977 biography and their own 2005 The Lord of the Rings: A Reader's Companion. Oberhelman notes that rather than studying the fictional Middle-earth, the work focuses on Tolkien himself, describing "people, places and things" linked to Tolkien. Where there is interpretation beyond what Tolkien or his son Christopher write, the work tends to cite scholars like Verlyn Flieger and Tom Shippey. Arguments are presented in a balanced way, and the discussions are "always informative as well as entertaining". Oberhelman calls the work "truly a monumental achievement".

John Garth, in Tolkien Studies, describes Scull and Hammond's work as a "super-heavyweight contribution by two highly regarded veterans of Tolkien studies." In his view, while Michael D. C. Drout's The J. R. R. Tolkien Encyclopedia may have the edge on matters of criticism, Scull and Hammond is best on "biographical matters". The work's encyclopedic structure "rightly" avoids having entries on fictional people, places, and "totems", an approach that works like Robert Foster's The Complete Guide to Middle-earth had incautiously adopted. Instead, it "ambitiously" aims to cover the whole of Tolkien's life in diaristic detail, as The Letters of J. R. R. Tolkien did for 1944, given that Tolkien had written repeatedly to his son Christopher in that year detailing small events in his life. The result is to offer the scholar and the interested reader a wealth of detail on why and how Tolkien wrote as he did.

=== Of the second edition ===
Jason Fisher, also writing in Tolkien Studies, notes that early reviewers were correct to predict the "lasting value" of Scull and Hammond's work, calling it "an indispensable resource" alongside the pair's other books, especially "for matters of biography and bibliography." He explicitly endorses the praise of the work by both Oberhelman and Garth, stating that it is "still deserve[d]". He notes that many "defects and oversights" in the first edition have been fixed. These include the provision of running headwords (at the top of each page) and of a list of the topics covered by the work. He notes, too, that the work has been greatly expanded, incorporating years' worth of material on the authors' website.

== See also ==
- The J. R. R. Tolkien Encyclopedia
