= J. R. R. Tolkien: A Descriptive Bibliography =

Bibliography by Douglas A. Anderson and Wayne G. Hammon

- Author: Wayne G. Hammond and Douglas A. Anderson
- Language: English
- Published: January 1, 1993
- Publisher: St. Paul's Bibliographies (first edition), Oak Knoll Press (second edition)
- ISBN: 0938768425

J. R. R. Tolkien: A Descriptive Bibliography is a work by Douglas A. Anderson and Wayne G. Hammond that is a complete bibliography of the publications of J. R. R. Tolkien. It has a foreword by Rayner Unwin.

== Contents ==
The book subdivides the works of Tolkien into the following sections:

- Books by J. R. R. Tolkien
- Books edited, translated, or with contributions by J. R. R. Tolkien
- Contributions to Periodicals
- Published Letters and Excerpts
- Art by J. R. R. Tolkien
- Miscellanea
- Translations

== Publication ==
A first printing was published in 1993 by St. Paul's Bibliographies in the UK and Oak Knoll Press in the US. Oak Knoll published a second printing in 2002.

== Response ==
A review for the Bibliographical Society of America by Barbara A. Brannon calls it "an essential guide" for scholarship. The Tolkien Library says that "Anyone willing to collect books by Tolkien simply must have this book". The book was also the winner of the Mythopoeic Society's scholarship award for Inkling studies in 1994.
