= Boromir =

Fictional character in The Lord of the Rings

- Middle-earth character
- First appearance: The Lord of the Rings (1954)

In-universe information
- Race: Man
- Titles: Captain of the White Tower; High Warden of the White Tower; Steward-prince of Gondor
- Affiliation: Fellowship of the Ring
- Family: Faramir (brother); Denethor II (father)
- Home: Gondor

Boromir is a fictional character in J. R. R. Tolkien's legendarium. He appears in the first two volumes of The Lord of the Rings (The Fellowship of the Ring and The Two Towers), and is mentioned in the last volume, The Return of the King. He was the heir apparent of Denethor II (the 26th Steward of Gondor) and the elder brother of Faramir. In the course of the story Boromir joined the Fellowship of the Ring.

Boromir is portrayed as a noble character who believed passionately in the greatness of his kingdom and fought indomitably for it. His great stamina and physical strength, together with a forceful and commanding personality, made him a widely admired commander in Gondor's army and the favourite of his father Denethor. As a member of the Fellowship, his desperation to save his country ultimately drove him to betray his companions and attempt to seize the Ring, but he was redeemed by his repentance and brave last stand.

Commentators have remarked on Boromir's vainglory and desire for the Ring. They have compared him both to other proud Tolkien characters such as Fëanor and Túrin Turambar, and to medieval heroes like Roland, who also blew a horn in battle and was killed in the wilderness. His boat-funeral, too, has been likened to Scyld Scefing's ship-burial in Beowulf.

Boromir appears in animated and live-action films of Lord of the Rings, and in radio and television versions.

== Appearances ==
Boromir is the son of Denethor II and Lady Finduilas of Dol Amroth. He has a younger brother Faramir. A year after Faramir was born their father became the ruling Steward of Gondor, and Boromir became heir apparent, inheriting the Horn of Gondor. When Boromir's mother Finduilas dies, he is only 10. (Note: Tolkien 1955, Appendix B, "The Tale of Years", "The Third Age", entries from 2976 to 2988) Denethor always favours Boromir over Faramir; he loves Boromir "too much, perhaps; the more so because they were unlike". (Note: Tolkien 1955, book 5, ch. 1 "Minas Tirith")

In response to prophetic dreams that come to Faramir and later to himself, Boromir claims the quest of riding to Rivendell. His journey lasts a hundred and eleven days, and he travels through "roads forgotten" to reach Rivendell, though, as he says, "few knew where it lay". (Note: Tolkien 1954a, book 2, ch. 2, "The Council of Elrond") Boromir loses his horse while crossing the Greyflood and travels the rest of the way on foot. (Note: Tolkien 1954a book 2, ch. 8, "Farewell to Lórien")

=== The Fellowship of the Ring ===
In The Fellowship of the Ring, Boromir arrives at Rivendell just as the Council of Elrond is commencing. There he tells of Gondor's attempts to keep the power of Mordor at bay. He tries to persuade the council to let him take the One Ring to defend Gondor, but is told that it would corrupt and destroy its user, and alert Sauron to its presence. He accepts this for the moment. He agrees to accompany Aragorn to Gondor's capital, Minas Tirith, and since their path lies with the Fellowship for the first part of the journey, he pledges to protect the Ring-bearer, Frodo.

Boromir accompanies the Fellowship south from Rivendell. Before departing, he sounds the Horn of Gondor, saying he "would not go forth like a thief into the night". On the journey south, he questions the wisdom of their leader Gandalf. On the Fellowship's attempt to pass over the Misty Mountains, he advises that firewood be collected before the attempt to climb Caradhras, saving them from freezing in a blizzard. In the retreat from Caradhras, Boromir proves his strength as he and Aragorn force a way through shoulder-high snowbanks back down the mountain. (Note: Tolkien 1954a book 2, ch. 3, "The Ring Goes South")

The Fellowship then pass under the mountains through the caverns of Moria where Gandalf is killed, and Aragorn becomes their guide. (Note: Tolkien 1954a book 2, ch. 4, "A Journey in the Dark") (Note: Tolkien 1954a book 2, ch. 5, "The Bridge of Khazad-Dum") At the borders of the Elven realm of Lothlórien, Boromir is unnerved by the thought of entering, pleading with Aragorn to find another way "though it led through a hedge of swords"; he cites stories of elvish witchcraft, and the "strange paths" they had already taken which had caused Gandalf's death. (Note: Tolkien 1954a book 2, ch. 6, "Lothlórien") Once in Lórien, Boromir is greatly disturbed by Galadriel's testing of his mind, telling Aragorn "not to be too sure of this lady and her purposes". On parting, Galadriel gives Boromir a golden belt and an Elven-cloak.

Boromir had always planned to go to Minas Tirith, and despite the consensus reached at Rivendell that the Ring must be destroyed in Mordor, he urges the Fellowship to accompany him to Minas Tirith before going on to Mordor. (Note: Tolkien 1954a book 2, ch. 9, "The Great River") As Frodo ponders his course from Parth Galen, Boromir privately urges him to use the Ring in Gondor's defence, rather than to "throw it away". Finally, he succumbs to the temptation to take the Ring for himself, justifying this by his duty to his people and his belief in his own integrity. (Note: Tolkien 1954a book 2, ch. 10, "The Breaking of the Fellowship")

True-hearted Men, they will not be corrupted. We of Minas Tirith have been staunch through long years of trial. We do not desire the power of wizard-lords, only strength to defend ourselves, strength in a just cause. And behold! In our need chance brings to light the Ring of Power. It is a gift, I say; a gift to the foes of Mordor. It is mad not to use it, to use the power of the Enemy against him. The fearless, the ruthless, these alone will achieve victory. What could not a warrior do in this hour, a great leader? What could not Aragorn do? Or if he refuses, why not Boromir? The Ring would give me power of Command. How I would drive the hosts of Mordor, and all men would flock to my banner!

After seeing that Frodo is unconvinced, Boromir half begs, half commands him to at least lend the Ring, and when Frodo still refuses, Boromir leaps to seize it. Frodo vanishes by putting on the Ring and flees, intending to continue the quest alone. Boromir, realizing his betrayal, immediately repents of his actions and weeps. Searching unsuccessfully for Frodo, he tells the Fellowship of Frodo's disappearance, though not of his own misdeeds. The hobbits in a frenzy scatter to look for Frodo. Aragorn, suspecting Boromir's part in Frodo's flight, orders him to follow and protect Merry and Pippin. The Fellowship is attacked by a band of orcs.

=== The Two Towers ===
Fighting to defend Merry and Pippin, Boromir is mortally wounded by orc-arrows. In Pippin's words: (Note: Tolkien 1954, book 3, ch. 1 "The Uruk-hai")

Then Boromir had come leaping through the trees. He had made them fight. He slew many of them and the rest fled. But they had not gone far on the way back when they were attacked again, by a hundred Orcs at least, some of them very large, and they shot a rain of arrows: always at Boromir. Boromir had blown his great horn till the woods rang, and at first the Orcs had been dismayed and had drawn back; but when no answer but the echoes came, they had attacked more fiercely than ever. Pippin did not remember much more. His last memory was of Boromir leaning against a tree, plucking out an arrow; then darkness fell suddenly.

Blasts from Boromir's horn alert Aragorn, but he comes too late to prevent the hobbits' capture. As Boromir lies dying, he remorsefully confesses to attempting to take the Ring from Frodo. He urges Aragorn to save Minas Tirith, as he himself has failed. Aragorn reassures him that he has not failed, that indeed "few have gained such a victory". Aragorn, Gimli, and Legolas place Boromir's body in one of their Elven boats, with his sword, belt, cloak, broken horn, and the weapons of his slain foes about him. They set the boat adrift in the river toward the Falls of Rauros, singing a lament for his funeral. (Note: Tolkien 1954, book 3, ch. 1 "The Departure of Boromir")

Three days later, Faramir, to his and his father's great grief, sees the boat bearing his dead brother floating down the river. (Note: Tolkien 1955, book 4, ch. 5 "The Window on the West")

== Names and titles ==
Boromir is the son and heir apparent of Denethor, the ruling Steward of Gondor. Appendix A calls him "Captain of the White Tower", (Note: Tolkien 1955, Appendix A: part I, iv. "Gondor and the Heirs of Anarion") while Faramir called him "High Warden of the White Tower" and "our Captain-General". (Note: Tolkien 1954, book 4, ch. 4 "Of Herbs and Stewed Rabbit".)

Boromir was described by Tolkien as a name "of mixed form"; (Note: Tolkien 1955, Appendix F: part I, "Of Men" note 1) it combines Sindarin bor(on)- 'steadfast' and Quenya míre 'jewel'. (Note: Tolkien 1987, "The Etymologies", entries BOR- and MIR-.) But the Stewards of Gondor also often bore names "remembered in the songs and histories of the First Age", regardless of meaning, and the name Boromir did appear during the First Age in The Silmarillion. (Note: Tolkien 1977, ch. 17 "Of the Coming of Men into the West") The eleventh steward of Gondor, Denethor I, had as well a son called Boromir who was described as a great warrior. This might have been an inspiration for Denethor II to name his first son.

== Analysis ==
=== Morality ===
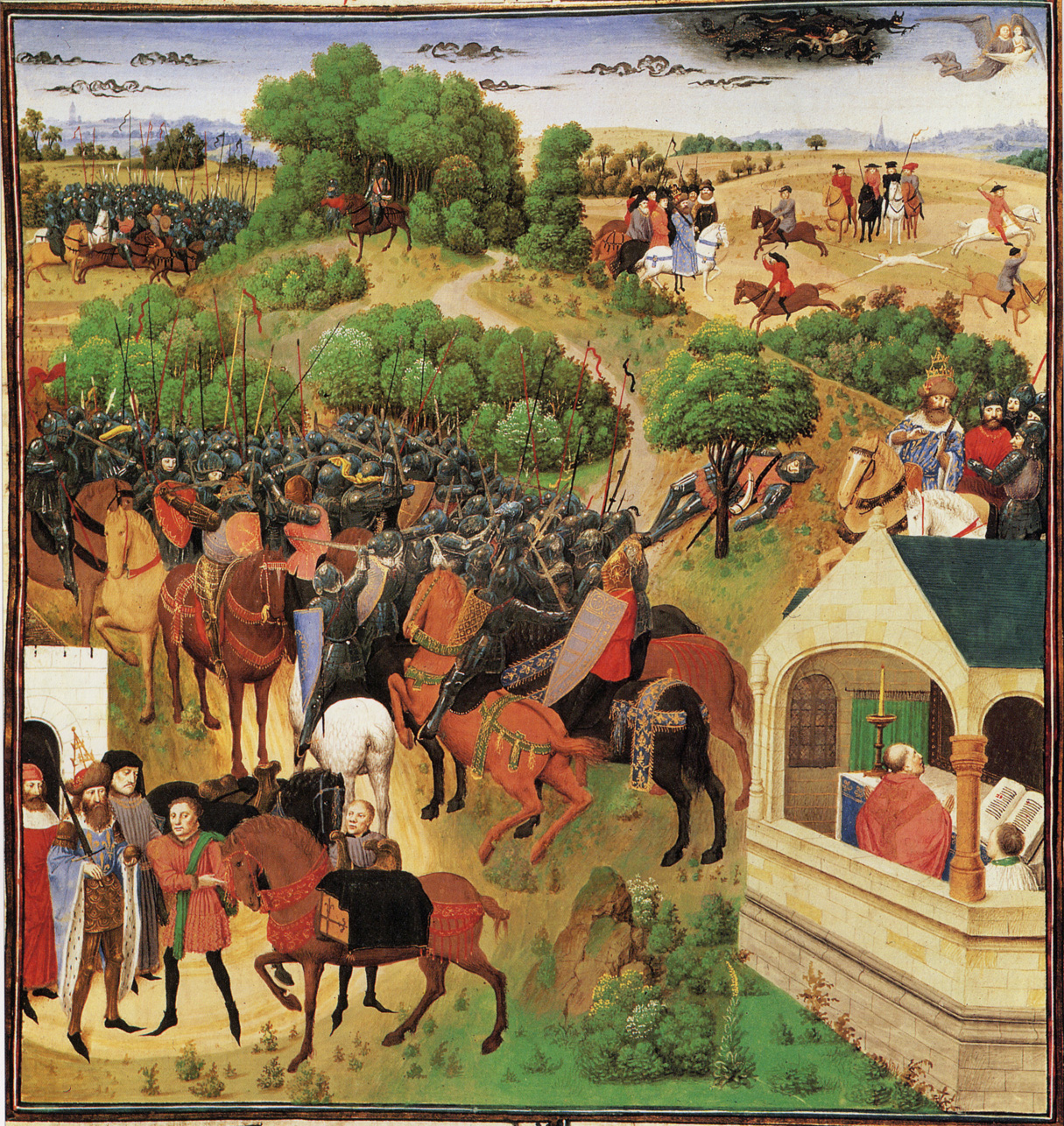
Boromir's life and death have been compared to the legendary medieval hero Roland. 15th century painting showing eight stages of Roland's life

Boromir's desire for the Ring has been described as well-intentioned but uninformed by the potential danger. His perception of Middle-earth is biased by a belief that divine powers have chosen Gondor to lead the fight against evil. He is always eager to praise the great deeds of Gondor, including his own. Boromir's hubris makes him prey to the malign power of the Ring, and he seals his own doom when he attacks Frodo to seize it. He makes way thereby for Aragorn to become the future king of Gondor, in a manner similar to Virgil's character Turnus. He speaks of using the Ring in the service of Gondor, but his talk of "strength in a just cause" indicates, writes the Tolkien critic Tom Shippey, only how matters would begin. He comments that Boromir never quite says "the end justifies the means", though the thought makes his corrupted behaviour entirely believable.

In Christian terms, Boromir atones for his assault on Frodo by single-handedly but vainly defending Merry and Pippin from orcs, which illustrates the Catholic theme of the importance of good intention, especially at the point of death. This is clear from Gandalf's statement: "But he [Boromir] escaped in the end... It was not in vain that the young hobbits came with us, if only for Boromir's sake." (Note: Tolkien 1954, book 3, ch. 5 "The White Rider")

Boromir has been likened to other Tolkien characters such as Fëanor or Túrin Turambar who display vainglorious excess, a trait in leaders that Tolkien despised. The character of Boromir has been compared to the legendary medieval hero Roland. Both blow a horn in the distress of battle and both are eventually killed in the wilderness while defending their companions, although Roland is portrayed as blameless and heroic throughout. Further, Roland's death gives the appearance of signalling the end of the ruling dynasty.

=== Boat-funeral ===
The ship-burials of the seafaring Numenoreans in The Lost Road and Other Writings (Note: Tolkien 1987, ch. 2 "The Fall of Numenor") have been compared to those of the Viking age as described in the Prose Edda and in the Old English poem Beowulf; Boromir is similarly given a boat-funeral. As with Scyld Scefing's funeral ship in Beowulf, no-one knows where the boat goes to in the end, but for Tolkien the suggestion that it goes to a mysterious land in the uttermost West was fascinating, and he developed it at length in The Lost Road.

Boromir's funeral compared to the ship-burial in Beowulf
| Beowulf 2:36b–42 Scyld Scefing's funeral | Translation | "Departure of Boromir" (prose) |
|---|---|---|
| þær wæs madma fela of feorwegum frætwa gelæded; ne hyrde ic cymlicor ceol gegyrwan hildewæpnum ond heaðowædum, billum ond byrnum; him on bearme læg madma mænigo, þa him mid scoldon on flodes æht feor gewitan. | There was much treasure from faraway ornaments brought not heard I of more nobly a ship prepared war-weapons and war-armour sword and mail; on his lap lay treasures many then with him should on floods' possession far departed. | Now they laid Boromir in the middle of the boat that was to bear him away. The grey hood and elven-cloak they folded and placed beneath his head. They combed his long dark hair and arrayed it upon his shoulders. The golden belt of Lórien gleamed about his waist. His helm they set beside him, and across his lap they laid the cloven horn and the hilts and shards of his sword; beneath his feet they put the swords of his enemies. |

== Portrayal in adaptations ==
Boromir in Ralph Bakshi's 1978 animated The Lord of the Rings

In both Ralph Bakshi's 1978 animated film and in the subsequent BBC Radio serial, Boromir is played by Michael Graham Cox.

Boromir is played by Carl-Kristian Rundman in the 1993 Finnish miniseries Hobitit.

In Peter Jackson's The Lord of the Rings film trilogy, Boromir is played by Sean Bean. His line "One does not simply walk into Mordor" became famous enough for Bean to comment that the "one does not simply" meme (with variant endings) would "probably be my unintended legacy". In a departure from the structure of Tolkien's book, Boromir's death is shown at the end of The Fellowship of the Ring (2001), instead of being related at the beginning of The Two Towers.

Sean Bean as Boromir in Peter Jackson's 2001 The Lord of the Rings: The Fellowship of the Ring

In The Two Towers (2002), Boromir appears in the theatrical version only briefly during the beginning flashback sequence of Gandalf's fight with the Balrog in Moria. The Extended Edition adds two additional flashbacks: first when Faramir remembers finding Boromir's body and his cloven horn in the elven boat washed up on shore; and in longer flashback (the only scene of the film trilogy where Boromir and Faramir are seen speaking to each other), after Boromir's victory in Osgiliath and before his departure for Rivendell. The two brothers are seen celebrating and laughing before their father interrupts, asking him to go to Rivendell to seek the One Ring. Here Boromir apparently knows that "Isildur's Bane" is the One Ring, and he is chosen by his father, despite his reluctance to go, in response to a summons from Elrond.

In The Return of the King (2003), Boromir appears in the theatrical version during a brief flashback as Pippin remembers his heroic self-sacrifice. In the Extended Edition of the film, Boromir appears briefly when Denethor looks at Faramir and imagines for a moment that he sees Boromir walking towards him, smiling.

== Sources ==
- Shippey, Tom (2005) [1982]. The Road to Middle-Earth: How J. R. R. Tolkien Created a New Mythology (Third ed.). HarperCollins. ISBN 978-0-261-10275-0.
- Tolkien, J. R. R. (1954a). The Fellowship of the Ring. The Lord of the Rings. Boston: Houghton Mifflin. OCLC 9552942.
- Tolkien, J. R. R. (1954). The Two Towers. The Lord of the Rings. Boston: Houghton Mifflin. OCLC 1042159111.
- Tolkien, J. R. R. (1955). The Return of the King. The Lord of the Rings. Boston: Houghton Mifflin. OCLC 519647821.
- Tolkien, J. R. R. (1977). Christopher Tolkien (ed.). The Silmarillion. Boston: Houghton Mifflin. ISBN 978-0-395-25730-2.
- Tolkien, J. R. R. (1987). Christopher Tolkien (ed.). The Lost Road and Other Writings. Boston: Houghton Mifflin. ISBN 0-395-45519-7.
