= Beowulf and the Critics =

Scholarly book

- first edition
- Editor: Michael D. C. Drout
- Author: J. R. R. Tolkien
- Subject: Beowulf criticism
- Genre: Literature, Essays
- Publisher: Arizona State University
- Publication date: 2002
- Publication place: United States

Beowulf and the Critics by J. R. R. Tolkien is a 2002 book edited by Michael D. C. Drout that presents scholarly editions of the two manuscript versions of Tolkien's essays or lecture series "Beowulf and the Critics", which served as the basis for the much shorter 1936 lecture "Beowulf: The Monsters and the Critics".

Beowulf and the Critics was awarded the 2003 Mythopoeic Scholarship Award for Inklings Studies.
