= The Letters of J. R. R. Tolkien =

Non-fiction book

- Dust wrapper of UK first edition
- Author: Humphrey Carpenter (editor), with Christopher Tolkien
- Language: English
- Subject: J. R. R. Tolkien; War; Tolkien's legendarium
- Genre: Letters
- Publisher: George Allen & Unwin, Houghton Mifflin
- Publication date: 1981; 2023 (expanded edition)
- Publication place: United Kingdom
- ISBN: 0-04-826005-3
- OCLC: 8628512
- Dewey Decimal: 828/.91209 B 19
- LC Class: PR6039.O32 Z48 1981b
- Preceded by: Unfinished Tales
- Followed by: Mr. Bliss

The Letters of J. R. R. Tolkien is a selection of the philologist and fantasy author J. R. R. Tolkien's letters. It was published in 1981, edited by Tolkien's biographer Humphrey Carpenter, who was assisted by Christopher Tolkien. The selection, from a large mass of materials, contains 354 letters. These were written between October 1914, when Tolkien was an undergraduate at Oxford, and 29 August 1973, four days before his death. The letters are of interest both for what they show of Tolkien's life and for his interpretations of his Middle-earth writings.

== Contents ==
The book has a 3-page introduction by its editor, Humphrey Carpenter. He notes that an "enormous quantity of material [had] to be omitted, and that only passages of particular interest could be included." Among the omissions is "the very large body of letters" written between 1913 and 1918 to Edith Bratt, who later became his wife. Carpenter notes that few letters from the period between 1918 and 1937 survive, and those "unfortunately" say nothing about the writing of The Silmarillion or of The Hobbit.

The body of the 1981 edition consists of extracts from 354 of J. R. R. Tolkien's many letters. The first, dated October 1914, is to Bratt, when Tolkien was an undergraduate at Oxford. The last, dated 29 August 1973, is to Priscilla Tolkien, his youngest child, four days before his death.

The letters are accompanied by detailed notes, and by an index compiled by the Tolkien scholars Christina Scull and Wayne G. Hammond.

The letters can be roughly divided into four categories:

1. Personal letters to Tolkien's wife Edith, his son Christopher Tolkien, and his other children
2. Letters about Tolkien's career as a professor of Anglo-Saxon
3. Letters to his publishers at Allen & Unwin
4. Letters about Tolkien's Middle-earth writings

Letters 29 and 30 show that a German translation of The Hobbit was being negotiated in 1938. The German publishing firm enquired whether Tolkien was of "arisch" (Aryan, i.e. non-Jewish) origin. Tolkien was infuriated by the inherent racism of this enquiry, and wrote two drafts of possible replies for his publisher to choose. Only one draft has survived, in which Tolkien pointed out the misuse of the word "Aryan" by the Nazis, and answered the inquiry to a possible Jewish origin as follows: "I regret that I appear to have no ancestors of that gifted people".

Having fought in the First World War, Tolkien wrote many letters during the Second World War to his son Christopher, including his reaction to the atomic bombing of Hiroshima, in which he calls the bombmakers of the Manhattan Project "lunatic" and "Babel builders".

I have what some might call an Atlantis complex. Possibly inherited, though my parents died too young for me to know such things about them, and too young to transfer such things by words. Inherited from me (I suppose) by one only of my children, though I did not know that about my son until recently, and he did not know it about me. I mean the terrible recurrent dream (beginning with memory) of the Great Wave, towering up, and coming in ineluctably over the trees and green fields. (I bequeathed it to Faramir.) I don't think I have had it since I wrote the "Downfall of Númenor" as the last of the legends of the First and Second Age.

— Letters, #163 to W. H. Auden, 7 June 1955

In 1951, Tolkien hoped that Collins would publish both The Lord of the Rings and a selection from his legendarium, including material that his son Christopher later edited to form The Silmarillion. To help persuade them that the two were "interdependent and indivisible", Tolkien sent a long letter (#131) to Milton Waldman of Collins, outlining the foundations and ambitions of his writings, and giving a potted history of the whole story from the creation, through the First, Second and Third Ages, and finishing with a reference to The Hobbit and a lengthy outline of The Lord of the Rings. (Note: The lengthy outline, omitted from the 1981 edition of Letters, has been published in The Lord of the Rings: A Reader's Companion. The letter has this and other omissions restored in the 2023 edition.) The Tolkien scholar Colin Duriez describes the 10,000-word letter as "one of the best keys to the extraordinary legendarium".

Other letters discuss subjects as widely varied as the location of Middle-earth ("the actual Old World of this planet", p. 220, #165), the shape of hobbits' ears ("only slightly pointed", #27) and the source of the "Downfall of Númenor" in Tolkien's recurring dream of Atlantis (#163).

== Publication history ==
The book was published in 1981 by Allen & Unwin in London. They reprinted it in 1990, 1995, and (having been taken over by HarperCollins) 2006. Houghton Mifflin published a paperback edition in Boston in 2000. A "Revised and Expanded Edition", adding materials that had previously been removed to cut down on length, was published in 2023. It contains 154 new letters and additional text that had been cut from 45 of the previously published letters. To preserve the original numbering scheme, new entries have been designated with an alphabetical indicator (e.g. '15a' for the first newly included letter written between numbers 15 and 16).

== Reception ==
=== 1981 edition ===
Hannu Hiilos, reviewing the book, echoes the editor's remark that the letters had been chosen from "a very large volume of material". He comments that Carpenter and Christopher Tolkien had attempted both to prioritise Tolkien's accounts of his Middle-earth writings, and to give a picture of the breadth of Tolkien's other interests and scholarship. In addition, he writes, Tolkien's views, coloured by his position on religion, morals, and politics, come across clearly in his wartime letters to Christopher.

The Tolkien scholar Douglas A. Anderson states that Carpenter "quietly withdrew from Tolkien scholarship" soon after publishing the Letters. Anderson states that he assisted Carpenter on Letters, "particularly with the headnotes and the annotations". The scholar of religion and of Tolkien's Middle-earth writings, Peter Kreeft, comments that the letters are important, since all Tolkien scholars have to start by noting their interpretations of Tolkien's writings, unless they "dare to assume" they know better than Tolkien did what he may have meant.

=== 2023 edition ===
The Tolkien Collector's Guide notes that the 2023 edition is essentially the text that Carpenter prepared for Allen & Unwin in 1979, only to find that the publishers felt it was too long. The result was that Carpenter and Christopher Tolkien cut it down by some 50,000 words, now restored. 154 letters appear in the 2023 edition for the first time, barring scholarly mentions and excerpts in The J. R. R. Tolkien Companion and Guide; another 45 letters have been revised, usually extended. The same website provides a guide to all the letters, including all those in the 2023 edition, as well as letters to or about Tolkien (which are not in any edition of the published book).

Joseph Loconte in The Wall Street Journal writes that the new edition offers "some revealing gems", but that "enthusiasts may be disappointed by what remains under lock and key."

== Sources ==
- Carpenter, Humphrey, ed. (2023) [1981]. The Letters of J. R. R. Tolkien: Revised and Expanded Edition. New York: HarperCollins. ISBN 978-0-35-865298-4.
