= J. R. R. Tolkien Encyclopedia =

Scholarly work by Michael D. C. Drout

J. R. R. Tolkien Encyclopedia: Scholarship and Critical Assessment
- Editor: Michael D. C. Drout
- Language: English
- Subject: J. R. R. Tolkien
- Publisher: Routledge
- Publication date: 2006
- Publication place: United States
- Media type: Hardcover
- Pages: 720
- ISBN: 978-0415969420
- OCLC: 71004244
- Dewey Decimal: 828/.91209 22
- LC Class: PR6039.O32 Z664 2007

The J. R. R. Tolkien Encyclopedia: Scholarship and Critical Assessment, edited by Michael D. C. Drout, was published by Routledge in 2006. A team of 127 Tolkien scholars on 720 pages cover topics of Tolkien's fiction, his academic works, his intellectual and spiritual influences, and his biography. Co-editors were Douglas A. Anderson, Verlyn Flieger (both Drout's co-editors also of Tolkien Studies), Marjorie Burns and Tom Shippey.

The development of the encyclopedia was interrupted by Taylor & Francis's takeover of Routledge. All the images and redirection entries (like "Balrog: see Monsters") were dropped, making the work less accessible than it could have been. Further, the editing process was severely curtailed, leaving many imperfections in the text. Reviewers noted the uneven handling of topics: some essays were excellent, while others were sketchy.

== Contents ==
Michael D. C. Drout's aim for this project, as stated in the book's introduction, was to make it appealing to a wide group of readers. The volume has over 125 contributors from a wide variety of countries. Entries discuss their concepts' connections with various of J. R. R. Tolkien's works, as well as related literary criticism and theory.

Themes covered by the essays include adaptations for cinema, stage, and television; art and illustrations; characters; critical history; influence; languages real and invented; biography; literary sources; literature; monsters, peoples, objects, and places of Middle-earth; reception; scholarship by Tolkien; stylistic elements; Tolkien's themes; theological and philosophical concepts; contemporary history and culture; and Tolkien's literary works.

== Reviews ==
Kelley Wickham-Crowley, reviewing the work, noted that the quality of the entries was very uneven, and that while some entries were written by experts and were highly interesting and informative, others were much less so; in his words, "the quality of entries can run the gamut from masterful to pedestrian". He wrote that "For characters in particular, entries that rehearse attributes and deeds suffer in comparison to more sophisticated analysis where we learn something or are graced with a perceptive insight or new direction of enquiry". Further, Wickham-Crowley suggested that a number of entries should have been merged. For example, some entries, like those on "Hobbits" and "Shire", repeat most of their corresponding content with few changes and should have likely ended up combined. Similarly, topics like "Environmentalism and Eco-Criticism" and "Environmentalist Readings of Tolkien" or "Comedy" and "Humor" may also not have warranted separate sections. Inclusion of some topics was rather surprising and arbitrary to Wickham-Crowley, for example the entries on "Thomas Aquinas" or "Law" (the latter focusing on theology instead of civil, or in-universe examples). In the end, Wickham-Crowley concluded, the level of contributors, and their contributions, varied significantly.

Wickham-Crowley attributed the failings of the work to insufficient copy editing, noting that it was "badly served" by Taylor & Francis's acquisition of Routledge, which, during the ensuing restructuring of its acquisitions, discontinued the Routledge encyclopedia division while this work was in production. This effectively led to the Tolkien Encyclopedia's publication being unfinished, a view endorsed by its chief editor, Michael D. C. Drout. The final volume is missing not only about a hundred planned illustrations—there are none in the printed work—but several entries were not properly proofed, and many errors were not corrected. Wickham-Crowley noted that while some entries were excellent, the work sports a "multitude of errors in word omission, grammar, spelling, spacing, word division, and bibliographic format [and other] embarrassing mistakes." In the end, Wickham-Crowley concluded that the project was ambitious, but execution was marred by the work's flaws.

As the encyclopedia's editor, Drout notes the "imperfections" on his website, describing the process of constructing it as "weird", and stating that when Taylor & Francis bought out Routledge, they cancelled many projects and closed the encyclopedia division. His project was luckily nearing completion so it was allowed to proceed. All the same, Drout writes, the proofs were "a hideous mess"; he marked up all the corrections he could, but became seriously ill (with pneumonia) and was unable to check the corrected text. He was "shocked" to find that the proofed articles were not sent to the article authors for them to approve. He thought "inexplicable" the decision to drop all the illustrations which Drout had gathered, and he was similarly bemused by the decision to cut all the redirection entries, like "Balrog: see Monsters" which contribute to making the encyclopedia useful and navigable, breaking a promise made to him.

Likewise, Jennifer Goodfellow in her review noted that the entries vary significantly, with some offering only a short summary of a topic, while others are much more in-depth. She noted that the organization of entries is not optimal, but concluded that the work was "an excellent resource for serious scholars of English literature as well as those with a general interest in Tolkien".

David Bratman noted the editing issues, adding that the result was highly uneven: there were many "tiny" entries, but all of Elvish linguistics was covered in a single "very long" section by Carl Hostetter, which Bratman found so much better that he wished the whole work had been done that way. John Garth, writing in the Times Literary Supplement, states that the encyclopedia "seethes with insight and opinion", benefiting from contributions by the major Tolkien scholars including Tom Shippey and Verlyn Flieger, while Drout's expertise in medievalism is visible in the many articles on that theme.

Tracy Carr in her short review of the work noted that it was intended more for Tolkien scholars than fans, as it aimed to engage more with real-world theories than describe the world Tolkien created. She concluded that the volume was "a suitable starting place" for "budding scholars" of Tolkien.

== See also ==
- The Lord of the Rings: A Reader's Companion
- The J. R. R. Tolkien Companion and Guide
