= Tolkien Studies =

Academic journal on J. R. R. Tolkien's works

- Discipline: Literature
- Language: English
- Edited by: Michael D. C. Drout, Verlyn Flieger, David Bratman

Publication details
- History: 2004–present
- Publisher: West Virginia University Press (United States)
- Frequency: Annual

Standard abbreviations
- ISO 4: Tolkien Stud.

Indexing
- ISSN: 1547-3155
- LCCN: 2003212563
- OCLC no.: 53302682

Links
- Journal homepage; Online access at Project MUSE

Tolkien Studies: An Annual Scholarly Review is an academic journal founded in 2004 publishing papers on the works of J. R. R. Tolkien. The journal's founding editors are Douglas A. Anderson, Michael D. C. Drout, and Verlyn Flieger, and the current editors are Drout, Flieger, and David Bratman. It states that it is the first scholarly journal published by an academic press in the area of Tolkien research (at least in the English language).

== Reception ==
The Tolkien scholar David Bratman wrote that in 2005, Tolkien Studies had "retrenched into Lord of the Rings studies", centred on Wayne G. Hammond and Christina Scull's The Lord of the Rings: A Reader's Companion, though it was accompanied by mythological and medieval studies of Tolkien's work.

In 2009, the Tolkien scholar Janet Brennan Croft wrote in Mythlore that "The continued and growing success of Tolkien Studies is a cheering indication that our narrow field of mythopoeic and Inklings studies is healthy enough to support two substantial and highly-respected refereed scholarly journals on the general topic in this country alone (Seven: An Anglo-American Review and Mythlore), as well as a number of specialized journals devoted even more narrowly to individual Inklings and fellow fantasists, like Tolkien Studies." She added that the journal was distinctive in "commissioning a lead article from a major Tolkien scholar, and following it up with an appreciation and/or checklist of their scholarship."

In 2010, Don Riggs reviewed Tolkien Studies Volume 6 for Journal of the Fantastic in the Arts, commenting that it contained essays, book reviews, a summary of the year 2006 in Tolkien studies, and a bibliography of the year 2007. He noted that the editors were major scholars in the field.

Mike Foster, writing in Mythlore in 2011 after seeing the first seven volumes of the journal, called Tolkien Studies "the best anthology of Tolkien criticism and commentary".

== See also ==
- Mythlore
