= Michael D. C. Drout =

American academic and writer

Michael Drout
- Born: May 3, 1968 (age 58)
- Education: Loyola University Chicago (PhD)
- Occupations: Literary critic and author
- Writing career
- Genres: Fantasy; Anglo-Saxon literature; Medieval literature; Science fiction
- Subject: Literature
- Website: michaeldrout.com

Michael D. C. Drout (/draʊt/; born 3 May 1968) is an American Professor of English and Director of the Center for the Study of the Medieval at Wheaton College. He is an author and editor specializing in Anglo-Saxon and medieval literature, science fiction and fantasy, especially the works of J. R. R. Tolkien and Ursula K. Le Guin.

== Career ==
Drout holds a PhD in English from Loyola University Chicago (May 1997), an MA in English from the University of Missouri (May 1993), an MA in Communication from Stanford University (May 1991), and a BA in Professional and Creative Writing from Carnegie Mellon University.

He is best known for his studies of J. R. R. Tolkien's scholarly work on Beowulf and the precursors and textual evolution of the essay Beowulf: the Monsters and the Critics, published as Beowulf and the Critics by J. R. R. Tolkien (2002), which won the Mythopoeic Award for Scholarship in Inklings Studies, 2003.

He is the editor of the J.R.R. Tolkien Encyclopedia: Scholarship and Critical Assessment (2007), a one-volume reference on Tolkien's works and their contexts.

With the Tolkien scholars Douglas Anderson and Verlyn Flieger, he is co-editor of Tolkien Studies, (Volumes 1–7, 2004–2010).

== Books ==
Books written or edited by Drout include:

- 2002, (editor), Beowulf and the Critics by J. R. R. Tolkien, Medieval and Renaissance Texts and Studies 248 (Arizona Center for Medieval and Renaissance Studies), Tempe, Arizone, ISBN 978-0-86698-290-0
- 2007, (editor), J. R. R. Tolkien Encyclopedia (New York; London: Routledge, 2007), ISBN 978-0415969420; reprinted 2013, ISBN 978-1135880347
- 2025, The Tower and the Ruin: J. R. R. Tolkien's Creation. (W. W. Norton & Company, 2025). ISBN 978-1324093886

== Audio ==
Drout has published thirteen audio lectures for Recorded Books' Modern Scholar Series. He has both a love of the Anglo-Saxon language, and academic expertise in its linguistic basis for the modern English Language; he maintains a growing collection of recorded Anglo-Saxon on Anglo-Saxon Aloud.
