= Christina Scull =

British researcher and writer (born 1942)

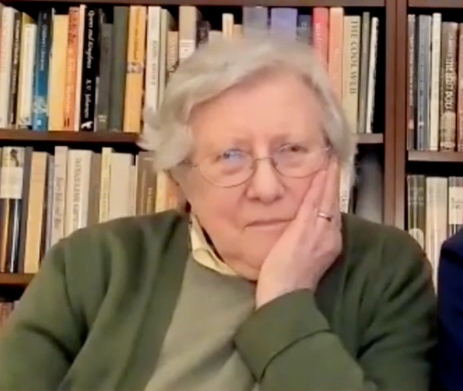
Scull in 2021

Christina Scull (born 6 March 1942 in Bristol, England) is a British researcher and writer best known for her books about the works of J. R. R. Tolkien, in collaboration with her husband Wayne G. Hammond who is also a Tolkien scholar. They have jointly won Mythopoeic Scholarship Awards for Inklings Studies five times.

== Biography ==
Christina Scull was born in Bristol and was educated at the Redmaids' High School there. She worked for the London Board of Trade from 1961 to 1971 while completing her Bachelor of Arts degree in art history and medieval history at Birkbeck College. From 1971 to 1995, she served as Librarian of the Sir John Soane's Museum in London. Tolkien's biographer John Garth describes Scull and Hammond as "two highly regarded veterans of Tolkien studies." She married the American Tolkien scholar Wayne G. Hammond in December 1994 and has collaborated with him on several projects.

== Awards and distinctions ==
Mythopoeic Scholarship Awards for Inklings Studies, all jointly with Hammond:

- 1996 for J. R. R. Tolkien: Artist and Illustrator
- 1999 for Roverandom
- 2000 for Farmer Giles of Ham
- 2006 for The Lord of the Rings: A Reader's Companion
- 2012 for The Art of the Hobbit by J. R. R. Tolkien

== Books ==
- 1991 The Soane Hogarths. Sir John Soane's Museum and Trefoil Publications.
- 1995 (with Wayne G. Hammond) J. R. R. Tolkien: Artist and Illustrator. Houghton Mifflin.
- 2005 (with Wayne G. Hammond) The Lord of the Rings: A Reader's Companion. Houghton Mifflin.
- 2006 (with Wayne G. Hammond) The Lord of the Rings 1954-2004: Scholarship in Honor of Richard E. Blackwelder. Marquette University Press.
- 2006 (with Wayne G. Hammond) The J. R. R. Tolkien Companion and Guide. Houghton Mifflin. Revised and expanded edition 2017.
- 2018 (with Catherine McIlwaine) Tolkien: Maker of Middle-earth. Bodleian Library.
- 2024 (with Wayne G. Hammond) The Collected Poems of J.R.R. Tolkien

== See also ==
- Tolkien research
- Middle-earth
