= Wayne G. Hammond =

American scholar (born 1953)

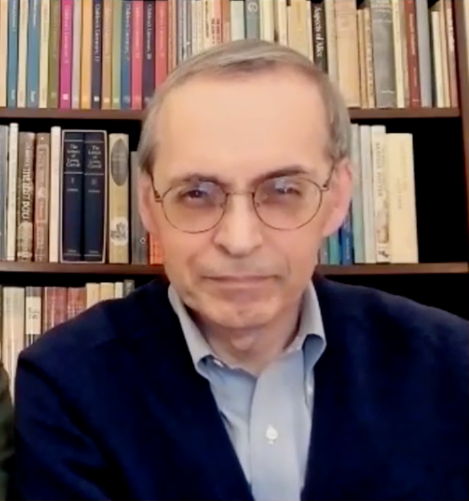
Hammond in 2021

Wayne Gordon Hammond (born February 11, 1953) is an American scholar known for his research and writings on the works of J. R. R. Tolkien. Together with his wife Christina Scull, a fellow Tolkien scholar, they have jointly won Mythopoeic Scholarship Awards for Inklings Studies five times.

== Biography ==
Wayne Hammond was born in Cleveland, Ohio, and then raised in Brooklyn, Ohio. He earned a Bachelor of Arts degree with Honors as an English major at Baldwin-Wallace College in 1975. He gained his Master of Arts degree in Library Science from the University of Michigan in 1976. From August 1976 to June 2015, he was Assistant Librarian of the Chapin Library of Rare Books at Williams College, and in July 2015 was promoted to Chapin Librarian.

In 1994, Hammond married fellow Tolkien scholar Christina Scull, and the two have since collaborated on several projects. John Garth describes Hammond and Scull as "two highly regarded veterans of Tolkien studies."

Their book J. R. R. Tolkien: Artist and Illustrator won the 1996 Mythopoeic Scholarship Award for Inklings Studies, one of five such awards that Hammond has won.

== Books ==
- 1982 The Graphic Art of C.B. Falls: An Introduction.
- 1993 J. R. R. Tolkien: A Descriptive Bibliography – with the assistance of Douglas A. Anderson
- 1995 (with Christina Scull) J. R. R. Tolkien: Artist and Illustrator. Houghton Mifflin.
- 2000 Arthur Ransome: A Bibliography.
- 2005 (with Christina Scull) The Lord of the Rings: A Reader's Companion. Houghton Mifflin.
- 2006 (with Christina Scull) The Lord of the Rings 1954-2004: Scholarship in Honor of Richard E. Blackwelder. Marquette University Press.
- 2006 (with Christina Scull) The J. R. R. Tolkien Companion and Guide. Houghton Mifflin. Revised and expanded edition 2017.
- 2024 (with Christina Scull) The Collected Poems of J.R.R. Tolkien

== See also ==
- Tolkien research
- Middle-earth
