= The Lord of the Rings: A Reader's Companion =

2005 book by Christina Scull and Wayne G. Hammond

- Cover of the first edition
- Author: Wayne G. Hammond and Christina Scull
- Cover artist: J. R. R. Tolkien
- Language: English
- Subject: The Lord of the Rings
- Genre: Non-fiction; Literary history; Literary analysis
- Publisher: HarperCollins (UK); Houghton Mifflin (US)
- Publication date: December 27, 2005
- Pages: 894 + lxxxii (hardcover); 976 (paperback)
- ISBN: 0-00-720308-X (UK hardcover); 0-00-720907-X ( UK paperback); 0-618-64267-6 (US hardcover)
- OCLC: 61687696
- Dewey Decimal: 823/.912 22
- LC Class: PR6039.O32 L6338 2005

The Lord of the Rings: A Reader's Companion (2005) is a nonfiction book by the scholars Wayne G. Hammond and Christina Scull. It is an annotated reference to J. R. R. Tolkien's heroic romance, The Lord of the Rings.

The Reader's Companion was designed to accompany the revised one-volume 50th anniversary edition of The Lord of the Rings (Houghton Mifflin, 2004; ISBN 0-618-51765-0). It is available in both hardcover and paperback, and not to be confused with Hammond and Scull's similarly named 2006 reference book The J. R. R. Tolkien Companion and Guide.

Scholars and critics have welcomed the book as providing inside information on the construction of The Lord of the Rings. In David Bratman's view, it succeeds admirably as an annotated edition. Laura Schmidt describes the existence of a single affordable volume with so much reference information as remarkable.

== Contents ==
Hammond and Scull proceed chapter-by-chapter from the original foreword through to the end of The Lord of the Rings. Appendices, examining the evolution of the text, changes, inconsistencies, and errors, often using comments from Tolkien's own notes and letters. Other sections cover the numerous maps of Middle-earth, chronologies of the story and its writing, and notes on the book and jacket design of the first editions of 1954–1955.

The book includes some previously unpublished material by Tolkien. It reprints part of a 1951 letter in which Tolkien explains, at some length, his conception and vision of The Lord of the Rings.

Reprinted for the first time since 1980, and corrected and expanded, is Tolkien's "Nomenclature of The Lord of the Rings" (previously referred to as "Guide to the Names in The Lord of the Rings"), an index of persons, places, and things designed to aid translators in rendering Tolkien's work into foreign languages.

== Reception ==
David Bratman, reviewing the work for Tolkien Studies, described it as "simply ... an Annotated Lord of the Rings that for reasons of space omits the text of the work being discussed", by contrast with Douglas A. Anderson's The Annotated Hobbit. He notes that the omission makes keying the notes to the text difficult: page numbers are given for the three-volume Allen and Unwin 1954-1955 edition, and the HarperCollins/Houghton Mifflin one-volume 2004 edition. Since many readers have neither of those, it also provides the first words of every cited paragraph, which in his view is at least workable. As an annotated edition, it succeeds "admirably", Bratman writes, in documenting many words and phrases "worthy of specific relevant commentary", and in providing a scholar capable of doing such a task justice. He notes that at 900 pages "of small type" it is similar in length to the text, while the comments range from brief glosses to "a five-page essay" on the Elf-lady Galadriel, which he calls "by itself a major essay on the subject".

Laura Schmidt, reviewing the book for VII, writes that the husband and wife scholarship team of Hammond and Scull offer inside information on how The Lord of the Rings was constructed through many stages, and assist with difficult passages. They note that although there are many other Tolkien references, having all the information in one affordable volume is "remarkable", and that it well complements Christopher Tolkien's 12-volume History of Middle-earth and the 50th anniversary edition of The Lord of the Rings.

== Awards ==
The Lord of the Rings: A Reader's Companion won the 2006 Mythopoeic Scholarship Award for Inklings Studies.

== Bibliography ==
- Hammond, Wayne G.; Scull, Christina (2005). The Lord of the Rings: A Reader's Companion. Houghton Mifflin Co. ISBN 978-0-00-720907-1.
