= The Lord of the Rings: The Fellowship of the Ring (video game) =

2002 video game

- North American cover art
- Developers: WXP (Xbox); Pocket Studios (GBA); Surreal Software (PS2, PC)
- Publisher: Black Label Games
- Director: Alan Patmore
- Producer: Nick Radovich
- Designer: Todd Clineschmidt
- Programmer: Tim Ebling
- Artist: Mike Nichols
- Composer: Brad Spear
- Platforms: Windows, Xbox, Game Boy Advance, PlayStation 2
- Release: September 24, 2002: Windows, Xbox, GBA; NA: September 24, 2002 (Xbox, GBA); NA: October 22, 2002 (PC); AU: November 7, 2002; EU: November 8, 2002 PlayStation 2; NA: October 15, 2002; AU: November 28, 2002; EU: December 6, 2002
- Genre: Action-adventure
- Mode: Single-player

The Lord of the Rings: The Fellowship of the Ring is a 2002 action-adventure game developed by WXP for the Xbox. Two additional versions were developed by Pocket Studios for Game Boy Advance and by Surreal Software for PlayStation 2 and Windows. The game was published by Vivendi Universal Games under their Black Label Games publishing label. In North America, it was released for Xbox and Game Boy Advance in September, and for PlayStation 2 and Windows in October. In Europe, it was released for Xbox, Windows and Game Boy Advance in November, and for PlayStation 2 in December.

The game is an officially licensed adaptation of J. R. R. Tolkien's 1954 novel, The Fellowship of the Ring, the first volume in his The Lord of the Rings. Although the game was released roughly a year after Peter Jackson's film The Lord of the Rings: The Fellowship of the Ring, and several weeks prior to his The Lord of the Rings: The Two Towers, it has no relationship with the film series. This is because, at the time, Vivendi, in partnership with Tolkien Enterprises, held the rights to the video game adaptations of Tolkien's literary works, whilst Electronic Arts held the rights to the video game adaptations of the New Line Cinema films. EA chose not to publish a game based on Jackson's Fellowship film, although they did incorporate some of the plot and footage into their 2002 Two Towers game, which was released a few weeks after Vivendi's Fellowship game.

The Fellowship of the Ring received mixed reviews, with critics praising the fidelity to the source material, but finding the combat rudimentary and repetitive, and the graphics poor. Many critics also compared the game's depiction of Middle-earth unfavorably with the darker depiction seen in the films. Although the game was a financial success, selling over one million units across all platforms, it was heavily outsold by EA's The Two Towers, which sold almost four million units. Vivendi initially planned to make two sequels to the game, covering all three books in the trilogy, but the first sequel, called The Lord of the Rings: The Treason of Isengard (a discarded title for Tolkien's Two Towers book), developed by Surreal Software and slated for release in late 2003, was cancelled late in development.

== Gameplay ==
The Lord of the Rings: The Fellowship of the Ring is an action-adventure game played from a third-person perspective. The player controls one of three characters at various points in the game: Frodo Baggins, Aragorn, and Gandalf, each of whom has their own weapons and abilities. Frodo is the only character who can jump, shimmy along ledges and sneak. Only Frodo and Gandalf can push and pull items. Gandalf is the only character who has access to magic and Aragorn is a more melee combat focused character.

Gameplay in the PlayStation 2 version of the game. Frodo Baggins fights Old Man Willow. His health meter is on the top left, his purity meter on the top right.

In combat, Frodo has access to a short sword. Frodo can turn invisible for limited periods of time by using the One Ring. Aragorn is armed with a longsword. Gandalf is armed with a sword and staff and has several magical abilities, such as chain lightning and healing.

When playing as Frodo, there are two meters on screen. One represents his health; the other represents his purity. As soon as Frodo puts on the One Ring, he begins to draw the gaze of Sauron, and his purity begins to diminish. If the purity meter empties before he takes the Ring off, he will become corrupted, and the game will end. Once he removes the Ring, the meter will begin to fill again. Gandalf also has two meters; health and magic spirit. As he uses magic, his spirit meter will begin to deplete. When it is empty, he can no longer cast spells. He can refill the meter by drinking miruvor. Aragorn has only one meter; his health bar.

The game features a number of collectible items. Often, they are quest items necessary for progressing in the story, but occasionally, the player can find health items; mushrooms for Frodo's health, cram bread and lembas for Aragorn and Gandalf, and miruvor for Gandalf's magic spirit. The Xbox version of the game features secret areas in many levels, where special items can be found. The Ring itself helps guide the player to these locations as its on screen image begins to rotate when a player is near such an area; the faster the rotation, the closer the player is to the secret location. The Xbox version also features numerous side-missions absent in the other versions of the game.

The Game Boy Advance version is different from the other three versions insofar as it is more RPG based, and is played from an isometric three-quarter top-down view. Gameplay focuses on turn-based combat, and at various points, all nine members of the fellowship (Frodo, Sam, Pippin, Merry, Aragorn, Gandalf, Legolas, Gimli and Boromir) are controllable, each with their own strengths, weaknesses and growth charts. During combat, the player has the choice to fully control each member of their active party (up to four characters), or instead, control only the main player character, and have the other three controlled by the AI.

== Synopsis ==
=== Background ===
The game is presented against the background of the history of the One Ring. At the dawn of the Second Age, after the defeat of the Dark Lord, Morgoth, the elves of Eregion forged the nineteen Rings of Power to help themselves, the dwarves and men rule Middle-earth. However, the elves were unaware that Sauron, Morgoth's closest ally, had survived his master's defeat, and in the guise of Annatar had been the one who taught the Elven-smiths, led by Celebrimbor, how to forge the Rings, whilst, in secret, he forged his own One Ring in the fires of Mount Doom, a Ring far more powerful than any of the others. However, in order for the One Ring to be powerful enough to control the other Rings, Sauron had to transfer most of his power into it. As soon as he put it on, the elves became aware of his ruse, removing and hiding their Three Rings, which Celebrimbor had forged without Sauron's aid. Sauron waged war on the elves, conquering much of Middle-earth and killing Celebrimbor. Thus began the Dark Years, when Sauron took possession of the remaining sixteen Rings, giving seven to the dwarves and nine to men in an effort to corrupt them. The dwarves proved relatively immune to the powers of the Rings, acquiring only a greed for gold, and becoming unconcerned with events in the wider world. Men proved less resilient, and the nine kings given the Rings become the nine Ring-wraiths, or Nazgûl, led by the Witch-king of Angmar.

In his ongoing efforts to conquer Middle-earth, Sauron regained the allegiance of many of Morgoth's servants from the First Age, and successfully corrupted Númenor. However, in doing so, he expended a great deal of his power, and lost the ability to ever again assume a pleasing disguise. Returning to Mordor, he regained his strength, eventually capturing Minas Ithil. However, realizing that if they did not join, Sauron would destroy both men and elves, Elendil, High-King of Arnor, and Gil-galad, High-King of Noldor, formed the Last Alliance of Men and Elves, and attacked Sauron in his fortress, Barad-dûr. The alliance was victorious, with Isildur cutting the One Ring from Sauron's hand. However, although presented with a chance to destroy the Ring forever, Isildur, already beginning to succumb to its corruption, chose not to do so. As such, although Sauron's physical form was vanquished, his spirit, bound to the Ring, survived. Some time later, Isildur was attacked and killed by a band of orcs, and the Ring was lost in the river Anduin for over two thousand years.

Meanwhile, during the Third Age, a still weakened Sauron covertly established a stronghold at Dol Guldur. In response to this undetermined evil, the Valar sent five Maiar to Middle-earth. Taking the form of wizards, they were led by Saruman. Unsure of the origin of the evil power in Dol Guldur, the wizard Gandalf was sent to investigate. However, Sauron hid from Gandalf, waiting for four hundred years before returning. Around the same time, the One Ring was found by a Hobbit named Sméagol, who became utterly corrupted by it, living in the caves of the Misty Mountains, and physically transforming into a creature known as Gollum. For five hundred years, Gollum was consumed and corrupted by the Ring. Eventually, Gandalf was able to determine the evil presence in Dol Guldur was indeed Sauron. Gandalf reported back to the White Council, but Saruman dissuaded them from moving against Sauron. Only when he learned the One Ring may be in the vicinity of the Gladden Fields did Saruman agree to attack Sauron, hoping to find the Ring himself. The Council drove Sauron from Dol Guldur, unaware that he knew the Ring had been found. Just prior to Sauron's departure, the Ring passed to another hobbit, Bilbo Baggins, who used it to assist in the victory of elves, men and dwarves at the Battle of the Five Armies. Sixty years later, Gollum was captured by orcs, and taken to Mordor, where he was tortured into revealing the owner and location of the Ring; Bilbo Baggins of the Shire. In the meantime, Bilbo had left the Shire to live in Rivendell, and upon the advice of Gandalf had (very reluctantly) given the Ring to his nephew, Frodo Baggins. With the information given him by Gollum, Sauron, still unable to take physical form, thus sent the Nazgûl to the Shire to retrieve the One Ring.

=== Plot ===
The game begins with Gandalf (voiced by Tom Kane) visiting Frodo (Steve Staley) and explaining the significance and history of the Ring. Frodo suggests it be destroyed, and Gandalf explains only the fires that created it are powerful enough to do so; the fires of Mount Doom, deep in Mordor. As Gandalf cannot take the Ring himself, for fear it would corrupt him, Frodo volunteers to do so. An eavesdropping Samwise Gamgee (voiced by Scott Menville in PC & PS2, but Cliff Broadway in Xbox) volunteers to join Frodo and Gandalf agrees, telling them they must head to Rivendell and speak to Elrond. He also tells Frodo never to use the Ring, as to do so will begin to corrupt him, and will draw the attention of Sauron and the Nazgûl. On the night of Frodo's departure, a Nazgûl arrives in The Shire looking for the Baggins' home. Frodo is able to evade the Nazgûl and heads to meet Sam, whom he finds accompanied by Peregrin "Pippin" Took (James Arnold Taylor) and Meriadoc "Merry" Brandybuck (Quinton Flynn). Much to Frodo's surprise they know about the Ring and Sauron, as they have been spying on Bilbo, Frodo and Gandalf for years. They vow to join Frodo on his quest.

With the Nazgûl in pursuit, the hobbits head through the Old Forest. As they reach a large willow tree, Sam, Pippin and Merry fall asleep, and are swept up into the tree's branches. Frodo is then approached by a man, Tom Bombadil (Daran Norris), who tells him the tree is called Old Man Willow. Tom puts Willow to sleep, and releases the hobbits. They go to his house, meeting his wife, Goldberry (Kath Soucie). The hobbits spend the night, before heading to the Barrow-downs, where Sam, Pippin and Merry are captured by a Barrow-wight. Tom arrives, again saving them, and leads them to Bree, advising them to stay in the Prancing Pony.

In the inn, Pippin has too much to drink and begins to tell stories about Bilbo. Afraid that he will reveal too much, Frodo climbs on a table and begins to sing and dance to distract the crowd. However, he slips, and the Ring lands on his finger, turning him invisible. An angry ranger takes the hobbits into another room, warning them they are drawing too much attention to themselves. He introduces himself as Strider (Daran Norris) and asks if he may join them on their journey. At this point, the innkeeper, Barliman Butterbur (Daran Norris), arrives with a letter from Gandalf which informs Frodo that Strider is really Aragorn, a trusted friend. Attracted by Frodo's accidental use of the Ring, the Nazgûl come to Bree, but Aragorn successfully hides the hobbits.

They head towards Rivendell, stopping at Weathertop for the night, where they are attacked by the Nazgûl. In an effort to evade them, Frodo puts on the Ring, not realizing it does not hide him from them. The Witch-king stabs him with a morgul-blade. Aragorn manages to fight off the attackers, but Frodo's blood is corrupted by evil. As they race to Rivendell, they are met by Glorfindel (Steve Staley), who gives Frodo his horse. Frodo crosses the River Bruinen, and the Nazgûl attempt to follow, but the waves of the river, under the control of Elrond, rise up, washing the Nazgûl away. At this point, Frodo faints.

He awakens to see Gandalf by his bedside. Gandalf tells him that Saruman has joined with Sauron, and that Aragorn is not just a ranger, but the last surviving descendant of Isildur, and rightful heir to the throne of Gondor. They head to the council chambers, where Elrond (Jim Piddock) is presiding over a debate about what to do with the Ring. Aragorn says the Ring must be destroyed, but Boromir (James Horan), a man from Minas Tirith, disagrees, arguing instead they should use it as a weapon against Sauron. Gandalf says this cannot be so, as anyone powerful enough to wield the Ring would become as terrifying as Sauron. As the debate becomes heated, Frodo volunteers to take the Ring to Mordor and cast it into the fires of Mount Doom, and Elrond agrees, forming a company of nine; Frodo, Sam, Pippin, Merry, Gandalf, Aragorn, Boromir, a silvan elf from Mirkwood named Legolas (Michael Reisz) and a dwarf from Erebor named Gimli (James Horan).

They set out, and attempt to cross Caradhras, but a snowstorm causes an avalanche, closing the pass. They reluctantly decide the only way past the Misty Mountains is to go under them, via the dwarven mines of Moria. In Moria, they fight off orcs as they pass through the chambers. Near the exit, they are attacked by a Balrog. Gandalf stands against it, defeating it by destroying the bridge on which it is standing. However, as it falls, it catches Gandalf with its whip, pulling him down after it. The distraught party leave Moria, entering Lothlórien, and meeting Galadriel (Jennifer Hale). She takes Frodo to see the Mirror of Galadriel, where he sees images of the coming War of the Ring. Frodo offers her the One Ring and although she is tempted, she turns it down, explaining that his resistance to its evil is because he has never tried to use it to control others.

The party leave Lothlórien via the river Anduin. Boromir tries to convince Frodo to take the Ring to Gondor to use it as a weapon against Sauron, but Frodo refuses. As they travel on the river, a Nazgûl riding a Fellbeast seizes Sam. The party give chase, and on the hill of Amon Hen, Aragon and Legolas slay the creature and rescue Sam. The game ends with Galadriel looking into her mirror, noting that although the Fellowship has succeeded in getting Frodo close to Mordor, she sees him and Sam alone in the future, with Gollum following closely behind them.

== Development ==
"We want to create an incredibly immersive, interactive and accurate representation of Middle-earth. Tolkien is very descriptive in his books, right down to the color of a leaf or the hair on a Hobbit's foot. That's both a blessing and a curse - it's great to have so much descriptive detail, but it also means we have to nail it or people will look at the game and say, "That's wrong." There's a huge responsibility to get this aspect of the game right, because I know there are fans out there who will count the number of stairs in Moria to make sure we got it right."

— Patrick Moynihan; WXP Games co-founder

On May 15, 2001, Vivendi Universal Interactive Publishing and Tolkien Enterprises announced an eight-year partnership for the publication of games based on The Lord of the Rings and The Hobbit. Under subsidiary Sierra On-Line, the first title planned as part of the deal would be based on The Fellowship of the Ring, developed by WXP Games, and that it would be an Xbox exclusive title, with some non-gameplay pre-rendered cutscenes to be made available at the upcoming E3 event.

Sierra were keen to emphasize the game would be based wholly on J. R. R. Tolkien's 1954 novel The Fellowship of the Ring, and would have no connection to the upcoming Peter Jackson directed film adaptation of the novel. This was because Vivendi Universal only owned the rights to video game adaptations of Tolkien's literary works, and not the rights to the New Line Cinema film series, which rival publisher Electronic Arts held. Sierra's Fellowship game was slated for release early in 2002, and was set to be followed by an adaptation of The Hobbit, and shortly thereafter, adaptations of The Two Towers and The Return of the King, and an as-yet untitled MMORPG set in Middle-earth.

Originally, WXP planned for The Fellowship to be an RPG, but they soon came to feel this might alienate potential players, and as they wanted to attract as many people as possible to the title, including people who had never read the books, they decided to develop the game as a third-person action-adventure instead. At the time, Frodo was the only controllable character, with the other members of the fellowship featuring as NPCs, although the player was to have the choice as to which character(s) to fight alongside at each point in the game. The developers were also working closely with Tolkien Enterprises to ensure any action sequences or enemies that moved beyond the immediate events of the novel kept with the general tone of the narrative and were true to the spirit of Tolkien's legendarium.

Discussing the technical aspects of developing the game for the Xbox, WXP co-founder, Patrick Moynihan stated

Our realtime lighting and character skinning systems are running on the GPU using vertex shaders. This allows for some really fast, beautiful lighting effects and smoothly blended character animations. Pixel shaders are being implemented to create special surface effects including some fantastic-looking water with real reflections and waves. The realtime shadows are coming along nicely, and we have some spectacular volumetric fog and particle system tools in place. All these technical features are working in harmony to create a stunningly beautiful representation of Middle-earth.

On December 21, Vivendi Universal announced a Game Boy Advance version of The Fellowship would also be released. Developed by Pocket Studios, the game was to be called Lord of the Rings, Part I, and was to feature the full plot of The Fellowship and roughly half of The Two Towers. This would be followed soon after by Lord of the Rings, Part II, featuring the second half of Two Towers and all of Return of the King. Vivendi revealed little about the games other than the fact that they were to be more RPG based than the Xbox Fellowship game, and would be played from an isometric three-quarter top-down view. By then, the publishing had transitioned from Sierra to VU Games' Universal Interactive division.

In February 2002, Vivendi Universal announced the Xbox version of the game would now feature three playable characters; Frodo, Aragorn and Gandalf, as well as multiple NPC allies and twenty-eight types of enemy. They also announced the release date had been pushed back to late 2002. Also in February, Vivendi revealed more about the GBA Lord of the Rings, Part I, explaining it would feature turn-based combat, and all nine members of the fellowship would be controllable at some point. During combat, the player would have the choice to fully control each member of their party, or instead, control only the main player character, and have their allies controlled by the AI.

"There's obviously a strong inherent fan base in place due to the massive popularity of the books. With the release of the Fellowship of the Ring movie, it's apparent that there is also a new generation of Tolkien fans who have emerged from that. Our aim is to immerse both the longtime fan of the novels and new Tolkien fans into Middle-earth. While the movie and its spin-off games are unable to cover all of the main key points found in the narrative, our game will contain them. Creating a game based on the actual narrative vs. a movie script means that the end result will be a much closer fit to the original. In other words, our game will give the complete story, true to the narrative, whereas the others may not."

— Todd Clineschmidt; Surreal Software lead designer

At E3 in May 2002, Vivendi Universal announced that the game would no longer be an Xbox exclusive, and would also be released for the PlayStation 2 and Windows. Both versions were being developed by Surreal Software. However, as with WXP's Xbox version, Surreal were working closely with Tolkien Enterprisers to ensure the game stayed within the parameters of Tolkien's fictional milieu. A non-playable E3 demo of the PlayStation 2 version featured combat from the Weathertop and Moria levels, showcasing the game's combat and graphics. The PlayStation 2 and PC versions used a modified form of the Riot Engine from Drakan: The Ancients' Gates. Also at E3, it was revealed the GBA Lord of the Rings, Part I had been renamed The Lord of the Rings: The Fellowship of the Ring, and would now cover only the first book. However, Vivendi emphasized how faithful an adaptation of the novel it was by showing footage of Tom Bombadil and Old Man Willow, characters usually cut from adaptations.

In June, Vivendi Universal continued to push the fidelity of the game on all platforms by revealing the voice actors would be reciting over 5000 lines of dialogue taken verbatim from the novel. They also explained that as in the novel it is mentioned there are 200 steps at the entrance to Moria, so in the game, there are exactly 200 steps. Previewing the PlayStation 2 version of the game, GameSpot's Gerald Villoria wrote "Although the game is by no means a replacement for reading the books, those who have only watched the movie should look forward to seeing a vision of Tolkien that lies much closer to home."

In August, Vivendi Universal formed a new publishing division called Black Label Games; a label which Ken Cron (Vivendi Universal Games CEO) stated "will focus on delivering innovative, high-quality titles to satisfy the growing consumer appetite for increasingly sophisticated content." With this, the game transitioned labels again from Universal Interactive to Black Label. The first playable versions of the game were shown at the ECTS in August, with the Weathertop level from both the PlayStation 2 and Xbox versions made available.

The competition between Vivendi's Fellowship and EA's Two Towers was spoken about by IGN's Douglass C. Perry, who wrote "the game looks to fulfill the dreams of diehard Tolkien fans who demand that their Tolkien be accurate to the books. The larger levels, various character changes, and attention to story detail will prompt buyers to weigh their decisions heavily before laying down their money on one or the other Tolkien games." In September, just prior to the release of The Fellowship, Vivendi reiterated that more Middle-earth games would be coming soon; the already in development The Hobbit, the two sequels to Fellowship (both of which would feature online multiplayer) and two newly announced games; The Lord of the Rings: Middle-earth Online and The Lord of the Rings: War of the Ring.

== Reception ==
Reception

Aggregate score
Aggregator	Score			
Aggregator	GBA	PC	PS2	Xbox
Metacritic	51/100	59/100	59/100	59/100

Review scores
Publication	Score			
Publication	GBA	PC	PS2	Xbox
Eurogamer				4/10
Game Informer			3/10	
GameSpot	2.1/10	5.7/10	5.5/10	5.7/10
GameSpy	1.5/5	2/5	1.5/5	3/5
GameZone			7.4/10	8/10
IGN	6/10	6.5/10	7.5/10	6.7/10
Nintendo Power	2.8/5			
Official U.S. PlayStation Magazine			3.5/5	
Official Xbox Magazine (US)				7/10
PC Gamer (US)		68%		

The Lord of the Rings: The Fellowship of the Ring was met with mixed reviews. The Game Boy Advance version holds an aggregate score of 51 out of 100 on Metacritic, based on eighteen reviews; the PC version 59 out of 100, based on sixteen reviews; the PlayStation 2 version 59 out of 100, based on nineteen reviews; and the Xbox version 59 out of 100, based on twenty-three reviews. In 2014, IGN included the game in their list of the "5 Worst Lord of the Rings Video Games."

GameZone's Michael Lafferty scored the Xbox version 8 out of 10, writing "the essence of the fantastic adventure is there, and while the game does chart an extremely linear path through the lands of Middle-earth, there are enough challenges along the route to enable players to joyfully experience the urgency and terror of the journey." IGN's Kaiser Hwang scored it 6.7 out of 10. He was critical of the combat, the enemy AI, and how the plot was handled. He concluded "the book itself is very non-linear in format and can be very hard to translate into an effective game without leaving some of the detail out. But to reduce to the story to almost childish levels is not what I had in mind. Didn't we learn that from 1978's Lord of the Rings animated movie?" GameSpy's Steve Steinberg scored it 3 out of 5, arguing "the actual gameplay takes a backseat. The die-hard Tolkien fan will get a kick out of slugging and spell-casting their way through the first book of the Rings trilogy, but the casual gamer will only be disappointed by an otherwise generic action/adventure title. GameSpot's Brad Shoemaker scored it 5.7 out of 10, writing "even the blessing of Tolkien Enterprises isn't enough to save the game from its bland design and tedious gameplay." He called it "an average game at its best and a frustrating and boring one at its worst." Eurogamer's Kristan Reed scored it 4 out of 10, comparing it unfavorably with EA's Two Towers; "EA shames Vivendi's effort for presentation and general slickness." He was heavily critical of the inability to invert the camera controls, which he referred to as an "industry standard option" in third-person games. He concluded "this has "licensed toss" written all over it. The goal was "to create the most authentic Lord of the Rings game experience possible." Quite honestly, Melbourne House's 1985 text adventure had more going for it."

IGN's Douglass C. Perry scored the PlayStation 2 version 7.5 out of 10, writing "the inclusion of chapters from the book skipped over in the movie, and the general variety of missions, spread out over the large landscapes work to its favor." However, he was critical of the lack of an autosave feature, the implementation of the Ring, which he felt was completely optional, and the combat system, which he called "basic and repetitive." He concluded "what this game has that the EA game doesn't have - chapters, characters and events from the book - is important to a Tolkien fan, and it warrants playtime [...] but without this license, this game is very, very average." GameZone's Michael Knudson scored it 7.4 out of 10 arguing "the game has a lot of potential, but a few gameplay quirks ruin it." He concluded "this game will only suit hardcore fans of the J.R.R. Tolkien series." GameSpot's Brad Shoemaker scored it 5.5 out of 10 calling it "an average adventure game with a high-profile license attached." GameSpy's Bryan Stratton scored it 1.5 out of 5, comparing it unfavorably with the film; "the reason that the movie worked was that Peter Jackson knew what to keep from the book, what to fast-forward through, and what to cut altogether. Fellowship doesn't have the benefit of so capable an editor." Game Informer's Andy McNamara scored it 3 out of 10, writing "There are so many things wrong with this one, it's hard to decide. For one, the story is delivered with all the emotion of a grade school play. This wouldn't be such a bad thing, if the gameplay weren't absolutely abysmal."

IGN's Steve Butts scored the PC version 6.5 out of 10, praising the game's fidelity to the novel and its inclusion of characters such as Tom Bombadil, but criticizing the truncation of the narrative, suggesting players unfamiliar with the book or film would not be able to follow the plot. However, he did argue "the artists here have done a really excellent job of creating a world that's similar enough to be familiar but distinct enough to stand on its own." GameSpot's Andrew Park scored it 5.7 out of 10, writing "thanks to Fellowship of the Ring's limited gameplay, only true Tolkien enthusiasts will enjoy the game for very long." He concluded "the game generally looks and sounds quite good, but unfortunately, it just isn't that much fun to play." GameSpy's Avi Fryman scored it 2 out of 5, and was critical of the gameplay, controls, camera and the lack of an autosave, although he did praise the graphics and voice acting.

The Game Boy Advance version was generally considered the weakest version of the game. IGN's Marc Nix scored it 6 out of 10, and was especially critical of the combat; "enemies get the jump on you with the first attack, and since there can be several enemies on screen, it can take a long time for your turn to come up. Then you have to watch every swipe of battle, which all begin and end with the characters taking a LONG walk across the screen to attack and then retreat - just the time that it takes for sprites to rotate back into the ready position is enough time for you to lose interest." He called the game "a rough start for the journey." GameSpy's Avi Fryman scored it 1.5 out of 5, criticizing the graphics, and finding the game buggy, writing "I wonder if it was even tested prior to its clearly rushed release." GameSpot's Frank Provo scored it 2.1 out of 10, writing, "the range of interactivity is so low and the action is so infrequent that Frodo's quest to Mount Doom is reduced to nothing more than a trivial errand. What's more, the entire game is so unpolished and full of bugs that it's unfathomable how it ever passed quality assurance in the first place." GameSpot later The Fellowship of the Ring for its annual "Worst Game on Game Boy Advance" award.

=== Sales ===
The game sold over one million units across all platforms and was a commercial success. However, it was heavily outsold by EA's The Two Towers game, which sold almost four million units and received considerably better reviews. In the United States, the computer version of The Fellowship of the Ring sold 230,000 copies and earned $7.8 million by August 2006, after its release in October 2002. It was the country's 91st best-selling computer game during this period.

== Cancelled sequels ==
Although the planned Hobbit game, Middle-earth Online and War of the Ring were all ultimately released, the two sequels in the Lords of the Rings trilogy were not. The first game, an adaptation of The Two Towers, was renamed The Lord of the Rings: The Treason of Isengard (a discarded title for the original Two Towers novel), so as not to cause confusion with EA's 2002 Two Towers game. Treason was first announced on April 24, 2003, with plans for a non-playable demo at E3 in May. The game was being developed by Surreal Software, who had handled the PlayStation 2 and PC versions of The Fellowship. Vivendi planned to release the game under the Black Label Games banner on Xbox and PS2, which had seen the highest sales of the Fellowship game. Vivendi also hired Daniel Greenberg, a self-professed Tolkien fanatic, to work on the game.

At E3, a non-playable demo was shown. Following the mediocre critical reaction to Fellowship, Surreal had built a new game engine from scratch. Additionally, the rigidly linear gameplay from Fellowship was replaced with a mixture of both linear and non-linear levels. Vivendi also announced that a secret playable character could be unlocked in the game, but only if the player performed very specific actions. They refused to say who the character was. The demo featured a level set in Fangorn Forest, with Aragorn, Legolas and Gimli fighting a group of orcs. In total, apart from the secret character, the game was to feature six playable characters; Aragorn, Gimli, Legolas, Boromir (in a flashback level), Frodo and Gandalf. Another new feature in the game was that the player-character often switched mid-level, adhering to the main point-of-view of the given moment in the novel. Multiplayer co-op was also available, and online multiplayer was said to be in the works. The character models were not the same as those used in The Fellowship, with considerably more detail for each character. In July, Vivendi revealed that Treebeard had been added as a playable character.

However, on September 12, Vivendi announced that both The Treason of Isengard and the Return of the King games had been cancelled. The official reason given by Vivendi was that Treason "was not shaping up as strongly as anticipated and would likely not satisfy the expectations of Tolkien fans." Vivendi reiterated that The Hobbit, Middle-earth Online and War of the Ring were all still on schedule. Andrew Shiozaki, senior brand manager of Vivendi Universal Games, commented that "it was determined that The Lord of the Rings: The Treason of Isengard was not going to achieve the strict, but crucial, standards for our Tolkien games. With that, the decision has been made to cancel this title and focus on the remainder of the Tolkien lineup." The game had been slated for a November 2003 release, and upon its cancellation, Surreal declined to comment.
