= Tolkien's ambiguity =

Literary device in Tolkien's fiction

Tolkien's ambiguity, in his Middle-earth fiction, in his literary analysis of fantasy, and in his personal statements about his fantasy, has attracted the attention of critics, who have drawn conflicting conclusions about his intentions and the quality of his work, and of scholars, who have examined the nature of that ambiguity.

In The Lord of the Rings, Tolkien is carefully ambiguous in diction and in descriptions. These often seem quite concrete, but scholars such as Steve Walker and Nils Ivar Agøy have noted that he leaves wide freedom for the reader to imagine different aspects of Middle-earth, balancing psychological reality against the possibilities of fantasy, and leaving quite vague his descriptions of characters and landscapes. Others, like Catherine Madsen and Verlyn Flieger, consider the way that The Lord of the Rings is at once pagan and Christian, as events arise seemingly naturally but carrying a moral message. Tom Shippey notes that Tolkien made equivocal statements about fantasy, such as in his essay "On Fairy-Stories". Tolkien was similarly equivocal about the nature of evil, as seen through the One Ring, created by the Dark Lord Sauron to dominate the whole of Middle-earth; it behaves both as an inanimate object, and as a thing with constantly evil intent, seeking to enslave whoever bears it. Shippey admired Tolkien's ability to balance between pagan and Christian worlds through literary skill and suggestion.

Tolkien uses punning names to introduce ambiguity, as when a name like Mordor hints at murder. The name Orthanc, uniquely, is explicitly stated to be a bilingual pun between Sindarin ("Mount Fang") and Rohirric ("cunning mind") – which is its real-world meaning in Old English. Other double meanings are introduced around important concepts, as when Frodo nears the Cracks of Doom, he speaks in "a cracked whisper". In addition, he interchanges the name Old Man Willow, suggesting a sentient character, with the description "old Willow-man", leaving open whether this is a tree-like man or a man-like tree, and how different or similar he may be to the rest of the trees in the Old Forest.

A film adaptation inevitably reduces the complexity and ambiguity of a narrative, not least because any object described has to be represented in just one way. The fact that Peter Jackson's film version chooses to emphasize the metaphor of a journey further simplifies the presentation. On the other hand, music is, like text, inherently ambiguous, and a work like Johan de Meij's 1989 Symphony No. 1 "The Lord of the Rings" can in its way preserve some of the ambiguity of Tolkien's narrative.

== Context ==
J. R. R. Tolkien was an English author and philologist of ancient Germanic languages, specialising in Old English; he spent much of his career as a professor at the University of Oxford. He is best known for his novels about his invented Middle-earth, The Hobbit and The Lord of the Rings, and for the posthumously published The Silmarillion which provides a more mythical narrative about earlier ages. A devout Roman Catholic, he described The Lord of the Rings as "a fundamentally religious and Catholic work", rich in Christian symbolism. (Note: Carpenter 2023, letter 142 to Robert Murray, 2 December 1953)

== Freedom for the reader ==
Tolkien left wide freedom for the reader to imagine different aspects of Middle-earth, such as through his diction, his balancing of psychological reality against the possibilities of fantasy, and the vagueness of his descriptions of characters and landscapes.

=== Ambiguous diction ===
Boromir, wondering what exactly Galadriel had been doing with her mirror (emphases added)

'To me it seemed exceedingly strange', said Boromir. 'Maybe it was only a test, and she thought to read our thoughts for her own good purpose; but almost I should have said that she was tempting us, and offering what she pretended to have the power to give. It need not be said that I refused to listen. The Men of Minas Tirith are true to their word.' But what he thought that the Lady had offered him Boromir did not tell.

— The Lord of the Rings, book 2, ch. 7 "The Mirror of Galadriel" (Note: Tolkien 1954a, book 2, ch. 7 "The Mirror of Galadriel")

The scholar of English literature Steve Walker states that Tolkien's prose leaves ample freedom for the reader through its ceaseless ambiguity in many dimensions, such as in diction, in balancing psychological reality against "imaginative possibility", in description of characters and landscape, in tone, between past and present, and between the ordinariness and almost pantheistic animation of nature.

Tolkien deliberately introduces ambiguity in many places with words of various parts of speech – including adjectives, verbs, and nouns – that hint at uncertainty, strangeness, or chance.

Steve Walker's analysis of Tolkien's ambiguous diction
Part of speech	Examples	Function
Verb	imagined, believed, half fancied, seemed, suspected, wondered	Actively introduce ambiguity
Adjective	curious, odd, queer, strange, unnatural	Qualify ordinary nouns, "tending to objectify the supernatural even as they imply mystery in the natural"
Abstract noun	chance, fortune, luck	"Complicate [the] significance" of "plotted coincidences" with ambiguity between luck and fate

In his tone, Tolkien achieves an ambiguous balance by offering alternative views or opinions, such as when the Elves Galadriel and Celeborn meet the ancient Ent Treebeard near the end of the book.

Steve Walker's analysis of Tolkien's ambivalent tone in one conversation
Character	Statement in The Return of the King (Note: Tolkien 1955, book 6, ch. 6 "Many Partings")	Tone
Treebeard	"It is sad that we should meet only thus at the ending. For the world is changing: I feel it in the water, I feel it in the earth, and I smell it in the air. I do not think we shall meet again."	"reluctantly pessimistic"
Celeborn	"I do not know, Eldest."	"abstaining"
Galadriel	"Not in Middle-earth, nor until the lands that lie under the wave are lifted up again. Then in the willow-meads of Tasarinan we may meet in the spring."	"hesitantly hopeful"

=== Ambiguous description ===
Tolkien's description of Frodo after meeting the Elves,
discussed by scholars

In the morning Frodo woke refreshed. He was lying in a bower made by a living tree with branches laced and drooping to the ground; his bed was of fern and grass, deep and soft and strangely fragrant. The sun was shining through the fluttering leaves, which were still green upon the tree. He jumped up and went out.

— The Lord of the Rings, book 1, ch. 4 "A Short Cut to Mushrooms" (Note: Tolkien 1954a, book 1, ch. 4 "A Short Cut to Mushrooms")

Some of Tolkien's critics, like the Beowulf translator Burton Raffel, have been in two minds about The Lord of the Rings. Raffel liked the book, but in the words of the historian and Tolkien scholar Nils Ivar Agøy "reached the weird conclusion that it was 'not literature'." Taking the passage describing Frodo's awakening after meeting the Elf Gildor Inglorion, Raffel calls the prose "brilliantly adequate, straightforward, just starched enough to have body, resilient enough to catch the echoes of speech, not a super-charged instrument, nor one with great range, but very competent". Agøy describes Raffel as being "in two minds" on Tolkien's descriptive powers. Raffel wanted Tolkien's descriptions to be precise, with "particular objects in particular relationships with the characters", and without all the ambiguity and uncertainty that Tolkien had created. Agøy contrasts Raffel's reaction with Walker's, noting that Walker describes Tolkien's prose as "sensuous, the landscape tangible". He adds that Walker also states that Tolkien's writing is not as specific as the impression that it gives: his writing is, he argues, somewhat generalized (with archetypes in place of individual characters), causing critics like Raffel to react against the book. Tolkien's ambiguity further explains why The Lord of the Rings has been seen in so many different ways.

Agøy finds that while Tolkien does sometimes describe people, places, and objects such as utensils, swords, and staves, he just as often makes the descriptions "general ... almost generic", leaving plenty of room for the reader's imagination: "If we see cosy Bag End in vivid color and high definition, the colors and details are added by us, the readers, to a framework provided by Tolkien." Agøy adds that in his essay On Fairy-Stories, Tolkien states in a footnote (Note E) that "illustrations do little good to fairy-stories", since "every hearer of the words will have his own picture" of what a piece of bread, a hill, or a river is like. Accordingly, Agøy summarizes Tolkien's view as being that authors should "not unnecessarily constrain the reader's 'own picture'", in other words favouring "quite vague descriptions."

Tolkien took care, too, to choose ambiguous titles, so as not to give away too much of the story. (Note: Carpenter 2023, #140 to Allen & Unwin, August 1953) When his publishers decided to bring out The Lord of the Rings in three volumes, rather than six books as Tolkien had hoped, he stated in a letter that "I prefer for Vol. III The War of the Ring, since it gets in the Ring again; and also is more noncommittal, and gives less hint about the turn of the story: the chapter titles have been chosen also to give away as little as possible in advance."

Tolkien's ambiguity may fit into a wider pattern of unknowing. Benjamin Blakeslee-Drain describes this in Mythlore as elements that "suggest ... unreliability or incompleteness ... including the unknown, the unsaid, the forgotten, the distanced, the fallible, the biased, the hinted at, the varied, and the contradicted." These serve both to allow readers space to use their imagination, and to express Tolkien's "most profound moral statements." Blakeslee-Drain proposes that such unknowing matches an Elvish tradition of unreliability, and a biblical tradition of unknowing, as in the Book of Job.

== Pagan and Christian ==
=== Echoes of Christianity ===
Catherine Madsen, writing in Mythlore, describes the contradictory quality of The Lord of the Rings, "religion without revelation", in which "all triumphs are mixed: every victory over evil is also a depletion of the good." She sees "echoes" of Christian imagery in the book, but "precisely not witnesses to the Gospel", arguing that if Elbereth recalls the Virgin Mary, it is her "starriness that crosses over into Faerie, not her miraculous motherhood or her perpetual virginity." Tolkien had in Madsen's view a strong allegiance both to Christianity and to the "laws and form of the fairy-story". She argues that he wanted to show "a world on its own terms" where "both catastrophe and eucatastrophe developed from natural facts, because these carry a weight which the supernatural cannot."

Matthew Thompson-Handell, in his 2025 paper in Mythlore, "No Ragnarök, No Armageddon", reviews early Tolkien criticism, from 1972 to 1981 when The Letters of J. R. R. Tolkien was published, reducing some of the apparent ambiguity. He analyses the writings of scholars such as Paul Kocher and Randel Helms, who took up either a Christian or a Pagan interpretation of Middle-earth. In his view, the work is ambiguous rather than actually contradictory, so he supports Flieger's 2014 view of the inherent theological "ambiguity and indeterminacy" of The Lord of the Rings, rather than her 2019 position which asserts a balancing of inbuilt contradictions.

=== Moral ambiguity ===
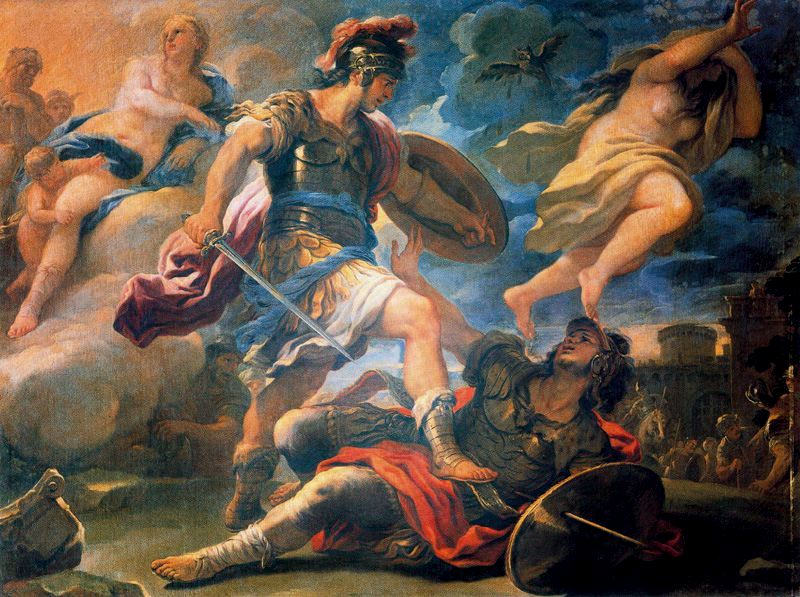
Tolkien's Cracks of Doom scene has been likened to "Aeneas' morally ambiguous killing of Turnus". 17th century painting by Luca Giordano

Madsen notes that the book's Cracks of Doom scene where Frodo and Gollum struggle for the One Ring is deeply ambiguous in its morality; far from some simple good triumphing over evil, good "depends on evil to deliver it." The classicist J. K. Newman agrees that this climactic scene has a moral ambiguity about it, likening it in Classical terms to "Aeneas' morally ambiguous killing of Turnus" at the end of Virgil's Aeneid.

=== Imagination and orthodoxy ===
The Tolkien scholar Verlyn Flieger writes in her 2014 paper "But What Did He Really Mean?" that The Lord of the Rings has constantly attracted conflicting analyses, such as those of neo-pagans and evangelical Christians. Tolkien replied ambiguously to questions, or gave conflicting statements of his own view. Flieger states that he adjusted his explanations of his work to best suit his audience, noting that the book offers "richness and multivalent texture", enabling every reader to take what they personally need and want. In her view, Tolkien was trying to "harmonize his work's originality and his own imagination with Christian orthodoxy, and to situate his often unorthodox views within the narrower confines of his religion without abandoning either." Flieger quotes Judith Thurman's remark that "A coherent personality aspires, like a work of art, to contain its conflicts without resolving them dogmatically", stating that Tolkien had the advantage of being inclusive enough to achieve this. Flieger ends by stating that the book is "not a story about good and evil but a story about how good can become evil, a story whose strength lies in the tension created by deliberately unresolved situations and conflicts... [tapping] into that 'reservoir of power' below the visible world."

In 2019, Flieger revisited the theme in her paper "The Arch and the Keystone", writing that just as a keystone prevents an arch from falling, holding it together precisely because there are opposing forces acting upon it, so the power of The Lord of the Rings, and of Tolkien himself, should be seen as depending on those contradictions.

== Hinting at evil ==
=== Metaphors and metonyms ===
The Lidless Eye, a metonym for the Dark Lord Sauron, an embodiment of evil power in The Lord of the Rings

The linguist Joanna Podhorodecka writes that Tolkien revives numerous familiar and seemingly linguistically dead metaphors for evil in the book, ambiguously treating them both as familiar phrases, and hinting that they are (perhaps) literally true of the shadowy presences such as the Dark Lord Sauron and his deadly servants, the Nazgûl or ringwraiths, that he is describing. Among Tolkien's metaphors are the Lidless Eye, the symbol of the evil land of Mordor, metonymic for Sauron; the hand, stretching out to control; and shadow, denoting Sauron's power.

=== Evil: nothing, or powerful ===
The Tolkien scholar Tom Shippey comments that shadow is "Tolkien's distinctive image of evil". Podhorodecka adds that describing evil as dark is inherently ambiguous, as this could mean simple absence of light, or "the Unlight", an actual and substantial enemy. Tolkien's ambiguous account of evil is "an attempt to reconcile two views", which Shippey describes as "both old, both authoritative, both living, each seemingly contradicted by the other." These are the Boethian view that evil is nothing, it does not exist but is the absence of good; and the opposing view, tending towards the Manichaean, that evil is equal and opposite to good, and ceaselessly battles against it. Thus, Shippey notes, Frodo states the Boethian view directly while he is in Mordor: "the Shadow ... can only mock, it cannot make: not real things of its own"; (Note: Tolkien 1955, book 6, ch. 1 "The Tower of Cirith Ungol") similarly, he writes, the Ent Treebeard states that "Trolls are only counterfeits, made by the Enemy ... in mockery of Ents, as Orcs were of Elves". (Note: Tolkien 1954, book 3, ch. 4 "Treebeard") But, Shippey writes, evil felt real enough during the Second World War and the Holocaust when Tolkien was writing. So, Shippey argues, the Ring behaves inconsistently, being both an inanimate object and definitely evil, since it "betrayed" Isildur to his death, "abandoned" Gollum when it had no more use for him, and in Frodo's words "perhaps it had tried to reveal itself in response to some wish or command that was felt in the room" (Note: Tolkien 1954a, book 1, ch. 9 "At the Sign of the Prancing Pony") in the Prancing Pony inn at Bree, when the Ring advertises its presence to the watching spies by slipping itself onto Frodo's finger, making him suddenly invisible.

== Punning on second meanings ==
The name Avallonë, a city on the island of Tol Eressëa close to the Undying Lands of Valinor, recalls the name of the magical Arthurian island of Avalon.

=== Bilingual puns ===
Pierre H. Berube suggests in Mythlore that Tolkien used punning names to hint at their meaning in a second language, such as English or Greek. He comments that Mordor and Númenor weakly suggest the verbal associations "murder" and "numinous". More strongly, he notes that Avallonë and Atalantë remind readers of the Arthurian Avalon and Plato's Atlantis; the latter was acknowledged by Tolkien as a happy coincidence.

The name of the tower of Orthanc is unique in that it is explicitly stated to be a bilingual pun in The Two Towers: Tolkien gives the two meanings as "Mount Fang" in Elvish (Sindarin), and "Cunning Mind" in the "language of the Mark of Old". Tolkien had chosen to represent Rohirric, the language of Rohan/the Mark as Old English, where orþanc means "intelligence, understanding, mind; cleverness, skill; skilful work, mechanical art" as a noun, and "ingenious, skilful" as an adjective. Tolkien was thus admitting that he was using Old English to represent Rohirric.

A different case was Beleriand, which Tolkien had earlier named Broceliande, another Arthurian reference, this time to the magical forest Brocéliande. Since Tolkien had dropped that, Berube suggests that he wanted to find a different allusion, and chose the obscure Belerion as his target. This was the name given to Cornwall, or perhaps more specifically to the tin-mining region near Land's End, by the traveller Pytheas of Massalia in around 240 BC. Berube comments that few readers can have made this association. One pun that Tolkien dropped, fortunately in Berube's view, was "Gnome" for the Noldor, a group of Elves distinguished by their knowledge and skill; the intended association was with "gnosis", from the Greek, meaning "knowing"; but Tolkien was persuaded not to use the name because of its trivial popular usage.

=== Building double meanings ===
Walker writes that Tolkien weaves elaborate double meanings "into the essential texture of the prose". Some of these are explicit, like Aragorn's epithet "Estel" which is stated to mean "Hope"; Tolkien then freely puns on this in a sustained way throughout the novel with phrases like "hope dwelt ever in the depths of his heart" or that by his efforts "hope beyond hope was fulfilled". Other cases are lighter, as when the Elvish boats (craft) given to the Fellowship are called "crafty", meaning "clever as well as seaworthy", or when the evil battering-ram Grond is wound about with "spells of ruin" which, Walker suggests, are "both ruinous and runic".

Further, Walker states, much of Tolkien's punning attends so closely to the situation that his diction could be called mimetic, painting a word-picture of whatever is happening. When describing the evil Old Man Willow, the words become treelike: his heart is called "rotten", his strength "green", his wisdom "rooted".

Steve Walker's analysis of some of Tolkien's mimetic puns
Situation	Tolkien's mimetic phrase	Comments
Discussing the Prancing Pony inn	"My people ride out there now and again"	"Lively semantic horseplay"
Dwarves fearing to be eaten by Trolls	"[We are in] a nice pickle"	Stock phrase "to be in a [pretty] pickle"
Nearing the Cracks of Doom	Frodo talks in "a cracked whisper"	Stock phrase "the crack of doom"
Goldberry addresses the Ring-bearer, Frodo	"I see you are an elf-friend, ... the ring in your voice tells it"	Play on homonyms

== Balance between subcreation and underlying reality ==
=== Equivocating about fantasy ===
Shippey writes that Tolkien made multiple equivocal statements about fantasy itself, both in "On Fairy-Stories" and in his poem "Mythopoeia". In Shippey's view, Tolkien was expressing his conviction that "fantasy is not entirely made up", but was at once what Tolkien called "the Sub-creative art in itself" and "derived from the Image", existing like Tolkien's beloved Old English words before any philologist (such as Tolkien himself) began to study them. So Tolkien was skilful enough to be able to "balance exactly between 'dragon-as-simple-beast' and 'dragon-as-just-allegory', between pagan and Christian worlds", giving just a suggestion of myth.

=== Some degree of sentience ===
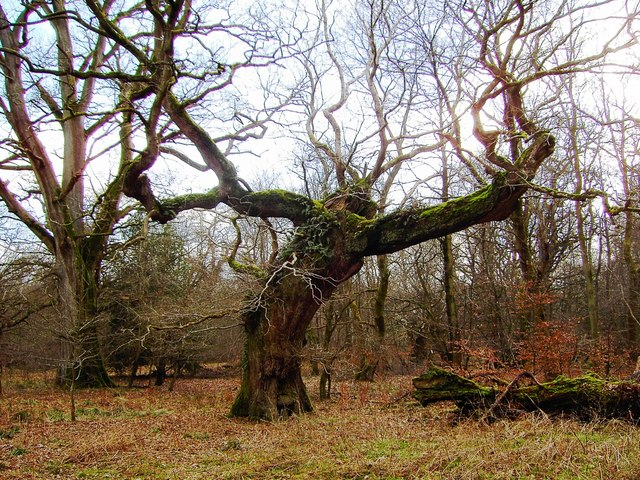
Tolkien never makes it quite clear how close to sentient the trees in the Old Forest may be.

Cynthia Cohen, writing in Tolkien Studies, comments that Tolkien is steadily ambiguous about an Old Forest character, Old Man Willow/"old Willow-man", interchanging the two terms, and so hinting that he might be "a tree-like man, a man-like tree, or something in between." She writes that Tolkien is equally vague about the difference between Old Man Willow and the rest of the trees in the Old Forest; they may just be trees but who are somewhat sentient, as they are "under its dominion" (though Frodo refers to Old Willow Man as "he" not "it") and watch the intruding Hobbits with hostile "emotion and intent", indeed seeming to have a "vindictive will". (Note: Tolkien 1954a, book 1, ch. 6 "The Old Forest")

Tolkien's trees range from being simple, natural, primary world plants through to fully-sentient and mobile Ents, with Huorns (who can be stirred up to walk by the Ents) and Old Forest trees in between. Cohen comments that Tolkien carefully crafts an account that preserves "the inner consistency of reality", moving from vague feelings about "queer" trees through to progressively more sentient and hostile beings as the Hobbits travel deeper into the Old Forest. Cohen notes Tolkien's use of phrases that indicate ordinariness as well as the Hobbits' feelings of discomfort: "It seemed [her italics] that the trees became taller, darker, and thicker"; they had "writhing and interlacing roots", which might be familiar metaphors for real-world trees, or might be a literal account of dangerous and threatening beings.

== In adaptations ==
=== Lost ambiguity in film ===
The flaming of the stars on Aragorn's battle standard can be imagined in many ways by a reader, but anyone presenting the standard in a film has to choose just one appearance for it.

Scholars such as Michael D. C. Drout and Estelle R. Jorgensen state that Peter Jackson's film adaptation of The Lord of the Rings reduces the complexity and ambiguity inherent in Tolkien's story.

Drout writes that even the most detailed prose description inherently retains "a certain ambiguity". He gives as an example the long sentence detailing the symbols on Aragorn's battle standard, commenting that no film director can hope to preserve the ambiguity of a statement like "And the stars flamed in the sunlight, for they were wrought of gems by Arwen daughter of Elrond". Drout states that the director has to "choose which gems (which colors, what kind of faceting, etc.) and arrange them in some way." Thus, Drout concludes, even a director who was trying to represent a book literally would reduce or eliminate the text's ambiguity.

In Jorgensen's view, one of Tolkien's many metaphors, that of the journey, takes over as "the single and definitive idea" in the film. The drawings by Jackson's conceptual artists Alan Lee and John Howe, along with Richard Taylor's costume and set designs, drove Jackson's visual presentation, creating an "authoritative" picture of the story. The film version, Jorgensen writes, "becomes one version of what ... might be multiple imagined versions", overriding viewers' own ways of seeing the story.

=== Ambiguity preserved or lost in music ===
A musical adaptation may in Jorgensen's view be better able to preserve Tolkien's ambiguity better, generating the sort of wonder that could match the feelings evoked by Tolkien's mythic narrative. She writes that music may hint at the story's "transcendence, profundity, ambiguity, narrativity, and an aesthetic and didactic character that arouse awe, mystery, and a heightened sense of the human condition."

Johan de Meij's 1989 Symphony No. 1 "The Lord of the Rings" is programmatic (with movements explicitly named "The Mines of Moria" and "The Bridge of Khazad-Dûm"), but Jorgensen suggests that "music's very ambiguity suggests an array of possible other scenarios that listeners, without intimate knowledge of the program [of de Meij's symphony] (or even with it) might construct for themselves."

Howard Shore's music for The Lord of the Rings film series, however, is "pervasively orchestral and tonal", and Tolkien's songs for the Hobbits and for the Elf-lady Galadriel are missing. Instead, Shore uses leitmotifs representing the various cultures depicted, such as the Shire for the Hobbits. The result, in Jorgensen's opinion, is that the music "is swallowed up by sight", as viewers pay attention to the films' unambiguous visible action. The absence of Tolkien's poetry, and the visual nature of film, make it reliant on the concrete details, which make it less ambiguous than the novels.

== Sources ==
- Agøy, Nils Ivar (2013). "Vague or Vivid?: Descriptions in 'The Lord of the Rings'". Tolkien Studies. 10 (1). Project MUSE: 49–67. doi:10.1353/tks.2013.0011. ISSN 1547-3163. S2CID 170171727.
- Berube, Pierre H. (2018). "Bilingual Puns in 'The Lord of the Rings'". Mythlore. 37 (1). Article 15.
- Blakeslee-Drain, Benjamin (2025). "Unknowing in Tolkien's Legendarium and the Agnosia of the Elvish Tradition" (PDF). Mythlore. 44 (1 (147)): 31–68.
- Carpenter, Humphrey (1977). J. R. R. Tolkien: A Biography. New York: Ballantine Books. ISBN 978-0-04-928037-3.
- Carpenter, Humphrey, ed. (2023) [1981]. The Letters of J. R. R. Tolkien: Revised and Expanded Edition. New York: HarperCollins. ISBN 978-0-35-865298-4.
- Clark Hall, J. R. (2002) [1894]. A Concise Anglo-Saxon Dictionary (4th ed.). University of Toronto Press.
- Cohen, Cynthia M. (2009). "The Unique Representation of Trees in 'The Lord of the Rings'". Tolkien Studies. 6 (1). Project Muse: 91–125. doi:10.1353/tks.0.0041. hdl:10211.3/157628. ISSN 1547-3163. S2CID 170258551.
- Drout, Michael D. C. (2011). "The Rohirrim, the Anglo-Saxons, and the Problem of Appendix F: Ambiguity, Analogy and Reference in Tolkien's Books and Jackson's Films". In Bogstad, Janice M.; Kaveny, Philip E. (eds.). Picturing Tolkien: Essays on Peter Jackson's 'The Lord of the Rings' Film Trilogy. McFarland. pp. 248–263. ISBN 978-0-7864-8473-7.
- Flieger, Verlyn (2014). "But What Did He Really Mean?". Tolkien Studies. 11 (1). Project Muse: 149–166. doi:10.1353/tks.2014.0005. ISSN 1547-3163. S2CID 170678439.
- Flieger, Verlyn (2019). "The Arch and the Keystone". Mythlore. 38 (1). Article 3.
- Jorgensen, Estelle R. (2010). "Music, myth, and education: The case of The Lord of the Rings film trilogy" (PDF). Journal of Aesthetic Education. 44 (1): 44–57. doi:10.5406/jaesteduc.44.1.0044. hdl:2022/27585. JSTOR 10.5406/jaesteduc.44.1.0044.
- Madsen, Catherine (1988). "Light from an Invisible Lamp: Natural Religion in The Lord of the Rings". Mythlore. 14 (3). Article 9.
- Newman, J. K. (2005). "J.R.R. Tolkien's 'The Lord of the Rings': A Classical Perspective". Illinois Classical Studies. 30: 229–247. JSTOR 23065305.
- Podhorodecka, Joanna (2013). "Reviving Dead Metaphors: Images of Evil in JRR Tolkien's 'The Lord of the Rings'". In Branny, Grażyna; Holland, J. Gill (eds.). Fictions and Metafictions of Evil. Essays in Literary Criticism, Comparative Literature and Interdisciplinary Studies. Frankfurt am Main: Peter Lang. pp. 215–237. ISBN 978-3-653-03503-2.
- Raffel, Burton (1968). "The Lord of the Rings as Literature". In Isaacs, Neil D.; Zimbardo, Rose A. (eds.). Tolkien and the Critics: Essays on J.R.R. Tolkien's The Lord of the Rings. Notre Dame, Indiana: University of Notre Dame Press. pp. 218–248. ISBN 978-0-268-00279-4.
- Shippey, Tom (2005) [1982]. The Road to Middle-Earth: How J. R. R. Tolkien Created a New Mythology (Third ed.). HarperCollins. ISBN 978-0-261-10275-0.
- Thompson-Handell, Matthew (2025). "No Ragnarök, No Armageddon: Pagan and Christian interpretations of The Lord of the Rings". Mythlore. 43 (2). Article 2.
- Thurman, Judith (1999). Secrets of the Flesh: a Life of Colette. New York: Knopf. ISBN 978-0-394-58872-8.
- Tolkien, J. R. R. (1954a). The Fellowship of the Ring. The Lord of the Rings. Boston: Houghton Mifflin. OCLC 9552942.
- Tolkien, J. R. R. (1954). The Two Towers. The Lord of the Rings. Boston: Houghton Mifflin. OCLC 1042159111.
- Tolkien, J. R. R. (1955). The Return of the King. The Lord of the Rings. Boston: Houghton Mifflin. OCLC 519647821.
- Walker, Steve (2009). The Power of Tolkien's Prose: Middle-Earth's Magical Style. New York: Palgrave Macmillan. ISBN 978-0-230-61992-0.
