= Goldberry =

Fictional character from Middle-Earth

- Middle-earth character

In-universe information
- Alias: River-woman's daughter
- Spouse: Tom Bombadil
- Book(s): The Fellowship of the Ring (1954); The Adventures of Tom Bombadil (1962); Tales from the Perilous Realm (1997)

Goldberry is a character from the works of the author J. R. R. Tolkien. She first appeared in print in a 1934 poem, The Adventures of Tom Bombadil, where she appears as the wife of Tom Bombadil. Also known as the "River-woman's daughter", she is described as a beautiful, youthful woman with golden hair. She is best known from her appearance as a supporting character in Tolkien's high fantasy epic The Lord of the Rings, first published in 1954 and 1955.

Like her husband, Goldberry's role and origins are enigmatic and have been debated by scholars. On her possible origins, scholars have compared her with a character in George MacDonald's 1867 fairy tale The Golden Key, and with the eponymous character in the late-medieval lyric poem The Maid of the Moor. Her characterisation has been described as a mixture of the domestic and the supernatural, connected in some way with the river Withywindle in the Old Forest of Middle-earth. Some have suggested that she may be a divine being in Tolkien's mythology; others, that she recalls the biblical Eve, a token of the unfallen creation; and an embodiment of joy, serving with Tom Bombadil as a model of the Catholic sacrament of marriage.

Both Bombadil and Goldberry were omitted from Peter Jackson's film trilogy; they were, however, included in the 1991 Russian television play Khraniteli and the second season of The Lord of the Rings: The Rings of Power.

== Origins ==
J. R. R. Tolkien never explored the specific details regarding Goldberry's origins. Tom Bombadil says that he discovered her in the river Withywindle within the Old Forest, and her title "River-woman's daughter" strongly suggests that she is not a mortal human being. In a 1958 letter, Tolkien wrote that Goldberry "represents the actual seasonal changes" in "real river-lands in autumn". (Note: Carpenter 2023, letter 210 to Forrest J. Ackerman, June 1958) He conveyed this notion through a poem recited by Frodo Baggins in The Fellowship of the Ring, specifically the lines "O spring-time and summer-time, and spring again after!" (Note: Tolkien 1954a, book 1, ch. 7 "In the House of Tom Bombadil")

For the scholar of literature Isabelle Pantin, the sequence involving Goldberry in The Lord of the Rings is reminiscent of a passage from The Golden Key by George MacDonald: the heroine, Tangle, after having almost been suffocated by a tree believing herself being pursued by the bears of Goldilocks, is taken in by a kindly old lady dressed in a mermaid's finery and holding a basin full of fish. Pantin noted that Goldberry herself is reminiscent of the Goldilocks character: she has a similar hairstyle and her house appears to be as comfortable as that of the bears.

The Tolkien scholar John M. Bowers writes that Goldberry recalls The Maid of the Moor, a late-medieval lyric familiar to Tolkien which contains the lines

What was hire mete?
The primerole and the violet.

What was hire dring?
The chelde water of the welle-spring.

== Appearances ==
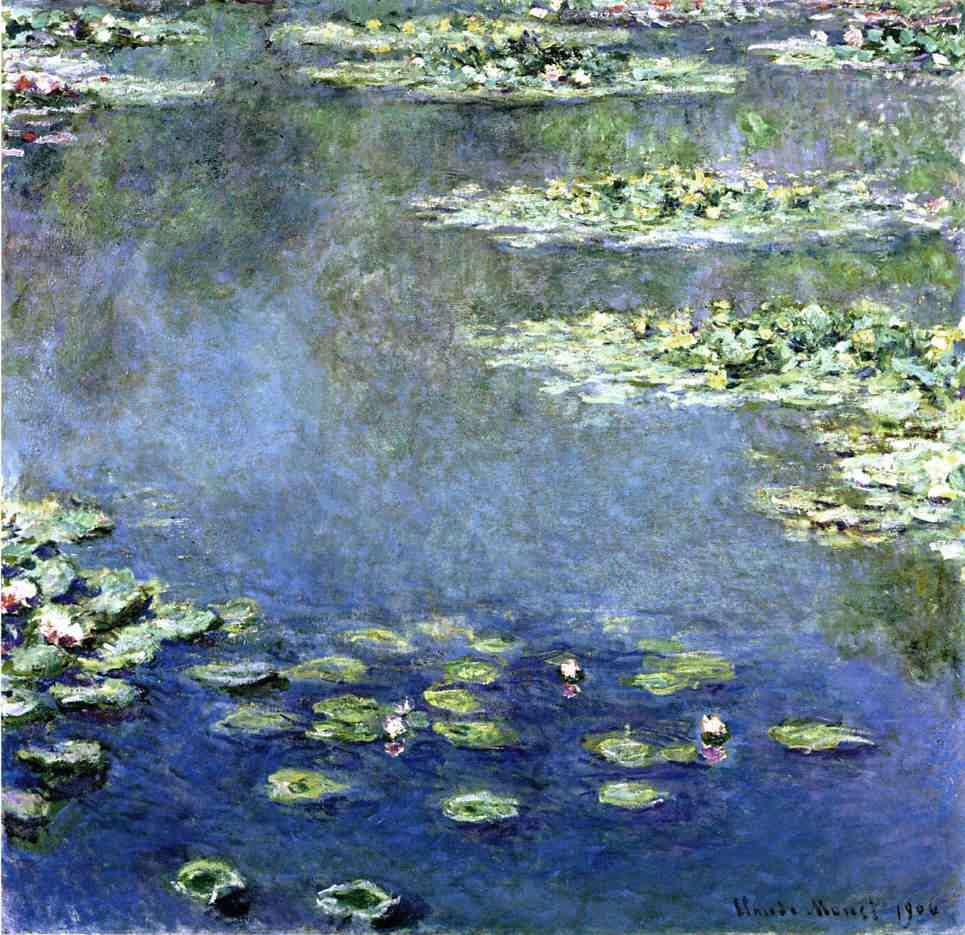
Goldberry is associated with water lilies, and her house is surrounded by a water lily pond. Painting by Claude Monet, 1897

Goldberry first appeared in Tolkien's 1934 poem, The Adventures of Tom Bombadil, re-worked into a 1962 poetry collection of the same name. The poem tells of how she drags Tom into the river before he escapes, returning later to capture her and make her his bride.

In The Fellowship of the Ring, the first volume of The Lord of the Rings, Frodo and his companions Sam, Merry, and Pippin encounter Goldberry and Tom in the Old Forest near Buckland. After the Hobbits are rescued from Old Man Willow, the couple offers them refuge in their cottage, which is surrounded by a pond of water lilies. The hobbits' stay is brief but strange, for Bombadil and Goldberry are clearly more than they seem. Like her earlier incarnation, Goldberry retains a link with nature, and more particularly running water. She is described as having a mermaid adornment on her hair, her gown "rustled softly like the wind on the flowered banks of a river" as she ran, and the songs she sings to the hobbits remind them of "ponds and waters larger than they had ever known." (Note: Tolkien 1954a, book 1, ch. 6 "The Old Forest") (Note: Tolkien 1954a, book 1, ch. 7 "In the House of Tom Bombadil")

Goldberry's final reference in Tolkien's works prior to his death is in the poem Once Upon a Time, published in 1965. Described as wearing "a wild-rose crown", she blows away a dandelion clock from within a lady-smock. (Note: The full text of Once upon a Time is available on Tolkien Gateway.)

== Analysis ==
=== Type of being ===
Her long yellow hair rippled down her shoulders; her gown was green, green as young reeds, shot with silver like beads of dew; and her belt was of gold, shaped like a chain of flag-lilies set with the pale-blue eyes of forget-me-nots. About her feet in wide vessels of green and brown earthenware, white water-lilies were floating, so that she seemed to be enthroned in the midst of a pool.
— The Fellowship of the Ring, book 1, ch. 7, "In the House of Tom Bombadil"

Goldberry does not fit easily into any of Tolkien's definitions of sentient beings in his world, and like Tom Bombadil she remains an enigma. With regards to Goldberry's true nature within the context of Middle-earth, the Tolkien scholar Tom Shippey suggested that Goldberry is similar to the many named water spirits of traditional English folklore such as Jenny Greenteeth or Peg Powler of the River Tees, though she is a noticeably gentler figure than they are. The scholar Ann McCauley believed that she is likely a water sprite, while John D. Rateliff suggested that, at least within the context of Tolkien's early mythology, she should be seen as one of the wide category of fays, spirits, and elementals. Goldberry's association with water, writes Leo Carruthers, thematically links Bombadil with Väinämöinen and his fiancée Aino from the Kalevala, the Finnish national epic.

The scholar Ruth Noel calls Bombadil and Goldberry "undisguised personifications of land untouched by humans".

Another proposed explanation is that she is one of the Ainur, specifically the Vala Yavanna. There are physical similarities between Goldberry and Yavanna: both characters have blond hair and dress in green, and are associated with the plant kingdom, which would make Tom Bombadil an avatar of Aulë, husband of Yavanna. Taryne Jade Taylor associates Goldberry with the Greek myth of the goddess Persephone, for the way she is captured by Bombadil and its association with the rhythm of the seasons, as well as Étaín, a deity in Irish mythology associated with light. For Christina Ljungberg, Goldberry is one of the three divinities of personified Nature that exist on the side of good: she represents the immanent goddess, while Elbereth or Varda represents the transcendent goddess, and the elf queen Galadriel combines these two aspects.

=== Gender role ===
Goldberry, with the smooth and kind way she relates to her odd husband Tom Bombadil and through her elegance, accomplishment, and connection to the natural world, brings much needed peace to Tolkien's The Lord of the Rings. She seeks nothing, longs for nothing, yet appreciates and nurtures everything and everyone around her.
— Katherine Hasser, J.R.R. Tolkien Encyclopedia: Scholarship and Critical Assessment

In the J.R.R. Tolkien Encyclopedia, Katherine Hasser observed that Goldberry appeared to the hobbits in the diverse roles of "goddess, nurturer, and manager of domestic responsibilities". With regards to her initial appearance, Hasser said Tolkien's description evokes a "Botticelli-like image of a woman embodied and surrounded by the natural characteristics of her environment", and her clothing reflects her peaceful, symbiotic connection with the natural world.

Goldberry is sometimes discussed in critical commentary about the roles of women in The Lord of the Rings. She is presented as a hospitable domestic figure, a good hostess who feeds passing travellers. While the scholar of children's literature Melissa McCrory Hatcher called her "a mystical washer-woman", Hasser emphasized that the most significant point about Goldberry as a feminine figure is that she shares a cooperative and reciprocal domestic relationship with Bombadil, with a dynamic of equality that is not seen in other romantic pairings in Tolkien's body of work as the other Middle-earth peoples often have a clearer separation of gender roles within their societies. Hasser noted that Goldberry is the sole female character in The Lord of the Rings who does not have a personal agenda, and that she provides a feminine figure who is "pure, content, significant to the world around her, and wise" in its narrative.

=== Theological role ===
For several critics, the appearance of Goldberry in The Lord of the Rings foreshadows that of Galadriel's later appearance: both are beautiful and of regal stature, live in an isolated domain and are associated with water. Ann McCauley Basso compared Goldberry as a biblical Eve figure to Galadriel's Mary. In an entry on redemption in mythopoeic writing by the Catholic writer Joseph Pearce for the J.R.R. Tolkien Encyclopedia, the apparent innocence and primitive nature of Goldberry and Tom Bombadil is analogous to Adam and Eve, as they represent the "Unfallen Creation".

=== Sacrament of marriage ===
The scholar Brandon Best sees Goldberry's relationship to Tom Bombadil as a model of the sacrament of marriage, something to be witnessed rather than explained. Further, they sing of all creation, celebrating the natural order, and they include themselves as part of that order, with Goldberry's song:

Wind on the open hill, bells on the heather,
Reeds by the shady pool, lilies on the water:
Old Tom Bombadil and the River-daughter!

Robert Chapman-Morales notes that scholars such as L. Eugene Startzman and Jennifer Raimundo see Goldberry and Bombadil as embodiments of unexpected joy, an aspect of Tolkien's eucatastrophe. He quotes one of Tolkien's letters: "the government of a 'family' ... was not a monarchy ... It was a 'dyarchy', in which master and mistress had equal status, if different functions." (Note: Carpenter 2023, letter 214 to A. C. Nunn, draft 1958-1959) He notes also that Basso describes the couple's marital joy, and he remarks on their "mutual respect when we see how different they are, yet how perfectly they work together".

== Adaptations ==
=== Radio ===
In a twelve-part radio adaptation of The Lord of the Rings which ran from 1955 to 1956, the producer Terence Tiller wrote Goldberry as Tom Bombadil's daughter. This alteration annoyed Tolkien, (Note: Carpenter 2023, letter 175 To Mrs Molly Waldron, November 1955) though he conceded that the events described in the 1934 poem are not clearly summarized in the published version of The Lord of the Rings.

The chapters involving the Old Forest and its characters were omitted from Brian Sibley and Michael Bakewell's 1981 radio adaptation of The Lord of the Rings. In 1992, Sibley produced a radio series, Tales from the Perilous Realm, which featured short texts by Tolkien; the episode "The Adventures of Tom Bombadil" covered The Lord of the Rings chapters cut from the 1981 adaptation, including those about the Old Forest. Goldberry is voiced by Sorcha Cusack for the adaptation.

=== Film ===
A scene of the chapter "The House of Tom Bombadil" from the 1991 Russian television play Khraniteli, showing Goldberry and Tom Bombadil with the four hobbits made to appear small using a green screen technique

In 1957 Tolkien was consulted about a cartoon of The Lord of the Rings, its first proposed cinematic treatment. On the subject of Goldberry, he said he would much rather that she be omitted from the adaptation than make a cameo appearance without context or meaning. The film director Peter Jackson omitted Goldberry and Bombadil from his films; he stated that this was because they did little to advance the story and would have made the films unnecessarily long.

Only one adaptation includes Goldberry, the 1991 Russian Khraniteli, where she is portrayed by Regina Lialeikite (as "Zolotinka" (Note: The name Zolotinka means "gold flake" and is the name of a gold-mining region in Siberia.)). The version uses a green screen technique to present her as much larger than the hobbits dining at her table.

Goldberry is voiced by Raya Yarbrough in the second season of The Lord of the Rings: The Rings of Power.

=== Games and other media ===
Along with Bombadil, Goldberry appears as a non-player character in the 2002 video game The Lord of the Rings: The Fellowship of the Ring, where she is voiced by Kath Soucie.

Goldberry appears in the massively multiplayer online role-playing game The Lord of the Rings Online. She is found in "Goldberry's Glade" in the Old Forest, where a quest to gather lilies on her behalf at the foot of Old Man Willow is given to the player by Bombadil. Her race is referred to as "River-maid", as the game also features Goldberry's sister Naruhel, an original character who is of a darker and crueller nature.

The 1969 Harvard Lampoon novel Bored of the Rings depicts a parody character named "Hashberry", partner to the equally drug-soaked Tim Benzedrine. Her name was a reference to Haight-Ashbury, a district of San Francisco nicknamed Hashbury and widely seen as the origin of hippie counterculture.

The 2023 Magic: The Gathering set The Lord of the Rings: Tales of Middle-earth includes the card “Goldberry, River-Daughter” and represents her as a Nymph whose color alignment is blue.

== See also ==
- Korrigan – a beautiful female spirit in Celtic legend
- Naiad – a female water-spirit in Classical mythology
- Neck (water spirit) – a dangerous female water-spirit in Germanic legend
