= Khraniteli =

Live-action Soviet teleplay adaptation of The Fellowship of the Ring

- Title screen of the first part
- Хранители
- Based on: The Fellowship of the Ring
- Written by: Natalya Serebryakova
- Story by: J. R. R. Tolkien
- Directed by: Natalya Serebryakova, Costel Tudor Voica
- Narrated by: Andrei Romanov
- Music by: Andrei Romanov
- Country of origin: Soviet Union
- Original language: Russian

Production
- Producer: Larisa Lebedeva
- Cinematography: Anatoliy Korinetskiy
- Running time: 115 minutes (2 episodes)
- Production company: Leningrad Television

Original release
- Release: 1991

Khraniteli (Russian: Хранители, lit. 'Guardians [of the Ring]') is a Soviet television play miniseries based on J. R. R. Tolkien's The Fellowship of the Ring. It was broadcast once in 1991 by Leningrad Television and then thought lost before being rediscovered in 2021. It includes scenes of Tom Bombadil and Goldberry that were omitted from the 1978 film and Peter Jackson's Lord of the Rings film trilogy.

== Background ==
J. R. R. Tolkien's fantasy novel The Lord of the Rings was published in three volumes in 1954 and 1955. He was doubtful whether the work could be dramatized or filmed, but he and his publishers, Allen and Unwin, were happy to discuss film proposals, on condition of having a veto on creative decisions or of relinquishing those for a suitably large sum of money. Early attempts were mainly animations; the first was Ralph Bakshi's 1978 version of The Fellowship of the Ring with parts of The Two Towers. The film rights then went through various hands, and filming, whether with animation or live-action, was considered by many directors.

== Production ==
A teleplay adaptation of The Fellowship of the Ring, Khraniteli ("Keepers" or "Guardians" of the Ring) was made on a low budget on videotape by Leningrad Television and aired once in the last days of the Soviet Union in 1991. The film was thought lost, but was in 2021 rediscovered and republished on YouTube by Leningrad Television's successor, Channel 5. The film has attracted interest for its inclusion of characters such as Tom Bombadil, Goldberry, and the Barrow-wight, featuring in a detour made by the story's Hobbit protagonists through the Old Forest, and omitted from Peter Jackson's later version of The Lord of the Rings as not furthering the plot. The teleplay had a score by Andrei "Dyusha" Romanov of the Russian rock band Akvarium.

The adaptation used the 1982 Russian translation of Tolkien's book by Vladimir Muravyov and Andrey Kistyakovsky. Sergey Shelgunov, who played Merry Brandybuck, recalled that the entire shoot spanned some nine hours, and took place in under a week.

== Plot ==
A scene of the chapter "The House of Tom Bombadil", showing Goldberry and Tom Bombadil, with the four hobbits drastically scaled down in a green-screen effect

=== Part 1 ===
At Bilbo Baggins's birthday party, during a firework show, Bilbo puts on the Ring and vanishes, causing consternation. Frodo Baggins inherits the ring after Bilbo has left. The black-clad Ringwraiths appear, on black horses, in a flashback, followed by the story of Smeagol and how he murders his friend Deagol and turns into the monster, Gollum. The wizard Gandalf meets Gollum and interrogates him. Frodo and his three hobbit companions set out, crossing the Shire to Crickhollow in Buckland. They enter the Old Forest, where the evil tree Old Man Willow traps a hobbit. He is rescued by Tom Bombadil, who takes the hobbits to his home, where his wife Goldberry entertains them at her table. They set out again, only to be trapped once more, this time by the undead Barrow-wight.

=== Part 2 ===
The Barrow-wight lays out the unconscious Hobbits in his barrow as for a funeral. Frodo wakes up and summons Tom Bombadil, who frees the Hobbits. They ride through a forested landscape in the snow to Bree and enter the Prancing Pony Inn. They eat and drink; Frodo and a woman dance and sing. Frodo puts on the Ring and vanishes, causing shock. Frodo meets Aragorn; the Hobbits go with him to a bedroom, where he explains who he is. They agree to travel with him. They travel to Weathertop, where they fight the Ringwraiths. Frodo is wounded and falls unconscious. They ride to Rivendell, where Frodo wakes up. The Elf-lord Elrond convenes his council; Boromir demands that they use the Ring against the enemy, but they agree instead to form a Fellowship to take it to Mordor and destroy it where it was made, in the fires of Mount Doom. In a flashback, Gandalf meets the white wizard Saruman and sees that he has gone over to evil, with his own army of orcs; Saruman imprisons Gandalf in his tower, Orthanc, but Gandalf is rescued by an eagle. Back in Rivendell, the dwarf Gimli and the elf Legolas join the party. The Fellowship travel to the underground realm of Moria where they fight monsters and orcs. They cross the narrow bridge across a chasm and realize that Gandalf has been killed by the Balrog. They arrive in Lothlórien where the Elves dance in a golden forest; the Hobbits sleep. They meet the Elf-lady Galadriel; Frodo offers her the Ring, which she refuses; the eye of the Dark Lord Sauron is seen searching for the Ring. Boromir attempts to get the Ring from Frodo; Frodo and Sam set out for Mordor on their own.

== Reception ==
Khraniteli's production values have been described as from another era, with basic sets and "ludicrous" green-screen effects. Western commentators greeted its re-emergence with comments about its "gloriously rudimentary" production. NME quoted a Russian user as writing "It is as absurd and monstrous as it is divine and magnificent. The opening song is especially lovely. Thanks to the one who found this rarity." Newsweek quoted another user as writing that "While listening to the opening mournful song, I almost died from laughter and pleasure". The Metro commented that the teleplay's simple effects give it a feeling more like "a theatre production than a movie, which adds to the charm". The New York Post cited a "wistful" American viewer who was wishing for a Russian "hero" to create English subtitles. The Russian REN TV noted that the Elf Legolas was played by a woman, Olga Serebryakova, daughter of the film's director. The Chicago Tribune commented that the narrator (Andrei "Dyusha" Romanov) is "a bearded man wearing oversized eyeglasses that scream 1991", while the magical soft-focus effect seemed to be a smear of hair gel on the camera lens. Entertainment Weekly described the Bombadil scene as evoking "a sense of fairy-tale surrealism".

The BBC noted that within a few days of its reappearance, the first episode had been watched over half a million times, and described the film as a "weirdly psychedelic Soviet reimagining", very unlike Jackson's later epic. It commented that the costumes looked as if they had been borrowed from theatre productions of William Shakespeare or Lope de Vega, so that the wizard Gandalf resembled a knight errant, and the Elf-lord Elrond was dressed like Othello.

== Cast ==
The cast included:

- Aragorn/Strider: Andrey Tenetko
- Barliman Butterbur ("Lavr Narkiss"): Nikolay Burov
- Bilbo Baggins: Georgy Shtil
- Boromir: Evgeny Solyakov
- Elrond: Andrei Tolshin
- Frodo Baggins: Valery Dyachenko
- Galadriel: Elena Solovey
- Goldberry ("Zolotinka" (Note: The name Zolotinka means "gold flake" and is the name of a gold-mining region in Siberia.)): Regina Leleikytė
- Gollum: Viktor Smirnov
- Gandalf: Victor Kostetskiy
- Legolas: Olga Serebryakova
- Lobelia Sackville-Baggins ("Lyubeliya Lyakoshel"): Lillian Malkina
- Merry Brandybuck: Sergey Shelgunov
- Pippin Took: Vadim Nikitin
- Sam Gamgee ("Sam Scrombie"): Vladimir Matveev
- Saruman: Evgeny Baranov
- Tom Bombadil: Sergei Parshin
- Narrator: Dyusha Romanov

== Crew ==
The crew included:

- Natalya Serebryakova, Costel Tudor Voica: Director, script
- Larisa Lebedeva: Production
- Andrei "Dyusha" Romanov: Music
- Anatoliy Korinetskiy: Cinematography
- Ida Kaydanova: Properties
- Viktoriya Yermakova: Production design
- Yuliya Goltsova: Costumes
- Vanentina Efimova: Sound direction

== See also ==
- The Last Ringbearer
