= Old Man Willow =

Evil character in Tolkien's fiction

Old Man Willow, drawn by Tolkien while he was writing the chapter on the Old Forest. A face can just be made out on the right-hand side of the tree above the arm-like branch.

Old Man Willow is a fictional character in J. R. R. Tolkien's fantasy epic novel The Lord of the Rings, appearing in the first volume, The Fellowship of the Ring. He is a malign tree-spirit of great age in Tom Bombadil's Old Forest, appearing physically as a large willow tree beside the River Withywindle, but spreading his influence throughout the forest. He is the first hostile character encountered by the Hobbits after they leave the Shire.

Tolkien made a drawing of Old Man Willow while writing the chapter about him; his son Christopher suggests it was based on a tree by the River Cherwell at Oxford. A predatory tree appears in a 1934 poem, but Tolkien did not arrive at the malevolent Old Man Willow, both tree and spirit, for some years. Scholars have debated the nature of the tree; some have been surprised by it, as Tolkien is seen as an environmentalist. The character was omitted by both Ralph Bakshi and Peter Jackson from their film versions of The Lord of the Rings.

== Context ==
Protagonist Frodo Baggins and his Hobbit companions Sam Gamgee and Pippin Took set out from his home at Hobbiton in the Shire. They are pursued by mysterious Black Riders. (Note: Tolkien 1954a book 1, ch. 3, "Three is Company") They travel eastwards and cross the Bucklebury Ferry over the Brandywine River, meeting their friend Merry Brandybuck. (Note: Tolkien 1954a book 1, ch. 4, "A Short Cut to Mushrooms") They rest briefly in Buckland, (Note: Tolkien 1954a book 1, ch. 5, "A Conspiracy Unmasked") deciding to shake off the Black Riders by cutting through the Old Forest. (Note: Tolkien 1954a book 1, ch. 6, "The Old Forest")

Old Man Willow first appeared in Tolkien's poem "The Adventures of Tom Bombadil", published in 1934 in The Oxford Magazine.

== Character ==
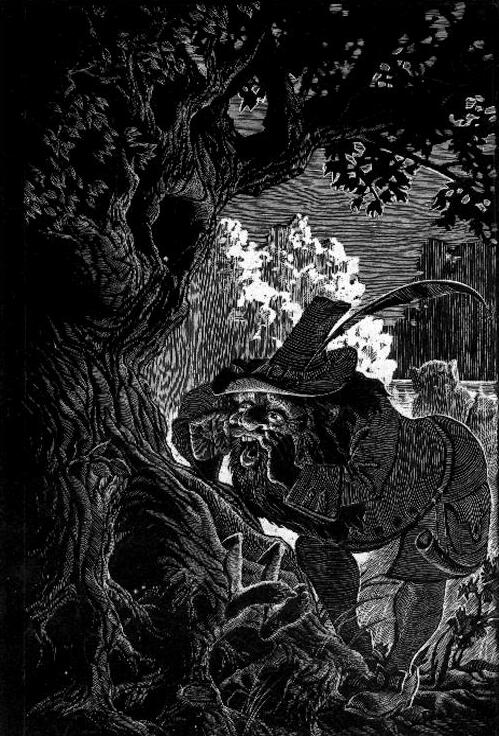
Tom Bombadil frees the Hobbits from Old Man Willow. Scraperboard illustration by Alexander Korotich, 1981

Old Man Willow is a malign tree-spirit of great age in Tom Bombadil's Old Forest, appearing physically as a large willow tree beside the River Withywindle, but spreading his influence throughout the forest. As Tolkien explains in the narrative of The Lord of the Rings:

But none was more dangerous than the Great Willow: his heart was rotten, but his strength was green; and he was cunning, and a master of winds, and his song and thought ran through the woods on both sides of the river. His grey thirsty spirit drew power out of the earth and spread like fine root-threads in the ground, and invisible twig fingers in the air, till it had under its dominion nearly all the trees of the Forest from the Hedge to the Downs. (Note: Tolkien 1954a book 1, ch. 7 "In the House of Tom Bombadil")

== Narrative ==
In the story, Old Man Willow casts a spell on the hobbits, causing them to feel sleepy. Merry and Pippin lean against the trunk of the willow and fall asleep, while Frodo sits on a root to dangle his feet in the water, before he also falls asleep. The willow then traps Merry and Pippin in the cracks of its trunk and tips Frodo into the stream, but the latter is saved by Sam, who, suspicious of the tree, manages to remain awake. After Frodo and Sam start a fire out of dry leaves, grass, and bits of bark in an attempt to frighten the tree, Merry shouts from the inside to put the fire out because the tree says it is going to squeeze them to death. They are saved by the arrival of Tom Bombadil who sings to the ancient tree to release Merry and Pippin. The tree then ejects the two hobbits. Once they are safely in his house, Bombadil explains to the hobbits that the "Great Willow" is wholly evil, and has gradually spread his domination across the Old Forest until almost all the trees from the Hedge to the Barrow-downs are under his control.

== Drawing ==
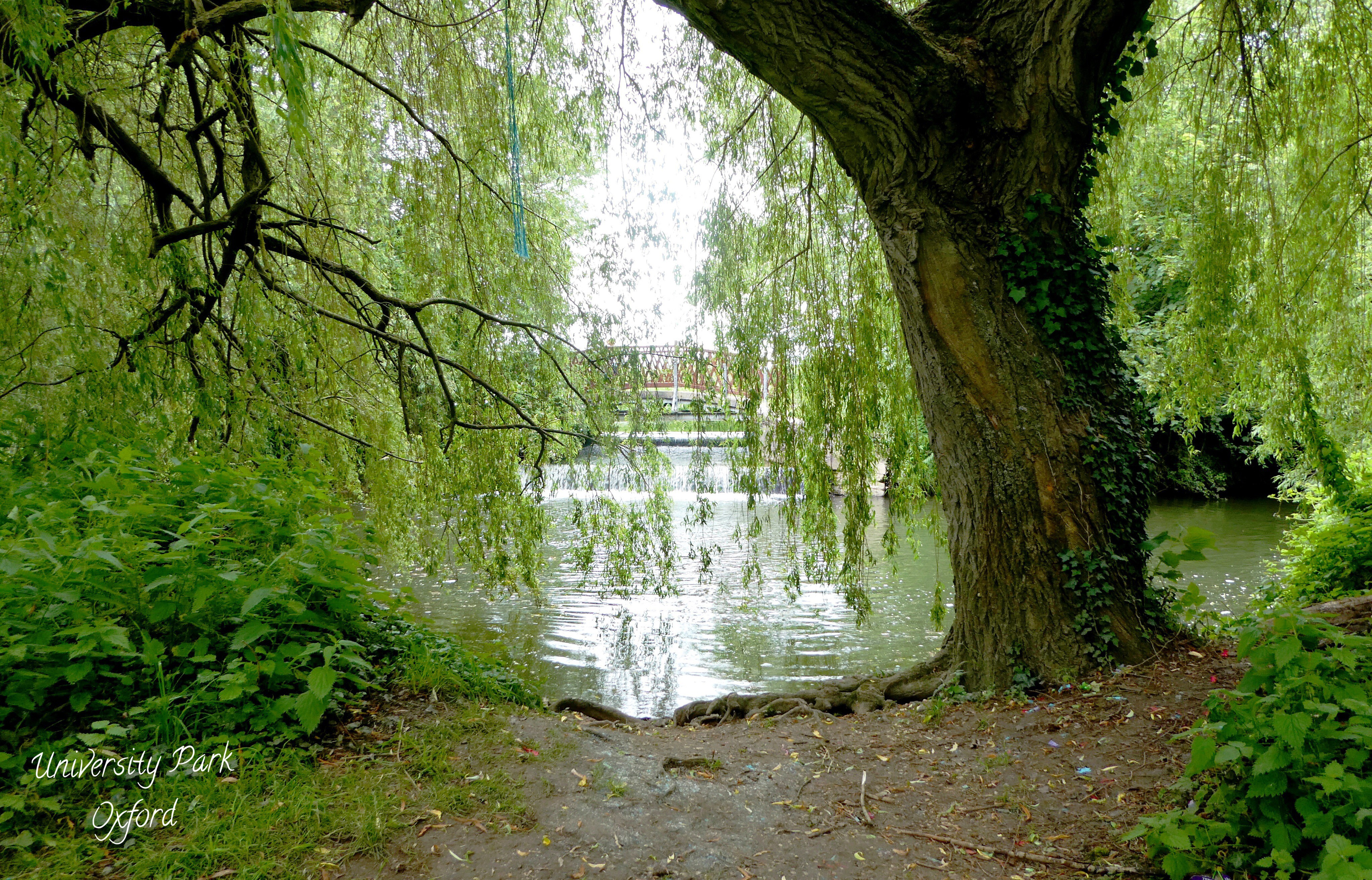
Tolkien may have based his drawing of Old Man Willow on a tree beside the River Cherwell in Oxford, like this one in the University Parks there.

Tolkien made a careful pencil and coloured pencil drawing of Old Man Willow while he was writing the chapter "The Old Forest"; Wayne Hammond and Christina Scull call it "a fine example" of the drawings he made to support his creative writing. They note that "with a little imagination" a face can just be made out on the right-hand side of the tree above the arm-like branch. Tolkien describes it as a "huge willow-tree, old and hoary"; to the hobbits it seemed enormous, though Hammond and Scull observe that it does not seem so in the drawing. Tolkien's son John suggests that it was based on one of the few unpollarded willows on the River Cherwell at Oxford.

== Analysis ==
=== Etymological connotations ===
Tolkien was a philologist. Jason Fisher, writing that "all stories begin with words", takes up Edmund Wilson's "denigrating dismissal" of The Lord of the Rings as "a philological curiosity", replying that to him this is "precisely one of its greatest strengths". Fisher explores in detail the connotations of Tolkien's use of words meaning bent and twisted, including Ringwraith as well as willow or withy (a willow, or flexible twigs from it twisted and woven into wicker baskets), this last from Old English wiþig. "Windle", too, is an old word for a wicker basket, from Old English windel-treow, the willow, the basket-maker's tree, as well as a cognate of the modern English "to wind". Thus, Old Man Willow's Withywindle is perhaps the "willow-winding" river. Fisher comments, too, that Old Man Willow could be said to have gone to the bad, like the Ringwraiths or in the words of the Middle English poem Pearl that Tolkien translated, wyrþe so wrange away, "writhed so wrong away" or "strayed so far from right".

=== Interpretations ===
The Tolkien scholar Verlyn Flieger writes that Old Man Willow first appears as "a predatory tree" in the 1934 poem "The Adventures of Tom Bombadil", and that the character is developed in The Lord of the Rings, as documented in The Return of the Shadow. In an early draft from 1938, she writes, the "Willow" tree and the "Old Man" character had not yet become a single "indivisible being". Instead, Tolkien writes of "how that grey thirsty earth-bound spirit had become imprisoned in the greatest Willow of the Forest." Flieger writes that in this draft and in the 1943 "Manuscript B", Tolkien links "a tree and a spirit, a 'non-incarnate mind'" which is "imprisoned" in an individual tree. She comments that Tolkien solved the problem of how a spirit might become trapped in this way by turning them into a single being, at once a tree and a spirit.

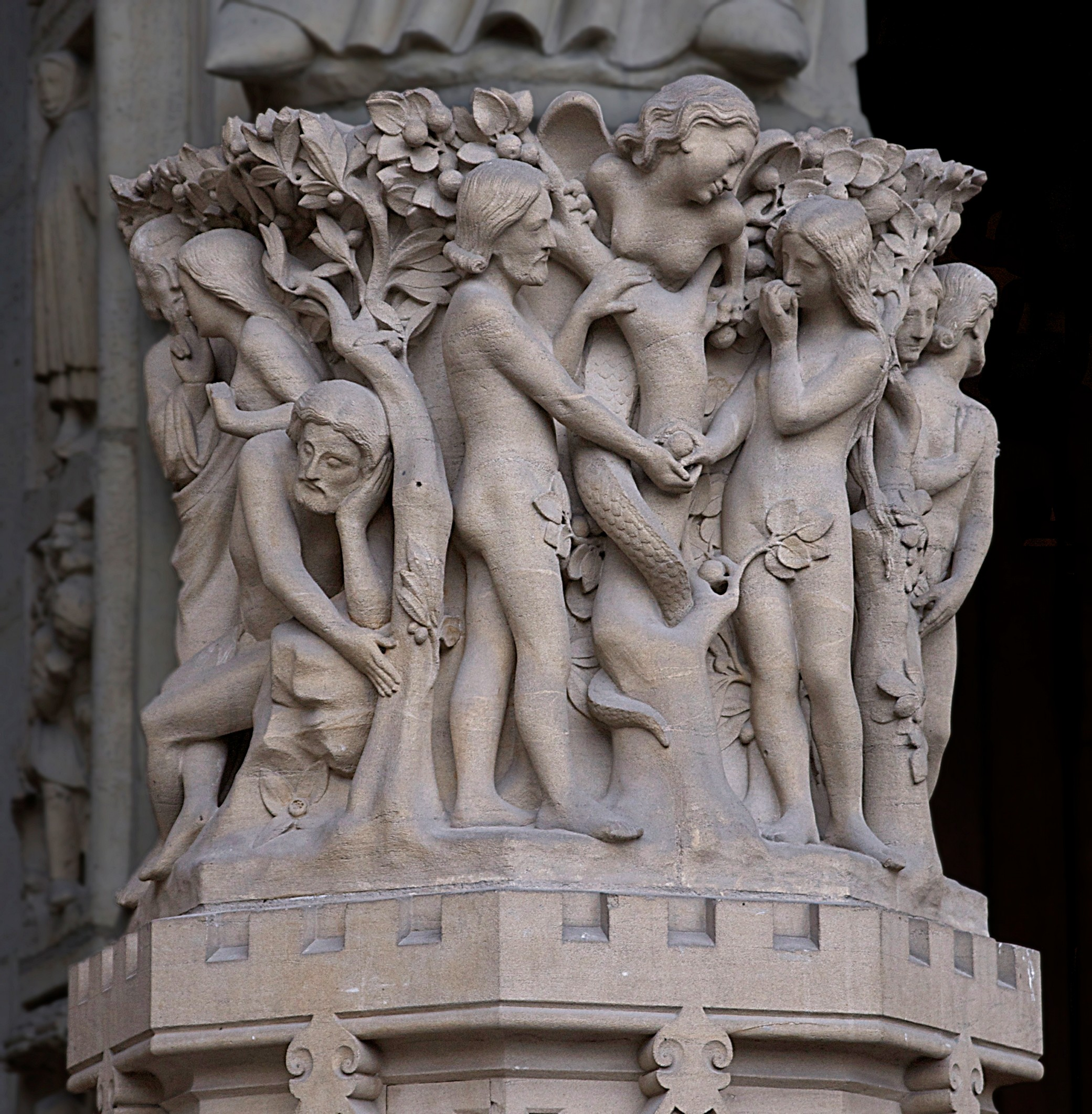
Tolkien, a Roman Catholic, believed that living things such as trees had been affected by the Fall of Man. Medieval statuary of the Fall at Notre Dame de Paris

Saguaro and Thacker comment that critics have puzzled over Tolkien's description of Old Man Willow, as it does not fit with Tolkien's image as an environmentalist "tree-hugger". They write that trees (like other creatures in Tolkien's world) are subject to the corruption of the Fall of Man, mentioning Tolkien's Catholicism. They state that while Tolkien's writings on the meaning of trees verges on the pagan, both the Old and the New Testament use trees as symbols – the Tree of Knowledge of Good and Evil in the Book of Genesis, the cross, the tree of death in the Gospels, and the Tree of Life in Revelation (22:2). In their view, Tolkien succeeds in "bring[ing] all these elements together" in The Lord of the Rings: death, creation, sub-creation, re-creation. Dickerson writes that Old Man Willow indicates both that nature, like Man, is fallen, and that it is actively hostile to Man. The Tolkien critic Jared Lobdell compares the "treachery of natural things in an animate world" seen in the character of Old Man Willow to Algernon Blackwood's story "The Willows".

Paul H. Kocher writes that it is unclear whether the tree's malice derives from the Dark Lord Sauron, or is simply the tree's own "natural hatred for destructive mankind", and notes that the hostility extends to all travellers, "innocent and guilty alike".

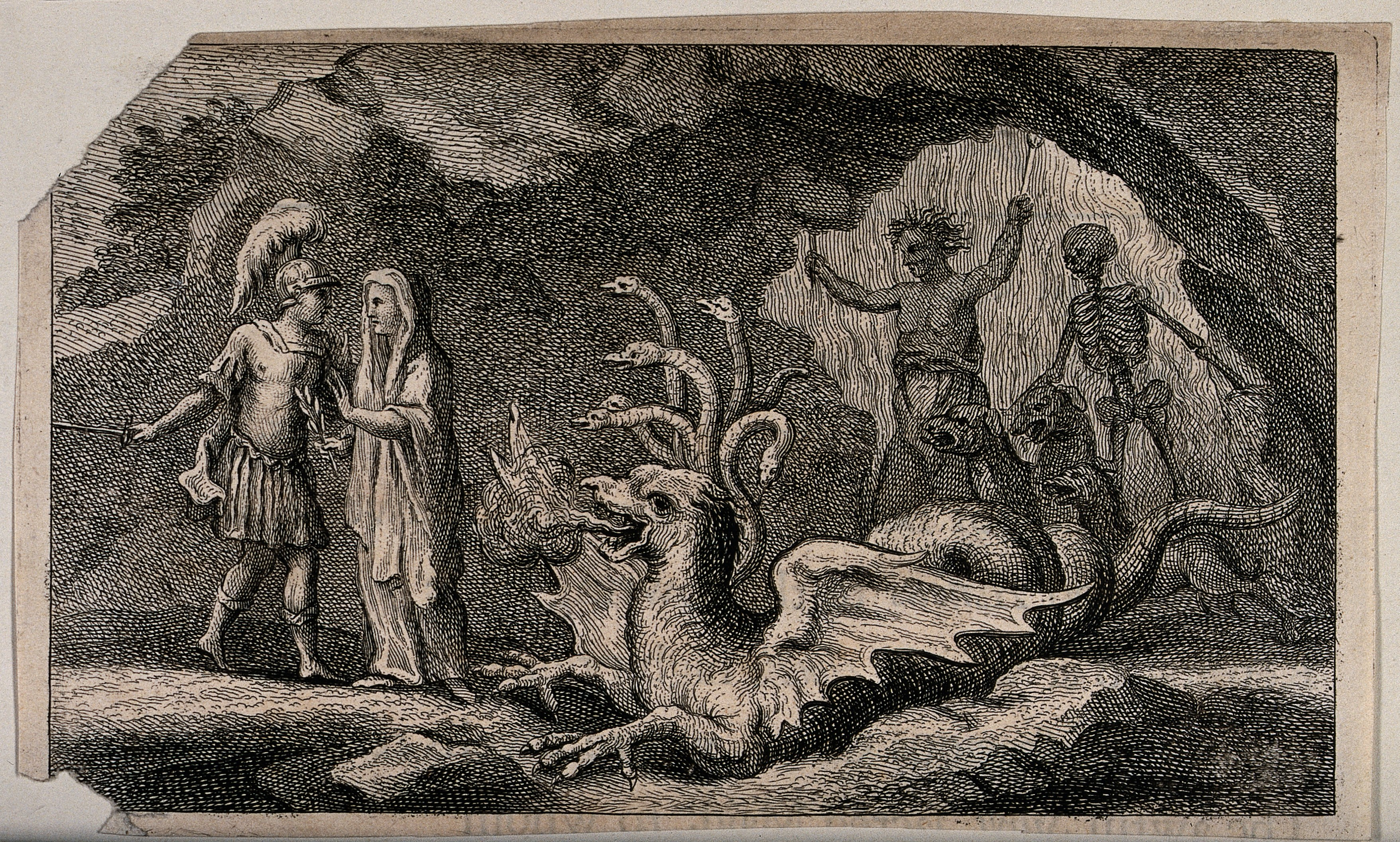
Frodo's encounter with Old Man Willow has been described as a catabasis, a journey into the Underworld, like that of Virgil's hero Aeneas.

The scholar of literature James Obertino comments that "'Every obstacle that arises' in the hero's path 'wears the shadowy features of the Terrible Mother'", who in Aeneas's case is the goddess Juno, in Frodo's "the darkness that is Old Man Willow", along with that of the Barrow-wight and Moria. Obertino likens Frodo's encounters with these darknesses to catabasis, the descent into an underworld, complete with psychological interpretations of personal development, of a hero such as Virgil's Aeneas. He adds that Frodo initially finds comfort in the darkness, "in danger of succumbing to the charm of uroboric incest", as he slumbers beside Old Man Willow, and again in the Barrow-wight's deathly dwelling-place.

E. L. Risden states that the elimination of the Ring and Sauron along with his servants the Ringwraiths and Saruman removed the most powerful sources of evil in the world. Others like Old Man Willow were not removed, "but they too will now fade into quietness. The remaining world, blander, has more narrowly circumscribed limits."

== Adaptations: appearing or disappearing ==
Old Man Willow with the four Hobbits, two of them trapped inside the tree, in the 1991 television play Khraniteli

Old Man Willow, like the Old Forest and Tom Bombadil, was not included in Peter Jackson's films of The Lord of the Rings. Justifying the excision, Jackson asked rhetorically in From Book to Script "So, you know, what does Old Man Willow contribute to the story of Frodo carrying the Ring? ... it's not really advancing our story & it's not really telling us things that we need to know."

Of the earlier adaptations, Terence Tiller's 1955–1956 radio play did include Old Man Willow and Bombadil, in a production not liked by Tolkien, though no recording survives. Morton Zimmerman's unproduced 1957 highly-compressed script, criticised by Tolkien for rushing rather than cutting, similarly included them: Bombadil takes the hobbits straight from Old Man Willow to the Barrow-downs, all the action in the episode seemingly occurring in one day. John Boorman's unproduced c. 1970 script did not include them; the hobbits "getting high on mushrooms" instead. Ralph Bakshi's 1978 animated film omits the Old Forest altogether, setting a precedent for Jackson.

Although the hobbits do not pass through the Old Forest in Jackson's film of The Fellowship of the Ring, the map shown on screen earlier in the film does include Buckland, the Old Forest, and the Barrow-downs. The extended edition DVD of The Two Towers includes a scene with Old Man Willow, although that scene is in Fangorn Forest rather than the Old Forest like the book, and in the DVD the Ent Treebeard is the one who unlocks Old Man Willow, rather than Tom Bombadil. So John D. Rateliff argues that as far as Jackson was concerned, there can have been no Old Man Willow in the mapped Old Forest, and no Bombadil, as the action takes place elsewhere. (Note: The scene is on The Two Towers extended edition, disk 1, from 1 hr 10.15 to 11.04, lasting some 50 seconds.)

Old Man Willow, however, does appear in the Old Forest in the 1991 Soviet television play Khraniteli, where he traps two of the hobbits.
