= Barrow-wight =

Undead monster in J. R. R. Tolkien's Middle-earth

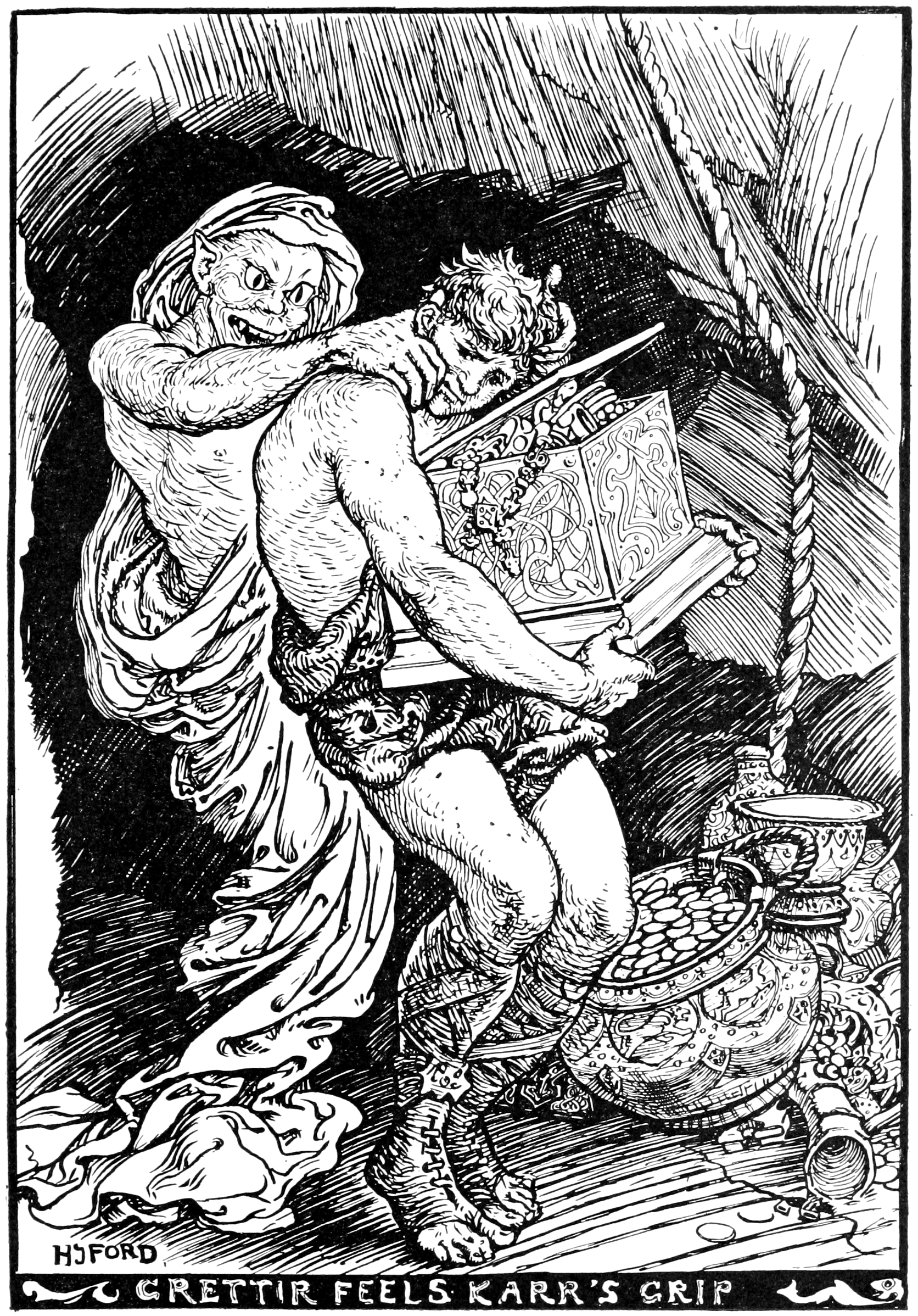
"Grettir feels Kárr's grip": the undead Kárr, a barrow-dweller or haugbúi, attacks the visitor to his barrow. 1902 illustration by Henry Justice Ford

Barrow-wights are wraith-like creatures in J. R. R. Tolkien's world of Middle-earth. In The Lord of the Rings, the four hobbits are trapped by a barrow-wight, and manage to escape. They gain ancient swords of Westernesse for their quest.

Tolkien derived the idea of barrow-wights from Norse mythology, where heroes of several Sagas fight undead beings known as draugrs. Scholars have noted a resemblance, too, between the breaking of the barrow-wight's spell and the final battle in Beowulf, where the dragon's barrow is entered and the treasure released from its spell. Barrow-wights do not appear in Peter Jackson's film trilogy. They do feature in video games based on Tolkien's Middle-earth.

== Origins ==
A barrow is a burial mound, such as was used in Neolithic times.

A wight, from Old English: wiht, is a person or other sentient being.

There are tales of wights, called vǣttr or draugr, undead grave-spirits with bodies, in Norse mythology. In Norway, country people in places such as Eidanger considered that the dead went on living in their tombs as vetter or protective spirits, and up to modern times continued to offer sacrifices on the grave-mounds.

Tolkien stated in his "Nomenclature of The Lord of the Rings" that "barrow-wight" was an "invented name", rather than one like "orc" that existed in Old English. (Note: Tolkien 2005, p. 753) He explained further in a lecture on Beowulf that orcneas ("hell-corpses"), the evil monsters born of Cain and leading to the monster Grendel, meant: (Note: Tolkien 2014b, pp. 163–164)

that terrible northern imagination to which I have ventured to give the name 'barrow-wights'. The 'undead'. Those dreadful creatures that inhabit tombs and mounds. They are not living: they have left humanity, but they are 'undead'. With superhuman strength and malice they can strangle men and rend them. Glámr in the story of Grettir the Strong is a well-known example.

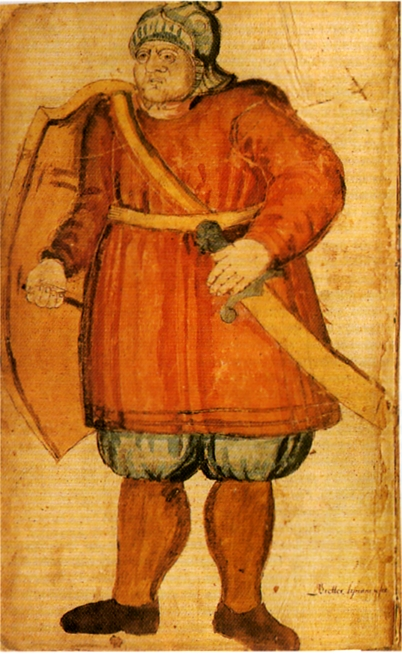
In the Grettis saga, Grettir (pictured) fights Kárr, an undead who guards his own barrow. 17th-century Icelandic manuscript

However, the term was used by Andrew Lang in his 1891 Essays in Little, where he wrote "In the graves where treasures were hoarded the Barrowwights dwelt, ghosts that were sentinels over the gold." Eiríkr Magnússon and William Morris used it, too, in their 1869 translation of Grettis saga, which features a fight with the "barrow-wight" or "barrow-dweller", Kárr:

Everything in their way was kicked out of place, the barrow-wight setting on with hideous eagerness; Grettir gave back before him for a long time, till at last it came to this, that he saw it would not do to hoard his strength any more; now neither spared the other, and they were brought to where the horse-bones were, and thereabout they wrestled long. And now one, now the other, fell on his knee; but the end of the strife was, that the barrow-dweller fell over on his back with huge din.

The Grettis Saga further links the defeat of the barrow-wight to the recovery of an ancient treasure, which comes to the sight of the heir of the house to which it had once belonged:

Grettir ... cast down on the table all the treasure he had taken in the barrow; but one matter there was thereof, on which he must needs keep his eyes; this was a short sword, so good a weapon, that a better, he said, he had never seen; and this he gave up the last of all. Thorfinn was blithe to see that sword, for it was an heirloom of his house, and had never yet gone out of his kin.

"Whence came these treasures to thine hand?" said Thorfinn.

The Grettis Saga calls the undead monsters Glámr and Kárr haugbúar ("mound-dwellers", singular haugbúi; a similar term is draugr). It influenced Tolkien's barrow-wights, whether directly from the Old Norse or by way of Magnússon and Morris's translation.

Barrow-wights have appeared in Scandinavian literature in the modern era, for instance in the Swedish poet Carl Michael Bellman's 1791 song no. 32 Träd fram du Nattens Gud ("Step forth, thou god of night"), whose second stanza runs (translated):

Your quilt covers everything... Look at Flora's gardens!
Here the most beautiful heights flee, there dark Barrow-wights (griftevårdar)
stand on black hills;
and under owls' crying moles, snakes, and martens
leave their chambers.

Both the barrow-wight and the character Tom Bombadil first appeared in Tolkien's writings in his poem The Adventures of Tom Bombadil, published in the Oxford Magazine of 15 February 1934. (Note: Tolkien 2014, p. 123)

== Lord of the Rings narrative ==
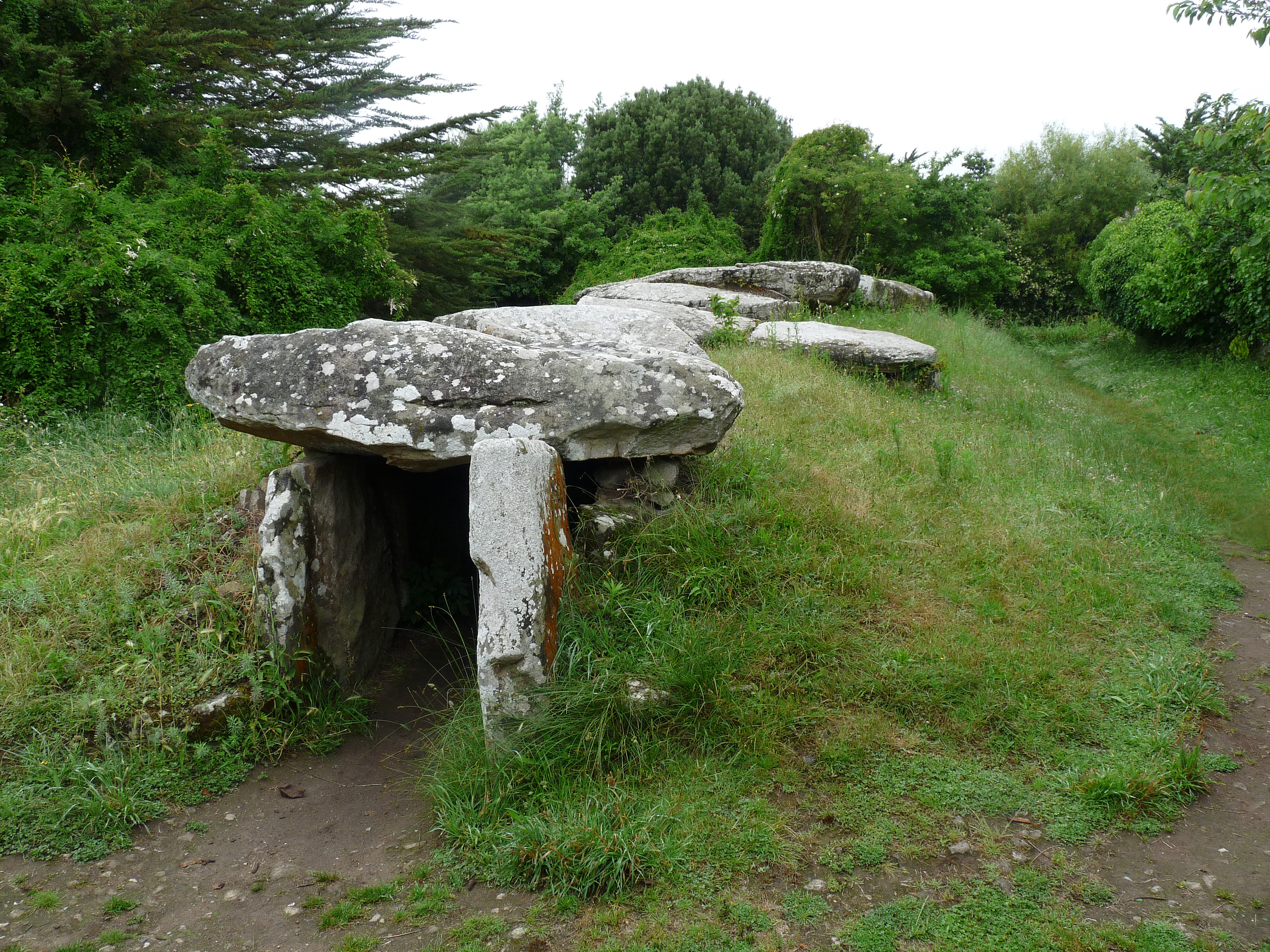
"Two huge standing stones" like a doorway: (Note: Tolkien 1954a, book 1, ch. 8 "Fog on the Barrow-downs") A long barrow, the dolmen at Locmariaquer, Brittany. The chamber is a passage with wider places for burials and grave-goods.

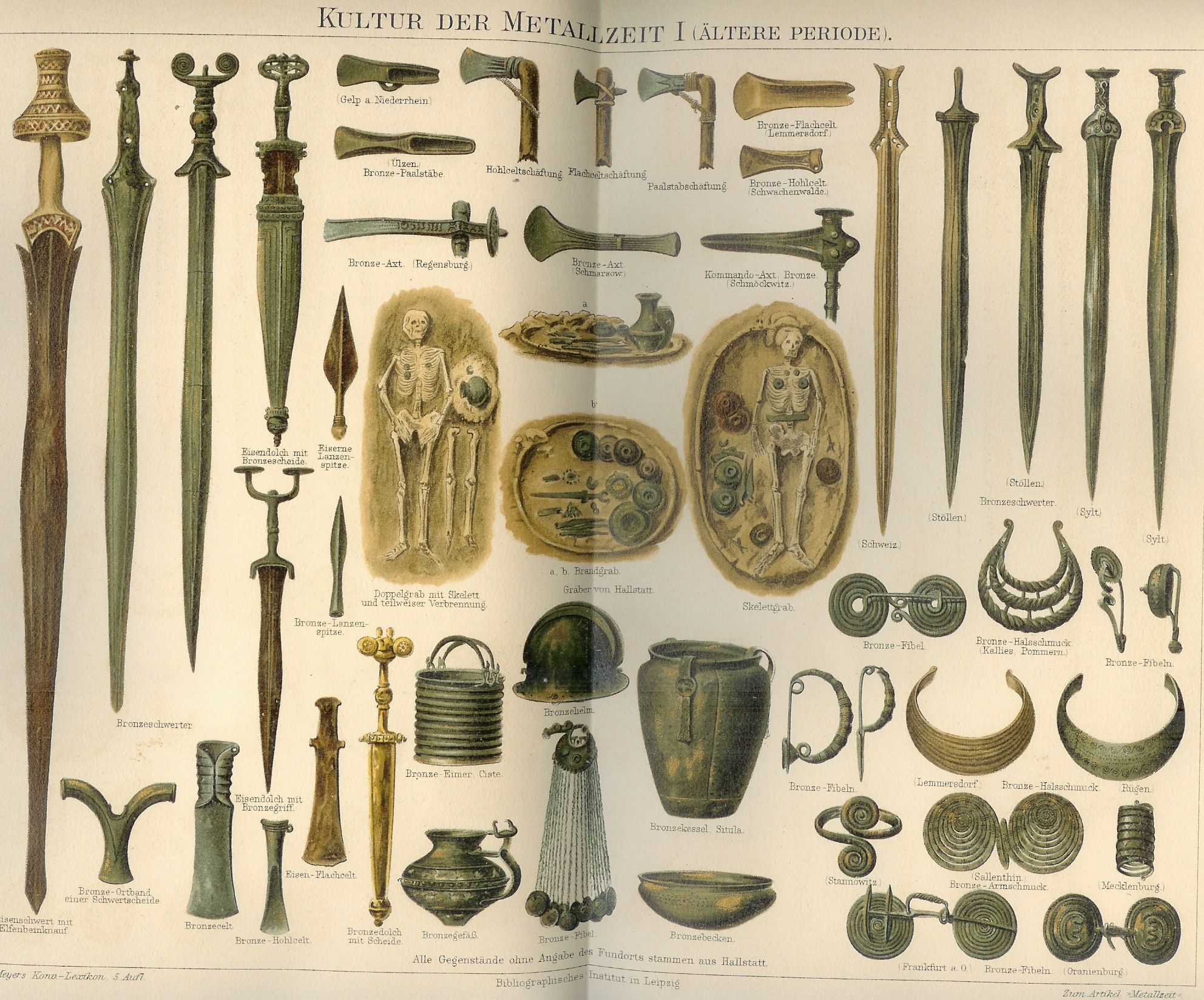
Grave goods such as leaf-shaped swords are found in the Hallstatt culture of the Late Bronze Age in Europe.

Evil spirits were sent to the Barrow-downs by the Witch-king of Angmar to prevent the restoration of the destroyed Dúnedain kingdom of Cardolan, one of three remnants of the Dúnedain Kingdom of Arnor. (Note: Tolkien 1955, Appendix A, "The Númenorean Kings", "Eriador, Arnor, and the Heirs of Isildur") They animated the dead bones of the Dúnedain, as well as older bones of Edain from the First Age, which still were buried there.

After leaving Tom Bombadil, Frodo Baggins and company are trapped in the Barrow-downs, and nearly killed by a barrow-wight:

Suddenly he saw, towering ominous before him and leaning slightly towards one another like the pillars of a headless door, two huge standing stones... He had passed between them almost before he was aware: and even as he did so darkness seemed to fall round him.

Frodo manages to resist the wight's spell; looking about, he sees the other hobbits dressed in grave-goods, in thin white clothes with gold circlets and chains, swords and shields around them, and a sword lying across their necks. He seizes a small sword and cuts off the wight's hand. When the wight extinguishes the dim light in the cavern, Frodo calls for Tom Bombadil, who expels the wight from the barrow, rescues the hobbits, and recovers the wight's treasure-hoard, which included ancient Númenórean swords. Frodo sees the separated hand continuing to wriggle by itself.

The cairn was that of the last prince of Cardolan; Merry's exclamation on waking from his trance confirms this, as he names Carn Dûm, capital of the Witch-Kingdom of Angmar, continually at war with the Númenórean realms (and as Bombadil later explains):

Of course, I remember! The men of Carn Dûm came on us at night, and we were worsted. Ah! The spear in my heart!

Bombadil arms the hobbits from the barrow-wight's hoard with what become known as barrow-blades:

For each of the hobbits he chose a dagger, long, leaf-shaped, and keen, of marvellous workmanship, damasked with serpent-forms in red and gold. They gleamed as he drew them from their black sheaths, wrought of some strange metal, light and strong, and set with many fiery stones. Whether by some virtue in these sheaths or because of the spell that lay on the mound, the blades seemed untouched by time, unrusted, sharp, glittering in the sun.

When, much later, Pippin offers his service to the Steward of Gondor, Denethor, the old man examines his sword and asks "Whence came this? ... Many, many years lie on it. Surely this is a blade wrought by our own kindred in the North in the deep past?" (Note: Tolkien 1955, book 5, ch. 1 "Minas Tirith")

== Analysis ==
The Tolkien scholar Tom Shippey comments that it is a "great moment" when Merry awakens in the barrow from the wight's spell and "remembers only a death not his own". He observes that Merry has taken on the warrior's personality, not that of the wight, since Tom recalls the dead with affection. That leaves, Shippey writes, the question of who or what the wight was as a mystery. The deathly-white robes, the writhing hand, the hobbits arrayed for death, give the thrill of fantasy, but this is given solidity by being tied into a wider history which is at least hinted at.

The scholar of literature Patrick Callahan notes that the whole Bombadil episode seems disconnected from the rest of the story, but that the barrow-wight story resembles the final fight in Beowulf, when the king, now old, goes out to do battle with the barrow-dragon. He dies, but the funeral-barrow's treasure is recovered and the curse on it is broken, just as with the barrow-wight's. Callahan observes, too, that the barrow-wight belongs to "the class of revenants, or 'walking dead'", as in the Grettis saga which Tolkien knew.

== In contemporary media ==
Peter Jackson omitted barrow-wights from his The Lord of the Rings film trilogy. The humanities scholar Brian Rosebury argues that the removal is acceptable to reduce running time, because the episode does not fundamentally change the story. On the other hand, the Tolkien scholar John D. Rateliff notes that, since the Hobbits failed to acquire ancient blades from the barrow-wight's hoard, they awkwardly receive their swords from their travel-companion Aragorn on Weathertop as the party is threatened with imminent attack; he coincidentally happens to be carrying four Hobbit-sized swords with him, despite only expecting to meet Frodo and Sam.

Despite their omission from the film trilogy, Barrow-wights appear in games such as The Lord of the Rings Roleplaying Game. A barrow-wight features in the low-budget 1991 Russian adaptation of The Fellowship of the Ring, Khraniteli, apparently the first moving picture to include the character.

Barrow-wights have appeared in the second season of The Lord of the Rings: The Rings of Power. VFX supervisor Jason Smith described their adaptation as "ancient, reanimated heroes, acting for evil against their will." Smith further noted that their character design would reflect their noble status in life as "[k]ings, queens, high-ranking officials", contrasted by their "glowing blue eyes, piercing through the dark". The Rings of Power VFX team took the opportunity to reflect on Tolkien's writings, with Smith stating, "The feeling the passages give you is of a doom that is approaching, not by speed but by being indefatigable.... It's a menace that is just going to encroach an inch at a time until you have nowhere to go and you die."
