= Isabelle Pantin =

French literary scholar

Isabelle Pantin (born 1952, née Carteron) is a French literary scholar, historian of science, and expert on Renaissance literature, scientific publications from the Renaissance, and the works of J. R. R. Tolkien. She is a professor emerita of literature and language at the École normale supérieure (Paris).

== Education and career ==
Pantin received a diploma from the École normale supérieur in 1972. She worked as a resident at the Bibliothèque nationale de France, and directed the libraries of the ENS Jourdan and Montrouge campuses from 1985 to 1989. She became a lecturer at Sorbonne Nouvelle University from 1989 to 1995, and then a professor at Le Mans University and Paris Nanterre University before returning to the École normale supérieur as a professor in 2007. She was deputy director of the Institut d'histoire moderne et contemporaine, a joint research institute of CNRS, the ENS, and Paris 1 Panthéon-Sorbonne University, from 2013 to 2017.

== Books ==
Pantin is the author of:

- La Poésie du ciel en France dans la seconde moitié du seizième siècle (Geneva: Droz, 1995)
- Tolkien et ses légendes. Une expérience en fiction (Paris: CNRS Éditions, 2009)

She is the editor of critical editions and translations (from Latin into French) of:

- Imprimeurs et libraires parisiens du XVI e siècle (Paris: Bibliothèque nationale, 1986)
- Galileo Galilei, Sidereus Nuncius/Le Messager céleste (Paris: Les Belles Lettres, 1992)
- Johannes Kepler, Dissertatio cum nuncio sidereo; Narratio de observatis Jovis satellitibus: Discussion avec le messager céleste; Rapport sur l'observation des satellites de Jupiter (Paris: Les Belles Lettres, 1993)
- La Mariane du Filomène (1596; with Nicole Cazauran, Paris: Klinck-sieck, 1998)

Her edited volumes include:

- Mise en forme des savoirs à la Renaissance. A la croisée des idées, des techniques et des publics (with Gérald Péoux, Paris: Armand Colin, 2013)

== Recognition ==
Pantin was elected corresponding member of the International Academy of the History of Science in 2007, before becoming full member in 2016. A festschrift, D'Uranie à Gollum : mélanges en l'honneur d'Isabelle Pantin, edited by Jean-Charles Monferran, Tristan Vigliano, and Alice Vintenon, was published by Honoré Champion in 2024.
