= Old Forest =

Fictional forest in J.R.R. Tolkien's Middle-earth

- J. R. R. Tolkien's legendarium location

In-universe information
- Type: A remnant of the primordial forests of Eriador
- Ruled by: Tom Bombadil
- Locations: the Withywindle
- Location: East of the Shire

In J. R. R. Tolkien’s fictional universe of Middle-earth, the Old Forest was a daunting and ancient woodland just beyond the eastern borders of the Shire. Its first and main appearance in print was in the chapter of the 1954 The Fellowship of the Ring titled "The Old Forest". (Note: Tolkien 1954a, book 1, ch. 6 "The Old Forest") The hobbits of the Shire found the forest hostile and dangerous; the nearest, the Bucklanders, planted a great hedge to border the forest and cleared a strip of land next to it. A malign tree-spirit, Old Man Willow, grew beside the River Withywindle in the centre of the forest, controlling most of it, though Tom Bombadil presides over the forest.

The scholar Verlyn Flieger has observed that the hostility of the Old Forest and of Old Man Willow contradicts Tolkien's otherwise protective stance for wild nature. Scholars have discussed the symbolism of the Old Forest, likening it to "Old England", and, given that the protagonist Frodo Baggins calls it "the shadowed land", to Death.

== Fictional role ==
=== Overview ===
The Old Forest lay near the centre of Eriador, a large region of north-west Middle-earth. It was one of the few survivors of the primordial forests which had covered much of Eriador before the Second Age. Indeed, it had once been but the northern edge of one immense forest which reached all the way to Fangorn forest, hundreds of miles to the south-east. (Note: Tolkien 1954a, book 2, ch. 2 "The Council of Elrond")

The vicinity of the Old Forest was the domain of three nature-spirits: Tom Bombadil, Goldberry, and Old Man Willow. The powers of these beings doubtless contributed to its survival when other forests were destroyed.

Old Man Willow, along with the Barrow-wight and Tom Bombadil himself, first appeared in Tolkien's narrative poem The Adventures of Tom Bombadil, where Old Man Willow trapped Bombadil himself briefly. (Note: The Adventures of Tom Bombadil, The Oxford Magazine, 15 February 1934) Willow is portrayed as a sentient and evil willow tree with powers including hypnosis and the ability to move his roots and trunk. Some characters of the story speculate that he may have been related to the Ents, or possibly the Huorns. However, unlike Ents or Huorns, he is portrayed more like a tree, with roots in the ground, and without the ability to move from place to place. Tom Bombadil had power over Old Man Willow, and checked the evil as much as he could, or was willing. (Note: Tolkien 1954a, book 1, ch. 7 "In the House of Tom Bombadil")

According to Tom Bombadil, at the dawn of time, long before even the Awakening of the Elves, trees were the only inhabitants of vast stretches of the world. Because the Elves awoke far in the East, it was still a considerable time before any other beings spread into the vast primeval forests of western Middle-earth. A handful of trees survived from this time until the present day, who are angered at the encroachment of Elves and Men and their dominion over the earth; trees who bitterly remember a time long ago when they were as Lords of vast regions of the world. Bombadil relates that of the corrupted trees of the Old Forest, "none were more dangerous than the Great Willow; his heart was rotten, but his strength was green; and he was cunning, and a master of winds, and his song and thought ran through the woods on both sides of the river. His grey thirsty spirit drew power out of the earth and spread like fine root-threads in the ground, and invisible twig-fingers in the air, till it had under its dominion nearly all the trees of the Forest from the Hedge to the Downs."

In the First Age, Tom Bombadil "was here before the river and the trees". In the Spring of Arda, plants emerge, (Note: Tolkien 1977, ch. 1 "Of the Beginning of Days") possibly including Old Man Willow. In the Years of the Trees, Elves skirted the forest on their primeval migration to Beleriand and the West; they were observed by Bombadil.

By the time Sauron had been defeated and driven from Eriador, most of its old forests had already been destroyed, (Note: Tolkien 1980, part 2, ch 4. Appendix D) leaving remnants such as the Old Forest. (Other vestiges included Woody End in the Shire, Chetwood in Bree-land, and Eryn Vorn in Minhiriath.) The Old Forest was now "hostile to two legged creatures because of the memory of many injuries." (Note: Carpenter 2023, #339 to the editor of The Daily Telegraph, 30 June 1972)

=== Geography, flora and fauna ===
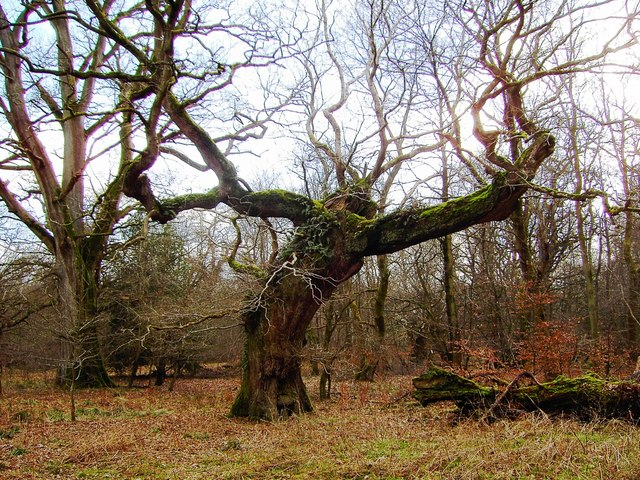
An old oak in Savernake Forest, Wiltshire, England. English oak woods provided the inspiration for the Old Forest

The Old Forest was about 1,000 square miles in area (some 2,600 km^{2}). (Note: Based on the fold-out map of "The West of Middle-earth" in the 1st edition of Unfinished Tales (hardback). This map has a larger scale than the equivalent map in The Lord of the Rings.) It was bordered on the east by the Barrow-downs, a hilly area dotted with ancient burial mounds, where Frodo's party encountered the Barrow-wight. In the north it reached towards the Great East Road, and in the west and south it approached the Brandywine river. The Withywindle, a tributary of the Brandywine, ran through the heart of the forest, which covered most of the Withywindle's drainage basin.

This was also a 'catchment area' in another sense. The landscape, trees and bushes were aligned so that if any strangers attempted to traverse the forest, then they were funnelled towards the Withywindle, and into the clutches of Old Man Willow in particular. The valley of the Withywindle within the Old Forest was known as the Dingle. (Note: Tolkien 2014, Preface)

The Old Forest was a type of woodland nowadays described as temperate broadleaf and mixed forest. The west and south of the forest was dominated by "oaks and ashes and other strange trees", which were generally replaced by pines and firs in the north. Beeches (Note: Tolkien 2014, poem 2 verse 1) and alders (Note: Tolkien 2014, poem 2 verse 5) were found here and there in the forest, and willows were dominant along the Withywindle.

Many of the trees were covered "with moss and slimy, shaggy growths". The understorey was congested with bushes and other undergrowth, including brambles. A variety of plants grew in the forest's occasional glades: grass, hemlocks, wood-parsley, fire-weed, nettles and thistles.

=== Hobbits and the Old Forest ===
In one of his letters, Tolkien explained that "the Old Forest was hostile to two-legged creatures because of the memory of many injuries." When Gorhendad Oldbuck and his clan of Hobbits settled Buckland, they began to encroach upon the Old Forest, thus re-awakening the hostility that had first been aroused back in the Second Age. The settlers soon found themselves under threat from the forest. They felt that the trees of the Old Forest were in some manner 'awake', and were hostile. The trees swayed when there was no wind and whispered at night, and they daunted intruding hobbits by tripping them, dropping branches, and driving them deeper into the forest. Deep within the Old Forest was the Withywindle Valley, the root of all the terrors of the forest; it could be a dark, evil and malevolent place.

The Bucklanders therefore planted and maintained a great Hedge (also known as the High Hay) all the way along Buckland's eastern border, which ran right along the edge of the forest. This had occurred "many generations" before the War of the Ring. (Note: Tolkien 1954a, book 1, ch. 5 "A Conspiracy Unmasked")

However at length (but still "long ago" before the War of the Ring), the Bucklanders found that the Hedge was under "attack" by the forest. Trees began to plant themselves against the Hedge and lean over it. To counter this attack, the hobbits cleared a narrow strip of land on the outside of the Hedge, felling and burning many trees. They cleared a space some way inside the forest; this later became known as the Bonfire Glade.

The ruling family of Buckland, the Brandybucks, owned a private gate in the Hedge, through which they occasionally dared the threshold of the Old Forest. (Note: Tolkien 1954a, Prologue §1) They also went in to maintain the cleared strip, which was still in existence during the War of the Ring. At least one non-Brandybuck visited the Old Forest: Farmer Maggot.

The heir of the Brandybucks during the War of the Ring was Merry Brandybuck: a member of the Fellowship of the Ring. He had been into the Old Forest "several times", and had a key to the gate. On Merry's advice, Frodo Baggins (the bearer of the One Ring) decided to attempt a traversal of the dreadful forest in order to evade the pursuit of Black Riders.

=== Old Man Willow ===
Old Man Willow, drawn by Tolkien while he was writing the chapter on the Old Forest. A face can just be made out on the right-hand side of the tree above the arm-like branch.

Old Man Willow is a malign tree-spirit of great age in Tom Bombadil's Old Forest, appearing physically as a large willow tree beside the River Withywindle, but spreading his influence throughout the forest. He casts a spell on the hobbits, trapping two of them; they are rescued by Tom Bombadil. Bombadil explains that the tree was wholly evil, and had grown to control most of the Old Forest. Tolkien made a drawing of Old Man Willow, from an unpollarded tree by the river in Oxford, to support his writing. The evil tree has puzzled critics, as it does not fit with Tolkien's image as an environmentalist "tree-hugger"; others have noted that trees too are seen by Christians as affected by the Biblical Fall of Man.

== Analysis ==
=== Turning to evil ===
The Tolkien scholar Verlyn Flieger has observed that the Old Forest contradicts Tolkien's protective stance for wild nature and his positive views of trees in particular. Indeed, although the Hobbits in The Lord of the Rings had close shaves with the Black Riders, the first real antagonist which they encountered directly is Old Man Willow. She writes also that the Bucklanders cutting and burning of hundreds of trees along the Hedge is not different from the destruction caused by Saruman's orcs in the woods around Orthanc. She notes further that Old Man Willow first appears as "a predatory tree" in the 1934 poem "The Adventures of Tom Bombadil", and that the character is developed in The Lord of the Rings, as documented in The Return of the Shadow. In an early draft from 1938, she writes, the "Willow" tree and the "Old Man" character had not yet become a single "indivisible being". Instead, Tolkien writes of "how that grey thirsty earth-bound spirit had become imprisoned in the greatest Willow of the [Old] Forest." Flieger writes that in this draft and in the 1943 "Manuscript B", Tolkien links "a tree and a spirit, a 'non-incarnate mind'" which is "imprisoned" in an individual tree. She comments that Tolkien solved the problem of how a spirit might become trapped in this way by turning them into a single being, at once a tree and a malevolent spirit. Old Man Willow is accompanied in the Old Forest, she writes, by "trees" that do what ordinary trees do – "dropping branches, sticking up roots", but which appear to be reacting to the presence of the hobbits, "giving an impression of motivation and intent that is enhanced by the ominous crowding that herds the hobbits 'eastwards and southwards, into the heart of the forest'", exactly where they do not wish to go.

Tolkien wrote that all inhabitants of Ea can be corrupted, and even "trees may 'go bad'". (Note: Carpenter 2023, #212 to Rhona Beare, unsent draft, 1958) Matthew Dickerson notes in the J. R. R. Tolkien Encyclopedia that Old Man Willow is a prime example.

=== Other symbolism ===
Tolkien's Old Forest has been compared to "Old England" in John Buchan's 1931 The Blanket of the Dark, where the protagonist Peter Bohun disappears in the English Midlands around Evesham. The West Midlands were beloved by Tolkien because the maternal part of his family, the Suffields, were from this area.

Tom Shippey has proposed that the Old Forest contains a more fundamental symbolism. Frodo, the central protagonist of The Lord of the Rings, describes the forest as "the shadowed land"; Shippey draws on the context to suggest that the forest could be an allusion to Death.

John Garth writes that the name "Old Forest" seems plain, but is "pregnant" with meaning: "Forest" derives from medieval Latin forestem silvam, "the outside wood", in turn from Latin foris, "out of doors". He glosses this as meaning unfenced woodland, noting that the Old Forest is "very emphatically fenced out by a strip of scorched earth and a high hedge, to deter the seemingly mobile trees from invading Buckland".

== Adaptations ==
The forest appears in the video game The Lord of the Rings: The Fellowship of the Ring. In the MMORPG Lord of the Rings Online, a quest to gather lilies for Goldberry at the foot of Old Man Willow is given to the player by Bombadil, who warns that the tree will "sing you right to sleep". Along with the adventure in Crickhollow, Tom Bombadil, and the Barrow-downs, the Old Forest is omitted from Peter Jackson's interpretation of The Lord of the Rings.

== See also ==
- Treebeard, an inhabitant of Fangorn forest.
- Lothlórien, the forest of Galadriel and her elves
- Mirkwood, the forest of the giant spiders
