= Merry Brandybuck =

Fictional character in The Lord of the Rings by J. R. R. Tolkien

Meriadoc Brandybuck
- Middle-earth character

In-universe information
- Aliases: Merry, Master of Buckland
- Race: Hobbit
- Affiliation: Company of the Ring
- Spouse: Estella Bolger
- Book(s): The Lord of the Rings

Meriadoc Brandybuck (Westron: Kalimac Brandagamba; usually called Merry) is a Hobbit, a fictional character from J. R. R. Tolkien's Middle-earth legendarium, featured throughout his most famous work, The Lord of the Rings. Merry is described as one of the closest friends of Frodo Baggins, the main protagonist. Merry and his friend and cousin, Pippin, are members of the Company of the Ring. They become separated from the rest of the group and spend much of The Two Towers making their own decisions. By the time of The Return of the King, Merry has enlisted in the army of Rohan as an esquire to King Théoden, in whose service he fights during the War of the Ring. After the war, he returns home, where he and Pippin lead the Scouring of the Shire, ridding it of Saruman's influence.

Commentators have noted that his and Pippin's actions serve to throw light on the characters of the good and bad lords Théoden and Denethor, Steward of Gondor, while their simple humour acts as a foil for the higher romance involving kings and the heroic Aragorn.

Merry appeared in Ralph Bakshi's animated film Lord of the Rings, the animated version of The Return of the King by Rankin/Bass, and in the live action film series by Peter Jackson.

== Fictional history ==
Meriadoc, a hobbit, known as Merry, was the only child of Saradoc Brandybuck, a Master of Buckland, and Esmeralda (née Took), the younger sister of Paladin Took II, making him a cousin to Paladin's son, his friend Pippin. (Note: Tolkien 1955, Appendix C, "Family Trees") His grandfather Rorimac Brandybuck's sister Primula was the mother of Frodo Baggins, the main protagonist of the book. Merry and Frodo were thus first cousins once removed. Hobbits of the Shire saw Bucklanders as "peculiar, half foreigners as it were"; the Bucklanders were the only hobbits comfortable with boats; and living next to the Old Forest, protected from it only by a high hedge, they locked their doors after dark, unlike hobbits in the Shire. (Note: Tolkien 1954a, book 1, ch. 5 "A Conspiracy Unmasked")

Merry learned of the One Ring and its power of invisibility before Bilbo Baggins left the Shire. He guarded Bag End after Bilbo's party, protecting Frodo from unwanted guests. (Note: Tolkien 1954a, book 1, ch. 1 "A Long-expected Party") Merry was a force behind "the Conspiracy" of Sam, Pippin, Fredegar Bolger and himself to help Frodo. He assembled the company's packs and brought ponies. (Note: Tolkien 1954a, book 1, ch. 4 "A Short Cut to Mushrooms") His shortcut through the Old Forest distanced them from the Black Riders, the Nazgûl, for a time. (Note: Tolkien 1954a, book 1, ch. 6 "The Old Forest") In the Barrow-downs, he is given his sword, a dagger forged in the kingdom of Arthedain. (Note: Tolkien 1954a, book 1, ch. 8 "Fog on the Barrow-downs") Arriving at Bree, Merry was not celebrating in the Prancing Pony when Frodo put on the Ring; he was outside taking a solitary walk, and was nearly overcome by a Nazgûl. (Note: Tolkien 1954a, book 1, ch. 10 "Strider") At Rivendell, he was seen studying maps and plotting their path. Elrond reluctantly admitted him and Pippin to the Company of the Ring. (Note: Tolkien 1954a, book 2, ch. 3 "The Ring goes South")

Halted at the entrance to Moria, Merry asked Gandalf the meaning of the door inscription "Speak, friend, and enter". When Gandalf, having unsuccessfully tried many door-opening spells, discovered the true interpretation, he said "Merry, of all people, was on the right track". (Note: Tolkien 1954a, book 2, ch. 4 "A Journey in the Dark") At Amon Hen, the Hill of Seeing, the Company hesitated in confusion, and scattered. Merry and Pippin were captured by a band of Saruman's Uruk-hai, despite Boromir's defence. (Note: Tolkien 1954, book 3, ch. 3 "The Uruk-hai") Escaping with Pippin into Fangorn forest, they were rescued by the leader of the Ents, Treebeard, and given an Ent-draught to drink: it made them both grow unnaturally tall for hobbits. (Note: Tolkien 1954, book 3, ch. 4 "Treebeard") Accompanying Treebeard to the Entmoot and later to the wizard Saruman's fortress of Isengard, which the Ents destroyed, they took up residence in a gate-house, meeting King Théoden of Rohan, and were reunited with the Fellowship. (Note: Tolkien 1954, book 3, ch. 8 "The Road to Isengard") Merry swore allegiance to Théoden and became his esquire. (Note: Tolkien 1954, book 5, ch. 2 "The Passing of the Grey Company") Against Théoden's orders, he rode to Gondor with the King's niece Éowyn, who disguised herself as a common soldier. (Note: Tolkien 1954a, book 5, ch. 3 "The Muster of Rohan") In the Battle of the Pelennor Fields, while the leader of the Nazgûl was preoccupied with Éowyn, Merry stabbed him behind his knee. The Black Captain stumbled, enabling Éowyn to kill him. This fulfilled the prophecy that he would not be killed "by the hand of man", as it was a hobbit and a woman that ended his life. (Note: Tolkien 1954a, book 5, ch. 6 "The Battle of the Pelennor Fields") Éomer made Meriadoc a Knight of the Mark for his bravery, and gave him the name Holdwine. (Note: Tolkien 1954a, book 6, ch. 6 "Many Partings")

After the War of the Ring, Merry and Pippin returned home as the tallest of hobbits, only to find that Saruman had taken over the Shire. Merry and Pippin roused the hobbits to revolt. During the resulting Scouring of the Shire, Merry commanded the hobbit forces, and killed the leader of Saruman's "ruffians" at the Battle of Bywater. (Note: Tolkien 1954a, book 6 ch. 8 "The Scouring of the Shire") Sometime afterwards, Merry married Estella Bolger. (Note: Tolkien 1955, Appendix C, "Bolger of Budgeford") Merry inherited the title Master of Buckland at the start of the Fourth Age. He became a historian of the Shire. (Note: Tolkien 1954a, Prologue, "Note on the Shire Records") (Note: Tolkien 1954, book 3, ch. 9 "Flotsam and Jetsam") At the age of 102, Merry returned to Rohan and Gondor with Pippin; they died in Gondor, and were laid to rest among the Kings of Gondor in Rath Dínen, the street of tombs, then moved to lie next to Aragorn. His son succeeded him as Master of Buckland. (Note: Tolkien 1955, Appendix B, "Later Events Concerning the Members of the Fellowship of the Ring", entry for 1484)

== Development ==
When Merry first appeared in Tolkien's early drafts, his name was Drogo Took. He was later renamed Vigo, and the name Drogo reassigned to Frodo's father. After that, he was renamed Marmaduke, and finally Meriadoc Brandybuck. (Note: Tolkien 1988, "The First Phase", I. "A Long-expected Party", (iii) "The Third Version")

The name Meriadoc has sometimes been seen as an allusion to the nobleman Conan Meriadoc, legendary founder of the medieval House of Rohan in Brittany, since Tolkien's Meriadoc is closely associated with his fictional kingdom of Rohan. Tolkien denied that the Breton name had any connection with his fictional kingdom. (Note: Carpenter 2023, #297 to Mr. Rang, draft, August 1967) The name Meriadoc is Brittonic (for example, Welsh); Tolkien stated that he had given characters from Bree and Buckland names with a "Celtic cast", so that they appear different from plainly English names in the Shire. (Note: Tolkien 1996, "The Appendix on Languages")

In the prefaces and appendices to The Lord of the Rings, Tolkien employed the conceit that he was the modern translator of a unique manuscript, the Red Book of Westmarch, and that his stories of Middle-earth derived from that. (Note: Tolkien 1954a, book 6, ch. 9 "The Grey Havens") In this guise of translator, he maintained that the character's real name was not Meriadoc Brandybuck, but rather Kalimac Brandagamba. This was said to be an actual phonetic transcription of the name in Tolkien's invented language of Westron, which Tolkien pretended that he was transliterating to English. The nickname "Merry" then represented his actual nickname Kali, meaning "handsome, happy", and "Meriadoc" served as a plausible name from which a nickname meaning "happy" could be derived. (Note: Tolkien 1955, Appendix F, "On Translation") The name given to Merry in the language of Rohan, Holdwine, is based on the Old English for "faithful friend".

== Analysis ==
=== Foils for high romance ===
Merry (right) and Pippin in Ralph Bakshi's animated 1978 version of The Lord of the Rings

The Tolkien scholar Jane Chance discusses the role of Merry and his friend Pippin in illuminating the contrast between the "good and bad Germanic lords Théoden and Denethor". She writes that both leaders receive the allegiance of a hobbit, but very differently: Théoden, King of Rohan, treats Merry with love, which is reciprocated, whereas Denethor, Steward of Gondor, undervalues Pippin because he is small, and binds him with a harsh formal oath.

Merry as voiced by Casey Kasem in the 1980 Rankin/Bass animated version of The Return of the King

The Tolkien scholar Tom Shippey notes that Tolkien uses the two hobbits and their low simple humour as foils for the much higher romance to which he was aspiring with the more heroic and kingly figures of Théoden, Denethor, and Aragorn: an unfamiliar and old-fashioned writing style that might otherwise, Shippey writes, have lost his readers entirely. He notes that Merry and Pippin serve, too, as guides to introduce the reader to seeing the various non-human characters, letting the reader know that an ent looks like an old tree stump or "almost like the figure of some gnarled old man". The two apparently minor hobbits have another role, Shippey writes: it is to remain of good courage when strong men start to doubt whether victory is possible, as when Merry encourages Théoden when even he seems to be succumbing to "horror and doubt".

=== Agent of providence ===
Another purpose, writes the Tolkien critic Paul Kocher, is given by Tolkien himself, in the words of the wizard Gandalf: "the young hobbits ... were brought to Fangorn, and their coming was like the falling of small stones that starts an avalanche in the mountains." Kocher observes that Tolkien is describing Merry and Pippin's role in the same terms as he spells out Gollum's purpose and Gandalf's "reincarnation"; in Kocher's words, the "finger of Providence" can be glimpsed: "All are filling roles written for them by the same great playwright."

Dominic Monaghan as Merry in Peter Jackson's 2003 The Lord of the Rings: The Return of the King

=== Shakespearean prophecy ===
Julaire Andelin, in the J.R.R. Tolkien Encyclopedia, writes that prophecy in Middle-earth depended on characters' understanding of the Music of the Ainur, the divine plan for Arda, and was often ambiguous. Thus, Glorfindel's prophecy "not by the hand of man will [the Lord of the Nazgûl] fall" did not lead the Lord of the Nazgûl to suppose that he would die at the hands of a woman and a hobbit (Merry). (Note: Tolkien 1954a, Appendix A, I, iv "Gondor and the heirs of Anarion") Shippey states that the prophecy, and the Witch-king's surprise at finding Dernhelm to be a woman, parallel the witches' statement to Macbeth that he may "laugh to scorn / The power of man, for none of woman born / Shall harm Macbeth" (Act 4, scene 1), and Macbeth's shock at learning that Macduff "was from his mother's womb / Untimely ripp'd" (as Macduff was born by Caesarean section: Act 5, scene 8). Thus, Shippey notes, despite Tolkien's stated dislike of Shakespeare's treatment of myth, he read Macbeth closely.

== Adaptations ==
In Ralph Bakshi's 1978 animated version of The Lord of the Rings, Merry was voiced by Simon Chandler. In the 1980 Rankin/Bass animated version of The Return of the King, made for television, the character was voiced by the radio personality Casey Kasem. In the 1981 BBC radio serial of The Lord of the Rings, Merry was played by Richard O'Callaghan. He was portrayed by Sergey Shelgunov in the 1991 Russian television play Khraniteli, and by Jarmo Hyttinen in the 1993 Finnish miniseries Hobitit. In Peter Jackson's 2001–2003 film trilogy adaptation of the books, Merry was portrayed by Dominic Monaghan as a cheerful prankster full of fun and practical jokes.
