= Partners in Crime (Doctor Who) =

189 – "Partners in Crime"
- Doctor Who episode
- The Adipose, CGI aliens depicted using MASSIVE, waddle through Central London towards Adipose Industries.

Cast
- Doctor: David Tennant – Tenth Doctor
- Companion: Catherine Tate – Donna Noble
- Others: Billie Piper – Rose Tyler; Sarah Lancashire – Ms. Foster; Bernard Cribbins – Wilfred Mott; Jacqueline King – Sylvia Noble; Verona Joseph – Penny Carter; Jessica Gunning – Stacey Campbell; Martin Ball – Roger Davey; Rachid Sabitri – Craig Staniland; Chandra Ruegg – Claire Pope; Sue Kelvin – Suzette Chambers; Jonathan Stratt – Taxi driver

Production
- Directed by: James Strong
- Written by: Russell T Davies
- Produced by: Phil Collinson
- Executive producers: Russell T Davies; Julie Gardner
- Music by: Murray Gold
- Production code: 4.1
- Series: Series 4
- Running time: 50 minutes
- First broadcast: 5 April 2008

Chronology
| ← Preceded by "Voyage of the Damned" | Followed by → "The Fires of Pompeii" |

"Partners in Crime" is the first episode of the fourth series of the British science fiction television series Doctor Who. It was broadcast on BBC One on 5 April 2008. The episode reintroduced actor and comedian Catherine Tate as Donna Noble, who had previously appeared in the 2006 Christmas Special "The Runaway Bride". In the episode, Donna and the alien time traveller the Tenth Doctor (David Tennant) meet while separately investigating Adipose Industries, a company that has created a revolutionary diet pill. Together, they attempt to stop the death of thousands of people in London after the head of the company, the alien Miss Foster (Sarah Lancashire), creates short white aliens made from human body fat. The episode's alien creatures, the Adipose, were created using the software MASSIVE, commonly used for crowd sequences in fantasy and science fiction films.

"Partners in Crime" features the return of three recurring characters: Jacqueline King reprises her role as Sylvia Noble from "The Runaway Bride"; Bernard Cribbins reprises his role as Wilfred Mott from "Voyage of the Damned", to replace the character of Geoff Noble after actor Howard Attfield died; and Billie Piper briefly reprises her role as Rose Tyler for the first time since the second series' finale "Doomsday" (2006), in a scene that was not included in preview showings.

The episode was received positively by critics. Most reviewers praised the visual effects used to create the Adipose and Tate's subdued acting in comparison to "The Runaway Bride"; Donna was changed from a "shouting fishwife" to a more emotional person when she became a full-time companion. Critics were polarised over the episode's plot: opinion on executive producer Russell T Davies' writing ranged from "pure pleasure" to "the back of a fag packet".

== Plot ==
Donna Noble finds herself regretting her decision to decline the Tenth Doctor's invitation to travel in the TARDIS. (Note: As depicted in the 2006 episode "The Runaway Bride") She has started investigating conspiracy theories, such as certain bees disappearing in the hope that she will find him again. The Doctor and Donna, neither one aware of the other's involvement, both investigate Adipose Industries, which is marketing a special diet pill to the people of London. They find that the pills use latent body fat to parthenogenetically create small white aliens called Adipose that spawn at night and leave the host's body. The Doctor and Donna separately infiltrate the offices of Adipose Industries, each unaware that the other is there. As they explore the building, they suddenly encounter each other through opposite windows in an office. They are confronted by Miss Foster, an alien who is using Britain's overweight population to create the Adipose babies for the Adiposian First Family. Miss Foster pursues the Doctor and Donna around the building, finally catching them in an office. She tells the Doctor that the Adipose lost their breeding planet and hired Miss Foster to find a replacement. The Doctor uses Miss Foster's sonic pen and his sonic screwdriver to create a diversion and escape.

Miss Foster accelerates her plans, knowing that the Doctor will attempt to stop her. Throughout London, the Adipose begin to spawn and soon number several thousand. The Doctor and Donna prevent total emergency parthenogenesis from occurring, which would have killed those who had taken the pill, and the remainder of the young Adipose make their way to Adipose Industries. The Adiposian First Family arrive in a spaceship and begin collecting their young. The Doctor tries to warn Miss Foster about her safety, but she disregards him and is killed when the Adipose drops her from their transport beam to her death, to cover their unsanctioned seeding efforts.

Donna accepts the Doctor's original offer to travel in the TARDIS, but he warns her that having lost two companions who both fell in love with him, he does not want things to get complicated again. To his surprise and relief, Donna proclaims that she is not physically or romantically attracted to him and is happy to just be friends. Donna makes a detour to leave her car keys in a litter bin, telling her mother Sylvia to collect them later. While there, she meets a blonde woman and asks her to help Sylvia find the keys. The woman turns out to be Rose Tyler, who fades from view as she walks away from the area. Donna asks the Doctor to fly the TARDIS past Donna's grandfather Wilfred Mott, who is watching the night sky through a telescope. Donna waves Wilfred off inside the TARDIS.

== Production ==
=== Casting ===
"Partners in Crime" features several actors returning to the series. Catherine Tate was offered the opportunity to return as Donna Noble during lunch with executive producer Julie Gardner. Tate, who expected Gardner would ask about appearing in a biopic, later admitted it was "the furthest thing from [her] mind". Tate's return was controversial amongst Doctor Who fans; the criticism she received was compared to Daniel Craig after he was cast as James Bond. Howard Attfield, who appeared as Donna's father Geoff in "The Runaway Bride", filmed several scenes for this episode, but died before his scenes for the remainder of the season were completed. The producers retired his character out of respect, and dedicated him in the closing credits for the episode. Producer Phil Collinson suggested transferring his traits to the unrelated character Stan Mott from "Voyage of the Damned", and rewriting his role as Donna's grandfather. Executive producers Russell T Davies and Gardner liked the idea and recalled Bernard Cribbins to the role to re-film Attfield's scenes, with the character renamed as Wilfred—a name Davies favoured for Donna's grandfather—in time for the credits of "Voyage of the Damned" to be changed.

=== Writing ===
I see her as a slightly warped Mary Poppins. She's quite austere. She's a strong woman. When I first read the script, I thought, oh, well, of course she's a baddie... but the more I read it, I thought, 'No, she's doing what she's doing for legitimate reasons.'

— Sarah Lancashire

Davies took a different approach while writing the episode. David Tennant and Sarah Lancashire noted the character of Miss Foster had good intentions but was morally ambiguous. The premise of the Adipose pill was equally ambiguous with rare side-effects, but was a "win-win situation" for anyone involved. Davies based the character of Miss Foster on Supernanny star Jo Frost and Argentine philanthropist and politician Eva Perón, and Lancashire compared her character to Mary Poppins. The Adipose are a different style to regular Doctor Who villains; antagonists such as Lazarus in "The Lazarus Experiment" or the werewolf in "Tooth and Claw" were singular monsters designed to scare the audience; the Adipose were written as "cute" to provide a "bizarre [and] surreal" experience.

Davies made some changes to Donna's character. The character was "rounded ... out from being a shouting fishwife to someone who's quite vulnerable and emotional". Donna was written to provide a "caustic" and "grown-up" attitude towards the Doctor, in opposition to Rose and Martha, who fell in love with him. Tate considered Donna to be more equal to the Doctor because her character did not romanticise him, allowing her to question his morality more easily.

=== Filming ===
Location of Adipose Industries

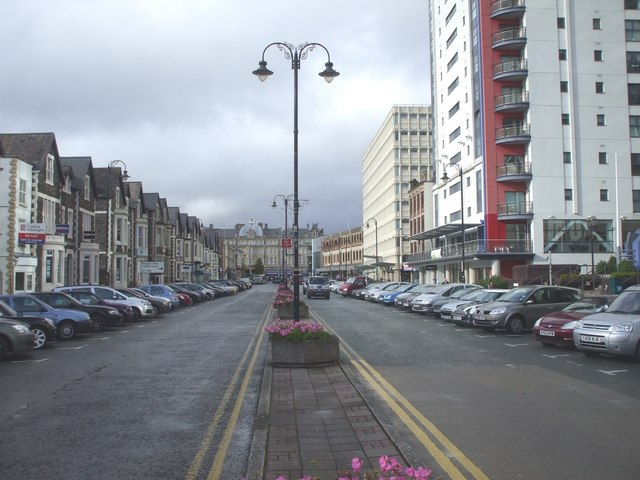
Churchill Way, Cardiff

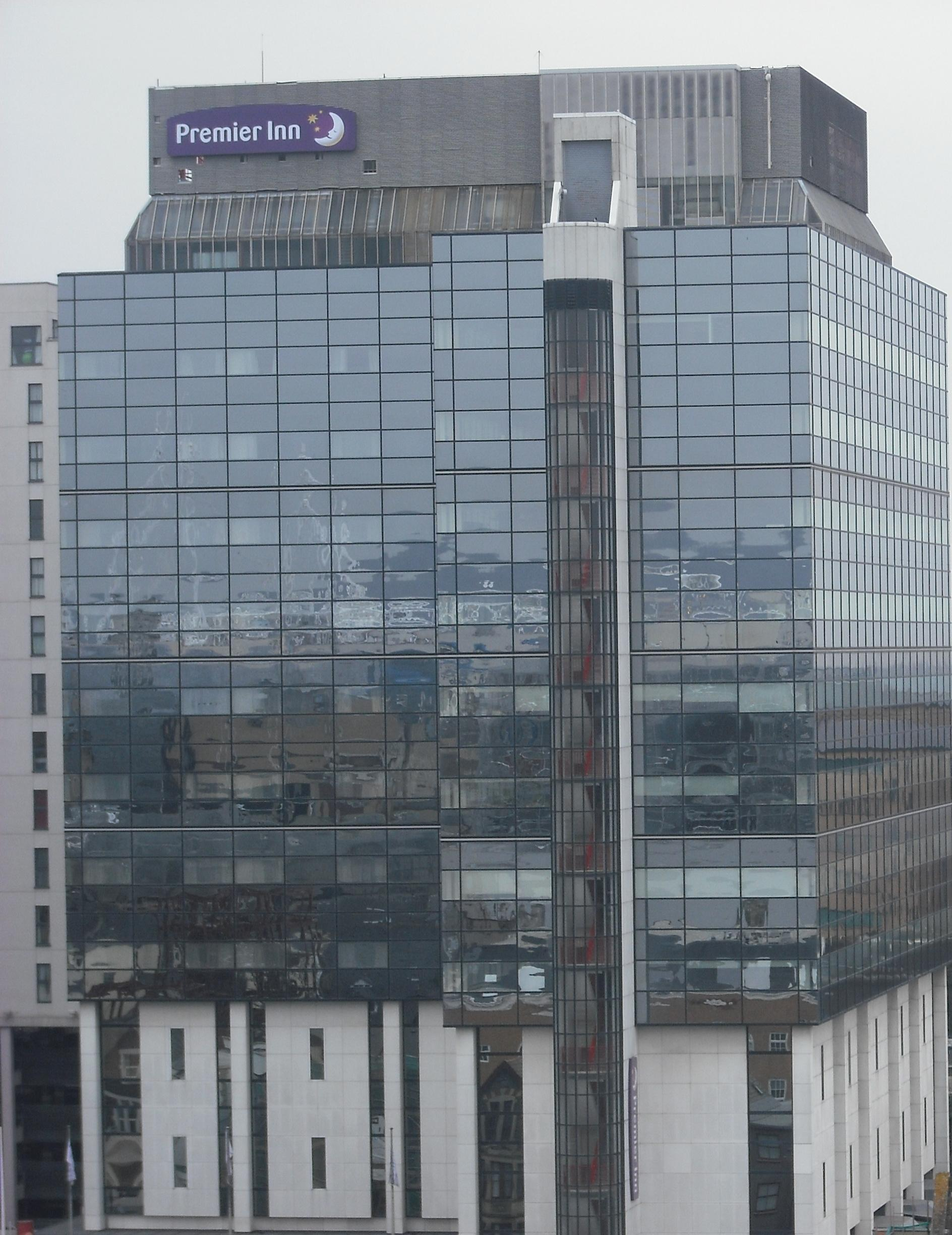
Helmont House

The episode was in the fourth production block in the season, and was filmed in October 2007. The out-of-sequence filming allowed producers to use props to "seed" later episodes; ATMOS, a plot device in the episodes "The Sontaran Stratagem" and "The Poison Sky", is referred to by a sticker on a taxi's windscreen. As the episode mostly takes place at night, many scenes were filmed in the early morning.

The scene where Donna and the Doctor investigate Adipose was difficult to film. The scene took thirty shots to complete, and Tennant and Tate experienced problems avoiding each other on-screen. The scene was filmed in Picture Finance's call centre on the outskirts of Newport on an early Sunday morning, with the company's telephonists serving as extras.

Exterior shots of Adipose Industries were filmed at the British Gas building (Helmont House) in Cardiff's city centre. For health and safety reasons, Tennant was prohibited from performing his own stunts in the window cleaning platform. His only shot that required stunts was when he catches Miss Foster's sonic pen, a shot that took several takes to perfect.

=== Adipose ===
The Adipose were inspired by a stuffed toy Davies owned. The name comes from the scientific name for body fat, adipose tissue. Davies' brief outlined a "cute" child-friendly creature shaped like a block of lard, similar to the Pillsbury Doughboy. Further consultation with post-production team The Mill resulted in the ears and the single fang each Adipose has. Stephen Regelous, who won an Academy Award for his software Massive, flew to London to supervise the creation of the crowd special effects. Regelous, a Doctor Who fan, was enthusiastic about helping The Mill with special effects, stating that "When I first found out that the Mill was working on Doctor Who, I was quietly hoping that Massive might be used to create hordes of Daleks or Cybermen and with series 4, I jumped at the opportunity to be involved." The Mill created two types of Adipose: extras with artificial intelligence and independent movement, and "hero" Adipose, which were hand-animated.

== Broadcast and reception ==
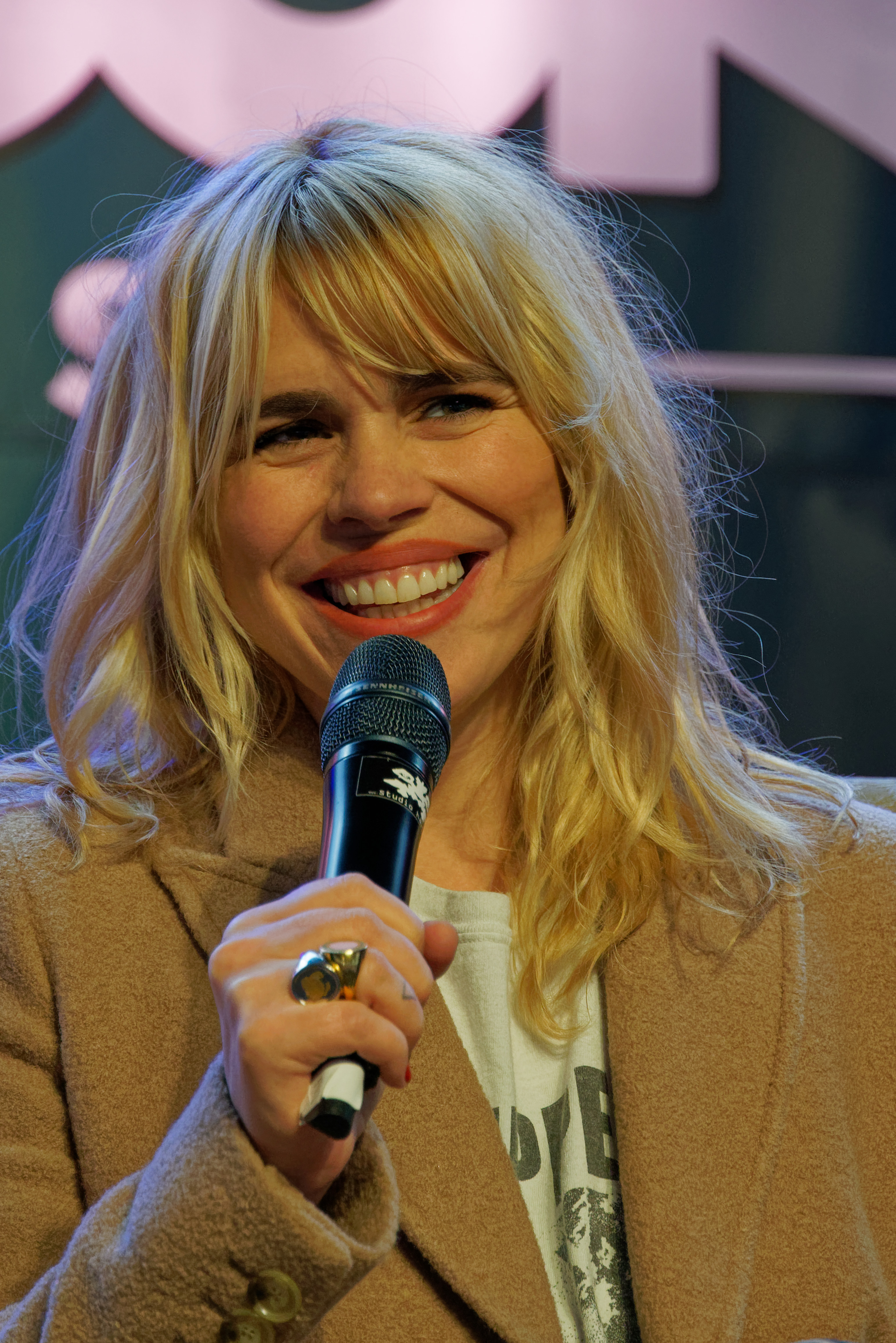
Tennant described Billie Piper's return as a "genuine prickle up the spine".

=== Broadcast and ratings ===
The episode was broadcast on 5 April 2008 at 18:20, the earliest timeslot since the show's revival in 2005. Davies criticised the BBC's scheduling department and claimed the show could lose 1.5 million viewers. The show retained a similar time of broadcast for a further four episodes, before returning to around 19:00. from "The Doctor's Daughter" onwards.

The preview version of the episode supplied to the press and aired at the press launch omitted the scene that features Rose; before broadcast, only the production team, Tate, and Tennant had seen the scene. The scene contains Rose's departure theme, "Doomsday". Tennant commented "on the night of transmission ... the Radio Times won't have told you it's coming, it'll come as a genuine [...] prickle up the spine".

Overnight figures estimated the show was watched by 8.4 million viewers, with a peak of 8.7 million, 39.4% of the television audience. The consolidated rating was 9.1 million viewers. Doctor Who was therefore the most watched show on 5 April, although the Grand National had a higher peak with 10.1 million viewers. The episode's Appreciation Index was 88 (considered "Excellent"), the highest for any television show aired on 5 April.

=== Critical reception ===
The episode received many positive reviews. John Preston, writing for The Daily Telegraph, called the episode an "undiluted triumph". Opening his review, he said "last night's episode struck me as being as close to 50 minutes of pure pleasure as you're likely to get on television". He noted the episode's clever tackling of the topical theme of obesity, and its mixture of emotion and special effects. In closing, he said "the dejected critic, denied even the smallest nit to pick, walks glumly away". Scott Matthewman of The Stage lamented that the Adipose was not threatening enough. He liked the Adipose's execution of Miss Foster, a "momentary pause in mid-air, gravity only kicking in when the character looks down", comparing it to Wile E. Coyote and Chuck Jones, which "[was] a nice little touch in an episode ... full of them". He also appreciated Tate, saying that "David Tennant finally has a partner who is approaching an equal". Sam Wollaston of The Guardian wrote that Tate was "not right for this role" and "too hysterical, too comedy, not cool enough", and felt her inclusion was an attempt to trade on the popularity of her own series and "broaden the appeal of [Dr Who] still further". He also found the music "a bit oppressive" but concluded that, despite these criticisms, the show was "still awfully nice television". Keith Watson of Metro gave the episode 4 stars out of 5. He admitted that despite his dislike of Tate, "she isn't that bad". His review of the Adipose was positive, citing them as a reason of the quality of the show. Closing, he said "it split [his] sides".

Jon Wise of The People said "Doctor Who is a super-galactic way of spending a Saturday night indoors", and appreciated that Donna was not romantically interested in the Doctor, unlike Martha or Rose. Ben Rawson-Jones gave the episode a wholly positive review, summarising it as containing "pure fantastic family fun, delivering a winning blend of action, comedy, poignancy and one unexpected shock cameo".

The episode received several negative reviews. Andrew Billen, writing for The Times, lamented that Davies had "forgotten that Doctor Who's main task is to send children scuttling behind sofas while entertaining their fathers with the odd philosophical idea, the occasional classical reference, a joke or two they would probably not wish to explain and a wee bit of space totty". Billen also criticised the writing and acting, but commended Tate for a "toned down performance". Alan Stanley Blair of SyFy Portal summarised it as "a runaway Saturday morning cartoon in desperate need to a solid story". Blair found flaws with the comedy and the music in the episode, but was impressed with Tate's acting and Piper's cameo. Kevin O'Sullivan of the Sunday Mirror criticised Tate and Tennant for overacting, and had concerns about the writing: "It didn't exactly ooze tension. All we got in the way of terrifying space enemies was Sarah Lancashire hamming it up as an intergalactic super nanny, a couple of security guards with guns and lots of cute little fat babies." Ian Hyland of News of the World criticised the child-friendly storyline, comparing it to "the back of a fag packet". He also criticised Tennant for appearing "jaded" and Tate for "still shouting".

Reviewing in 2022, Mark Braxton for Radio Times described the return of Tate as a "casting coup", and opined that Donna and the Doctor paired better than previous matchups in the series. Graphics-wise, Braxton noted that the CGI used for the Adipose had not aged well, but that the graphics work for the spaceship was done better. He also positively reviewed the portrayal of Miss Foster, and praised Davies' use of sadness in the episode. Christina Orlando, writing for Tor.com in 2022, also praised the chemistry between the Doctor and Donna, referring to the episode as "the perfect episode of Doctor Who".
