= The Lord of the Rings (film series) =

2001–2003 films by Peter Jackson

- Directed by: Peter Jackson
- Screenplay by: Fran Walsh; Philippa Boyens; Peter Jackson; Stephen Sinclair^{TT}
- Based on: The Lord of the Rings by J. R. R. Tolkien
- Produced by: Barrie M. Osborne; Peter Jackson; Fran Walsh; Tim Sanders^{FOTR}
- Starring: Elijah Wood; Ian McKellen; Viggo Mortensen; Sean Astin; Liv Tyler; Cate Blanchett; John Rhys-Davies; Billy Boyd; Dominic Monaghan; Orlando Bloom; Christopher Lee; Hugo Weaving; Sean Bean; Andy Serkis
- Cinematography: Andrew Lesnie
- Edited by: John Gilbert^{FOTR}; Michael Horton^{TT}; Jamie Selkirk^{ROTK}
- Music by: Howard Shore
- Production companies: New Line Cinema; WingNut Films
- Distributed by: New Line Cinema
- Release dates: 2001 (The Fellowship of the Ring); 2002 (The Two Towers); 2003 (The Return of the King)
- Running time: Total (three films): 558 minutes (theatrical); 683 minutes (extended)
- Countries: New Zealand; United States
- Language: English
- Budget: Total (three films): $281 million
- Box office: Total (three films): $2.992 billion

The Lord of the Rings is a trilogy of epic fantasy films directed by Peter Jackson. The films are based on the novel by J. R. R. Tolkien, drawing their titles and most of their plots from its three volumes: The Fellowship of the Ring (2001), The Two Towers (2002), and The Return of the King (2003). Produced and distributed by New Line Cinema with the co-production of Jackson's WingNut Films, the films feature an ensemble cast.

Set in the fictional world of Middle-earth, the films follow the hobbit Frodo Baggins as he and the Company of the Ring set out to destroy the One Ring, an artifact of great magical power, and defeat its maker, the Dark Lord Sauron. The Company eventually separates, and Frodo continues the quest with his loyal valet Sam and the treacherous Gollum. Meanwhile, Aragorn, heir in exile to the throne of Gondor, along with the elf Legolas, the dwarf Gimli, other hobbits Merry and Pippin, and the wizard Gandalf, unite to rally the Free Peoples of Middle-earth against the forces of Sauron.

The three films were shot simultaneously in Jackson's native New Zealand from 11 October 1999 until 22 December 2000, with pick-up shots from 2001 to 2003. It was one of the biggest and most ambitious film projects ever undertaken, with a budget of $281 million (equivalent to $543 million in 2025). The first film in the series premiered at the Odeon Leicester Square in London on 10 December 2001; the second film premiered at the Ziegfeld Theatre in New York City on 5 December 2002; the third film premiered at the Embassy Theatre in Wellington on 1 December 2003. An extended edition of each film was released on home video a year after its release in cinemas.

The Lord of the Rings is widely regarded as one of the greatest and most influential film series ever made. It was a major financial success and is among the highest-grossing film series of all time, having grossed over $2.9 billion worldwide. Its faithfulness to the source material has been a subject of discussion. The series received numerous accolades, winning 17 Academy Awards out of 30 total nominations, including Best Picture for The Return of the King. In 2021, the Library of Congress selected The Fellowship of the Ring for preservation in the United States National Film Registry for being "culturally, historically, or aesthetically significant".

== Films ==
=== The Fellowship of the Ring ===
In the Second Age, Sauron secretly forges the One Ring to dominate the other Rings of Power. As Men and Elves battle Sauron, the prince Isildur cuts the Ring from Sauron's finger, breaking his power and ending the Second Age. Later, when Isildur is killed by Orcs, the Ring is lost for 2,500 years. In the Third Age, Gollum finds and keeps it until the hobbit Bilbo Baggins steals it.

Sixty years later, Bilbo passes on the Ring to Frodo. The Wizard Gandalf warns Frodo to take it to safety. Frodo sets out with Sam, joining Merry and Pippin along the way. They evade pursuit by Sauron's nine Nazgûl servants, but Gandalf misses their rendezvous, having been captured by the evil Wizard Saruman. As the Ranger Strider guides them to Rivendell, the Nazgûl ambush them. Frodo receives a cursed wound from their leader, but is rescued by the elf Arwen. Gandalf escapes from Saruman's tower. Arwen's father Elrond holds a council, which decides the Ring must be destroyed in the fires of Mount Doom. Frodo volunteers to take the Ring, accompanied by eight others. Bilbo gives Frodo his sword Sting, and a mithril mail-shirt.

The company travels through the Mines of Moria. They are stalked by Gollum, who wants to reclaim the Ring, and attacked by Orcs, a troll, and a Balrog. Gandalf confronts the Balrog and is pulled into darkness as the others escape. The Fellowship reaches Lothlórien, where the Elf-queen Galadriel tells Frodo that he alone can complete the quest. Farther downriver, Boromir attempts to take the Ring and is killed by Orcs, who capture Merry and Pippin. Aragorn, Legolas, and Gimli go to rescue Merry and Pippin while Frodo and Sam travel towards Mordor.

=== The Two Towers ===
Lost in the hills near Mordor, Frodo and Sam confront their stalker Gollum and force him to guide them.

Aragorn, Legolas, and Gimli enter the kingdom of Rohan, where they find that Merry and Pippin escaped into Fangorn Forest during a battle between their captors and the prince Éomer's horsemen. In Fangorn, they meet a resurrected Gandalf, who leads them to the capital of Edoras and frees the king, Théoden, from Saruman's magic.

Under threat by Saruman's army, Théoden leads his people to the fortress of Helm's Deep. In Fangorn, Merry and Pippin meet the Ent Treebeard. They show him Saruman's destruction of the forest, which convinces the enraged Ents to storm the wizard's base at Isengard and confine him in the tower.

Meanwhile at Helm's Deep, Aragorn's group helps the people of Rohan fight off a night attack. At dawn, Gandalf and Éomer arrive with reinforcements and destroy the Orc army, with the aid of the awoken trees of Fangorn Forest.

Gollum shows Frodo and Sam the well-defended Black Gate, but recommends another route. The trio are captured by Faramir's Rangers. Learning of the Ring, Faramir initially plans to take them to Gondor and bring it to his father, Denethor, but instead lets them go. Gollum decides to reclaim the Ring by leading Frodo and Sam to the giant spider Shelob so that she will eat them.

=== The Return of the King ===
Gandalf, Théoden and the others reunite with Merry and Pippin at Isengard, where Gandalf retrieves Saruman's palantír. Back at Edoras for a victory celebration, Pippin looks into the palantír, seeing Sauron and a burning tree. Gandalf deduces that the enemy plans to attack Gondor; he rides there with Pippin to warn its leader, Denethor. Pippin triggers the lighting of warning beacons to call Rohan for help.

Elrond gives Aragorn Andúril, reforged from the shards of Elendil's sword Narsil, and urges him to claim Elendil's throne in Gondor. Aragorn travels the Paths of the Dead, and pledges to release the ghosts there from their curse should they come to Gondor's aid.

Gollum convinces Frodo to send Sam away and leads him into Shelob's lair. Shelob paralyses and binds Frodo, but Sam returns and drives her off. Believing Frodo dead, Sam takes the Ring to complete the quest, but realizes his mistake when Orcs take Frodo captive. He rescues Frodo, and the two continue towards Mount Doom.

Denethor sends Faramir on a suicide charge, from which he returns gravely wounded. Denethor falls into madness, and as Orcs attack the city he attempts to burn himself and Faramir on a pyre, but Pippin and Gandalf rescue Faramir. Théoden leads his army to relieve Minas Tirith. He is mortally wounded by the Nazgûl leader, but his niece Éowyn and Merry kill the Nazgûl. Aragorn leads the Army of the Dead to defeat Sauron's forces, then releases them from their curse.

Aragorn marches on Mordor to distract Sauron from Frodo and Sam's quest, drawing the enemy to confront him at the Black Gate. At Mount Doom, Gollum and Frodo fight for the Ring; Gollum momentarily wins by biting off Frodo's finger, but falls into the lava, destroying the Ring, Sauron, and Sauron's armies. Frodo and Sam are rescued by Eagles.

The Fellowship reunites in Gondor. Aragorn is crowned King and marries Arwen. The hobbits return home and Sam marries Rosie Cotton. Four years later, Frodo, still traumatised, leaves for the Undying Lands with Bilbo, Gandalf, and the remaining Elves. He gives Sam the Red Book of Westmarch, detailing their adventures.

== Cast and crew ==
=== Casting ===
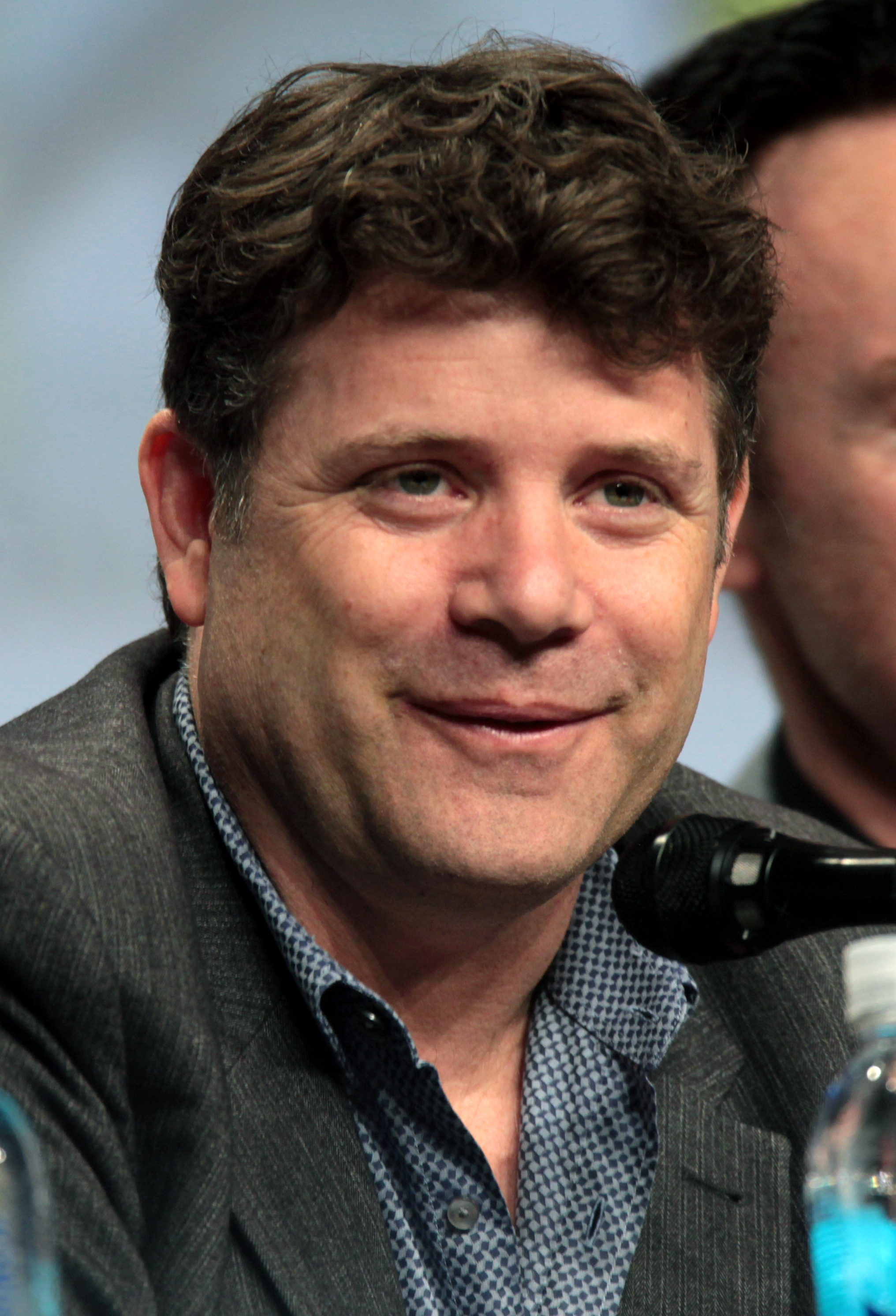
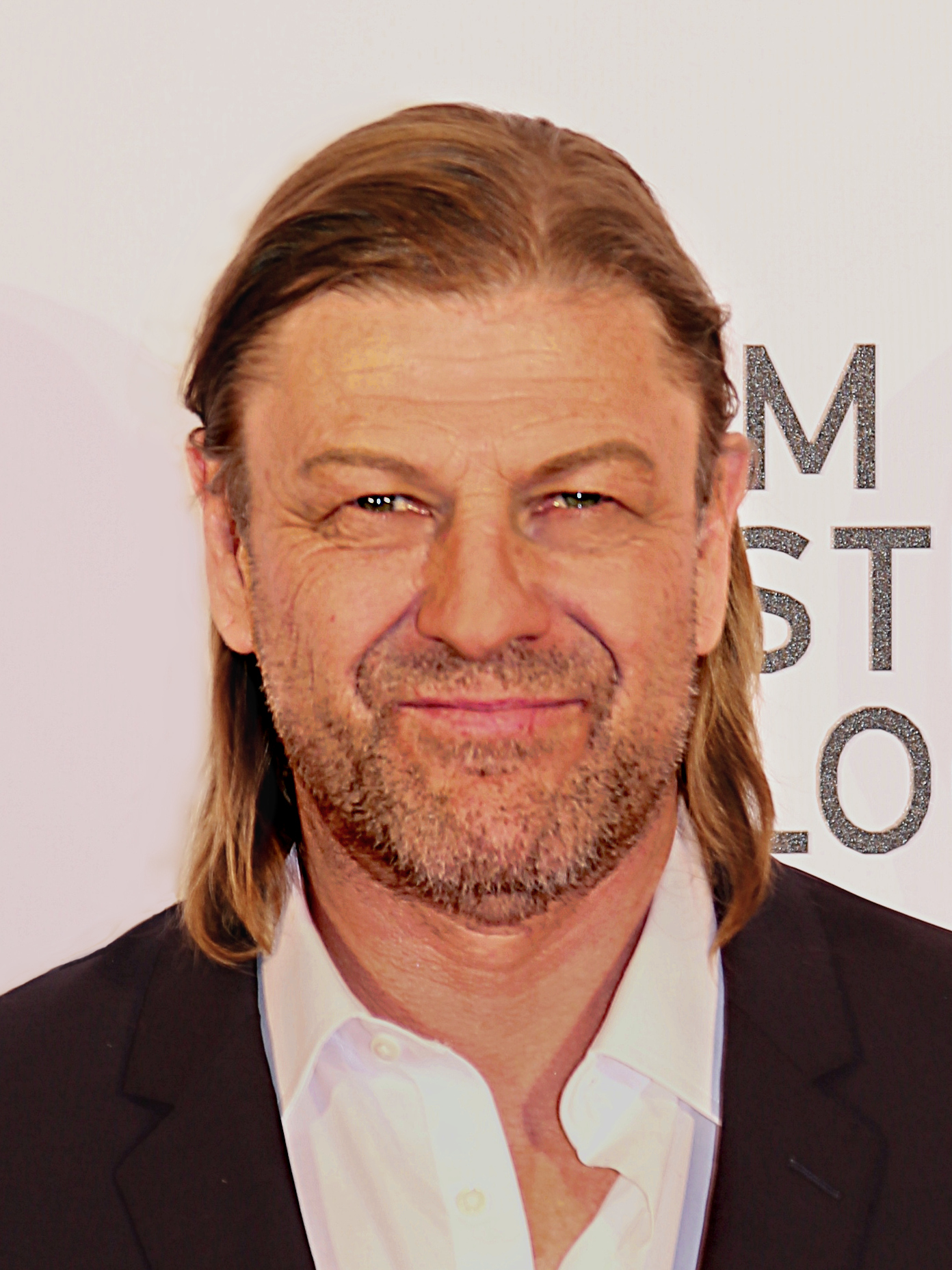
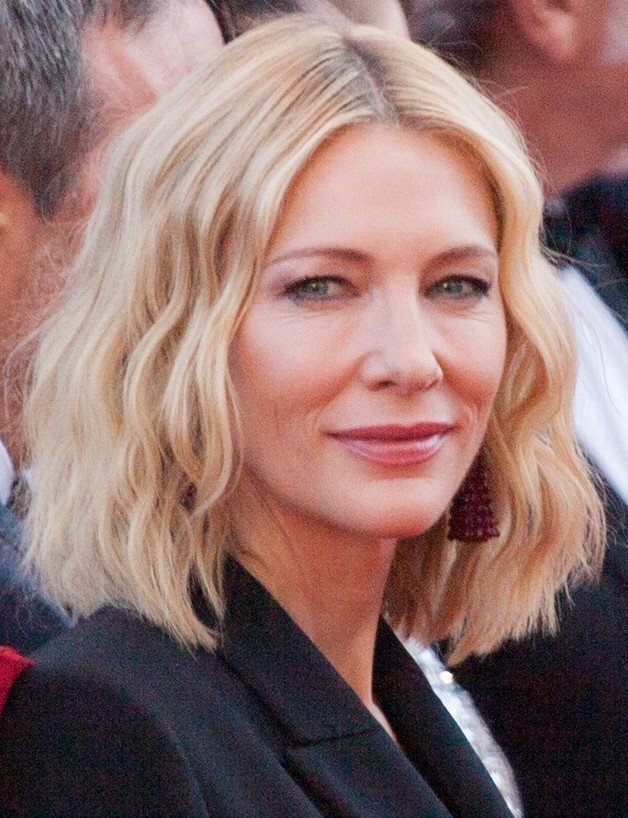
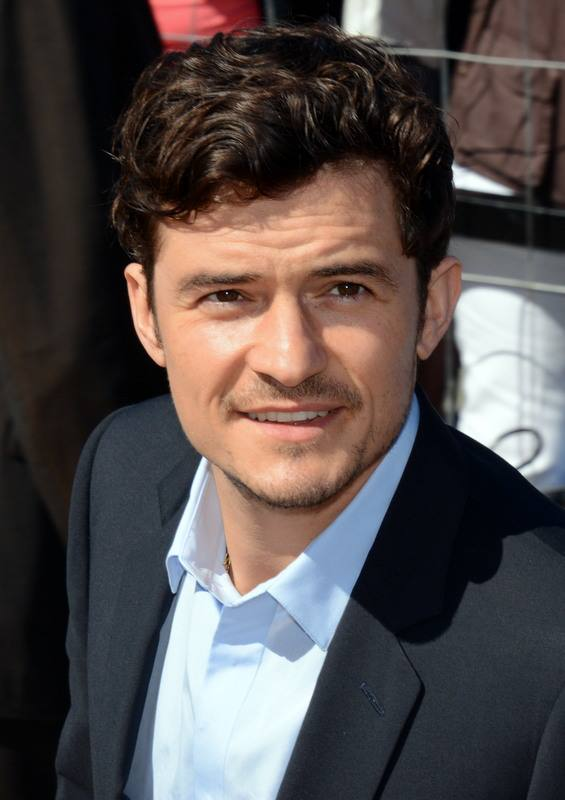
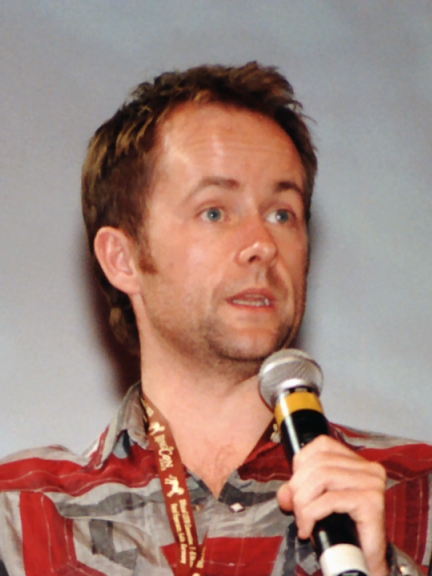
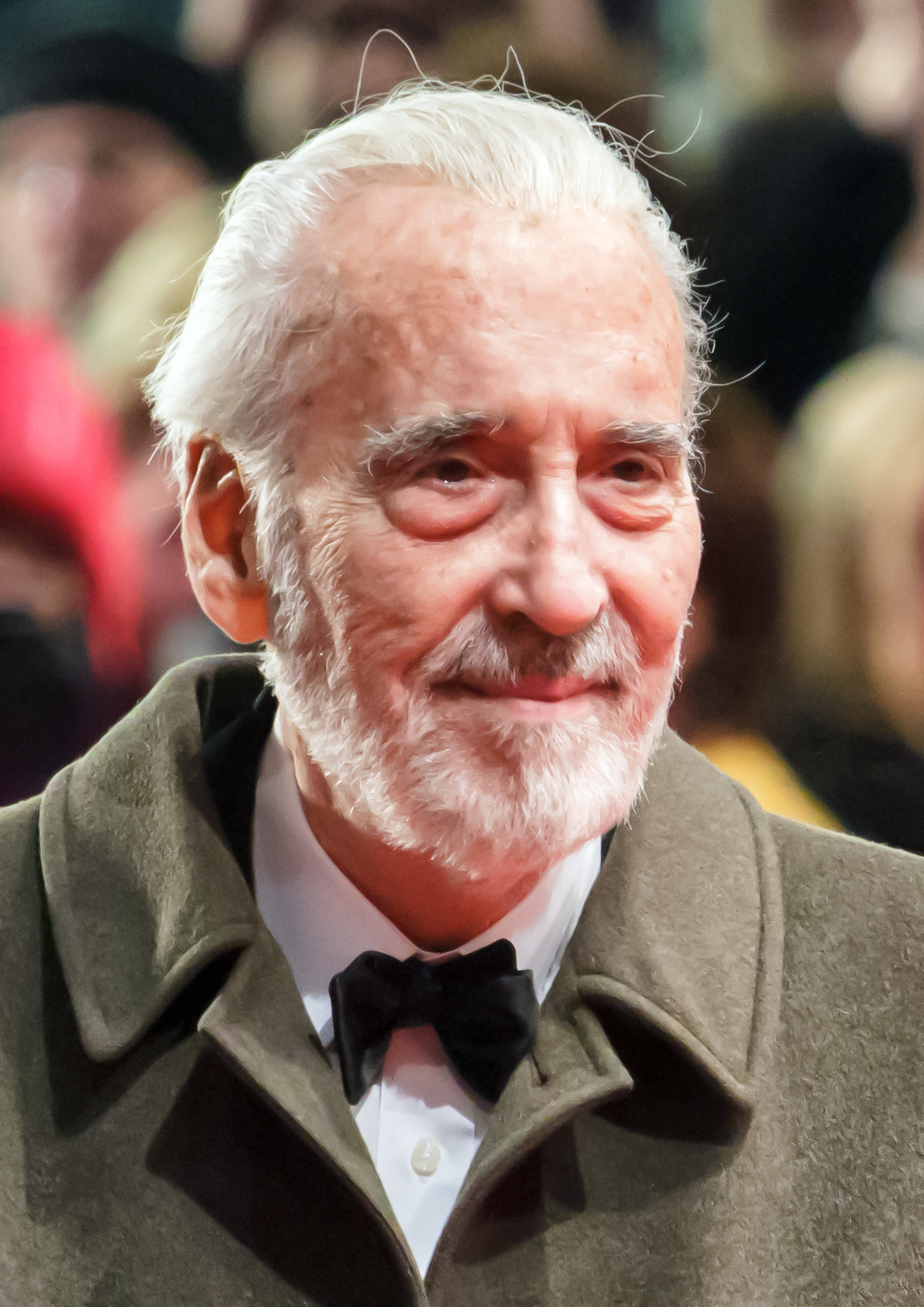
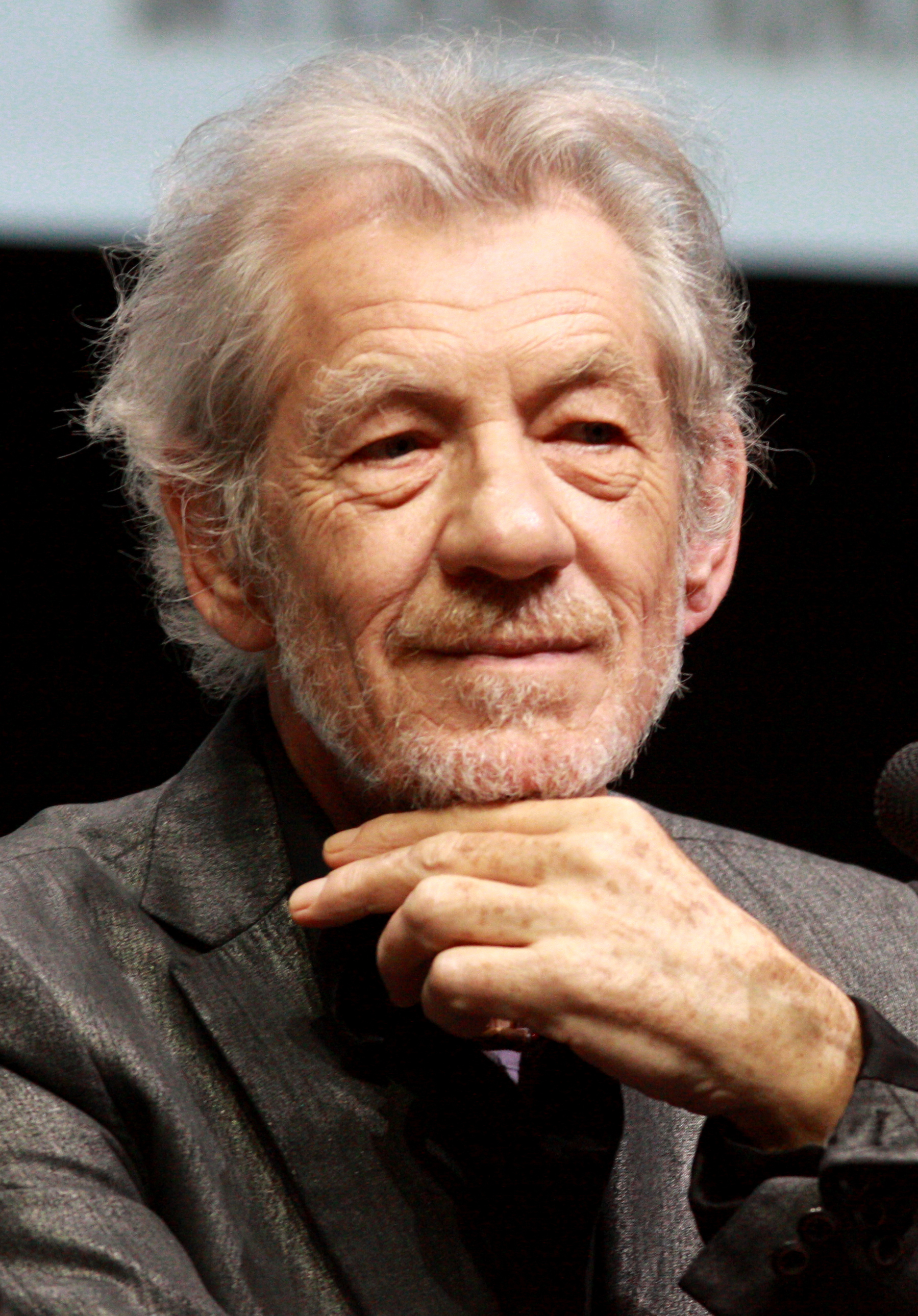
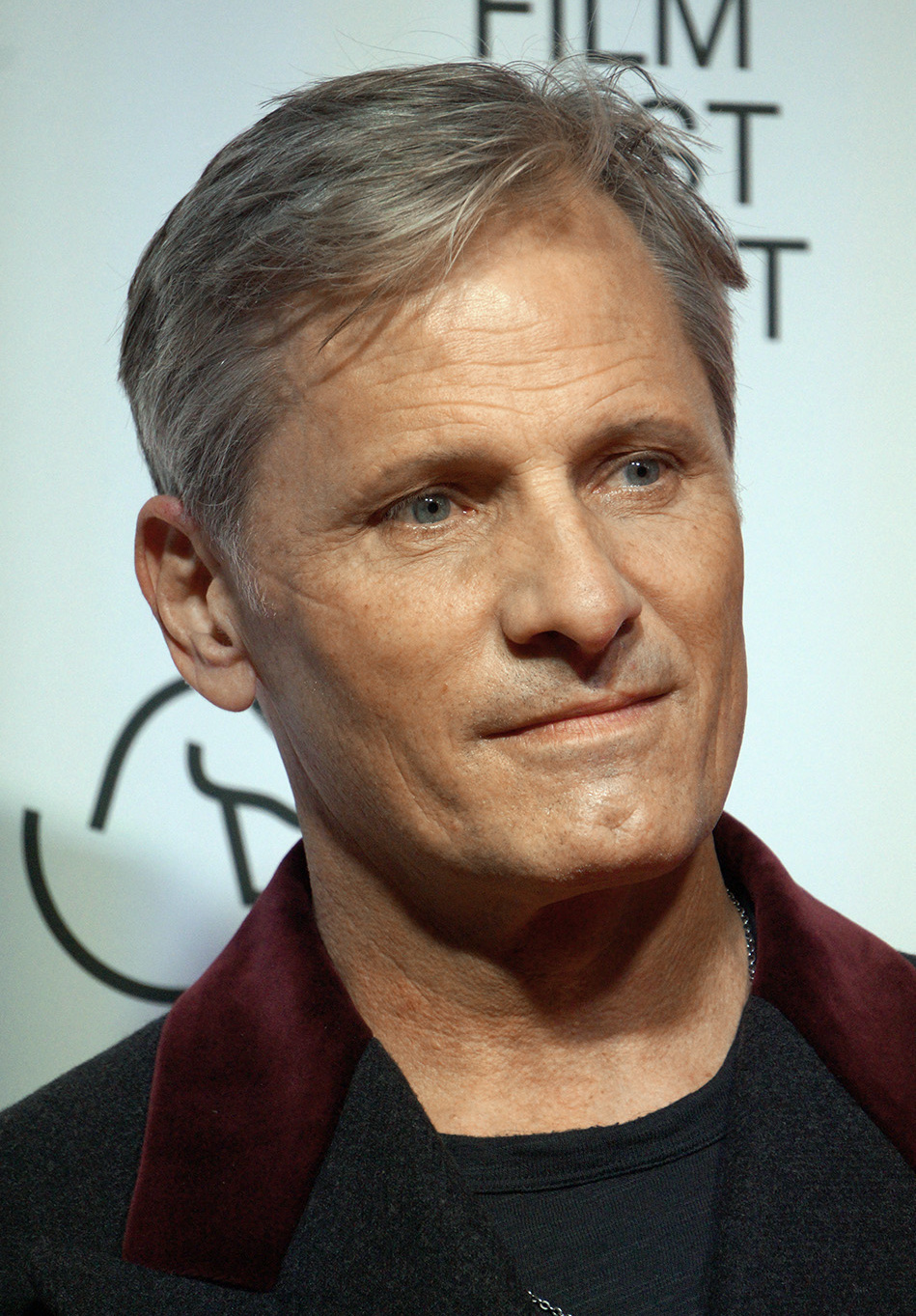
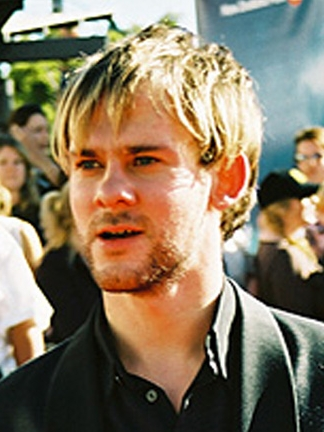
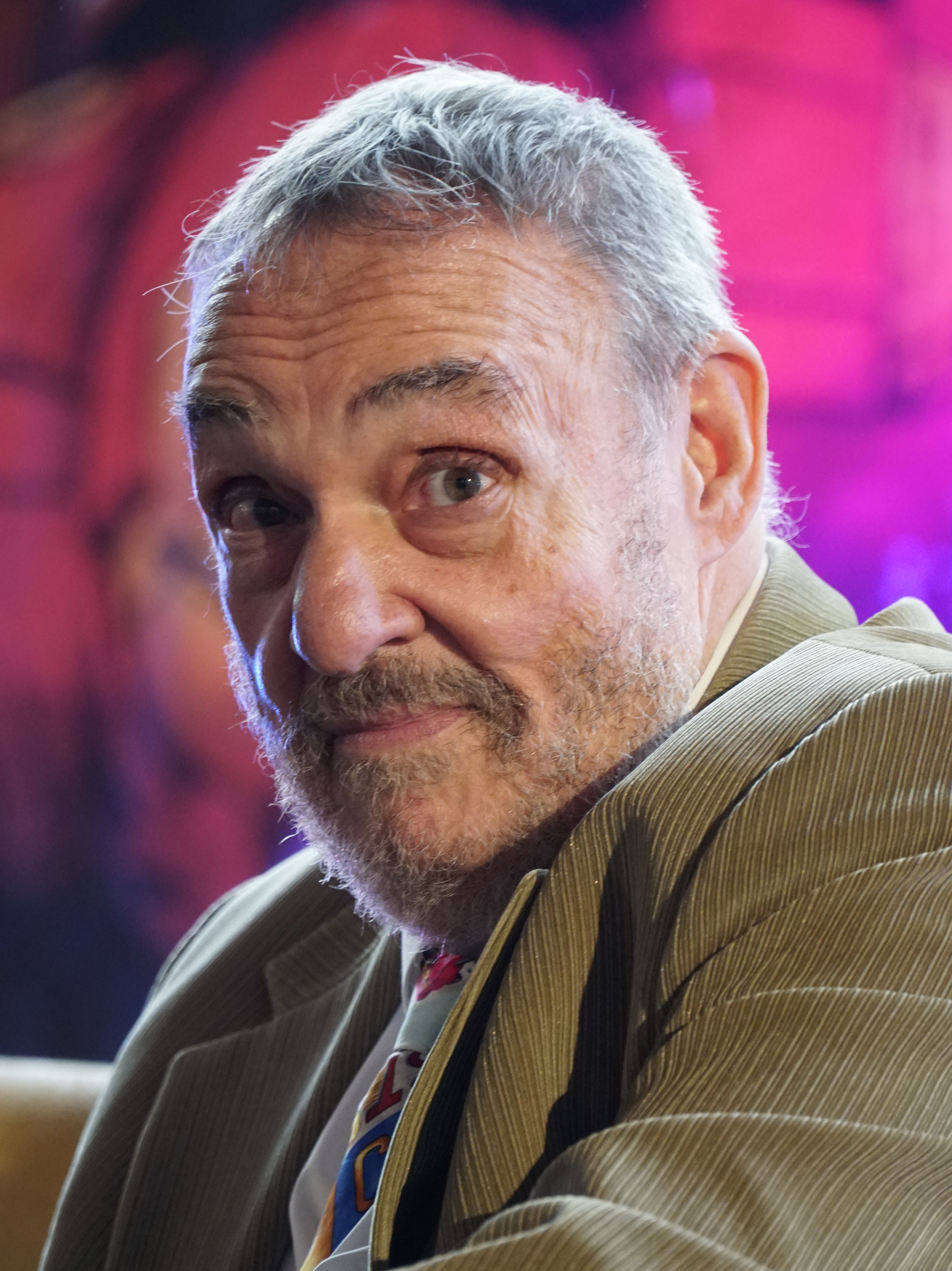
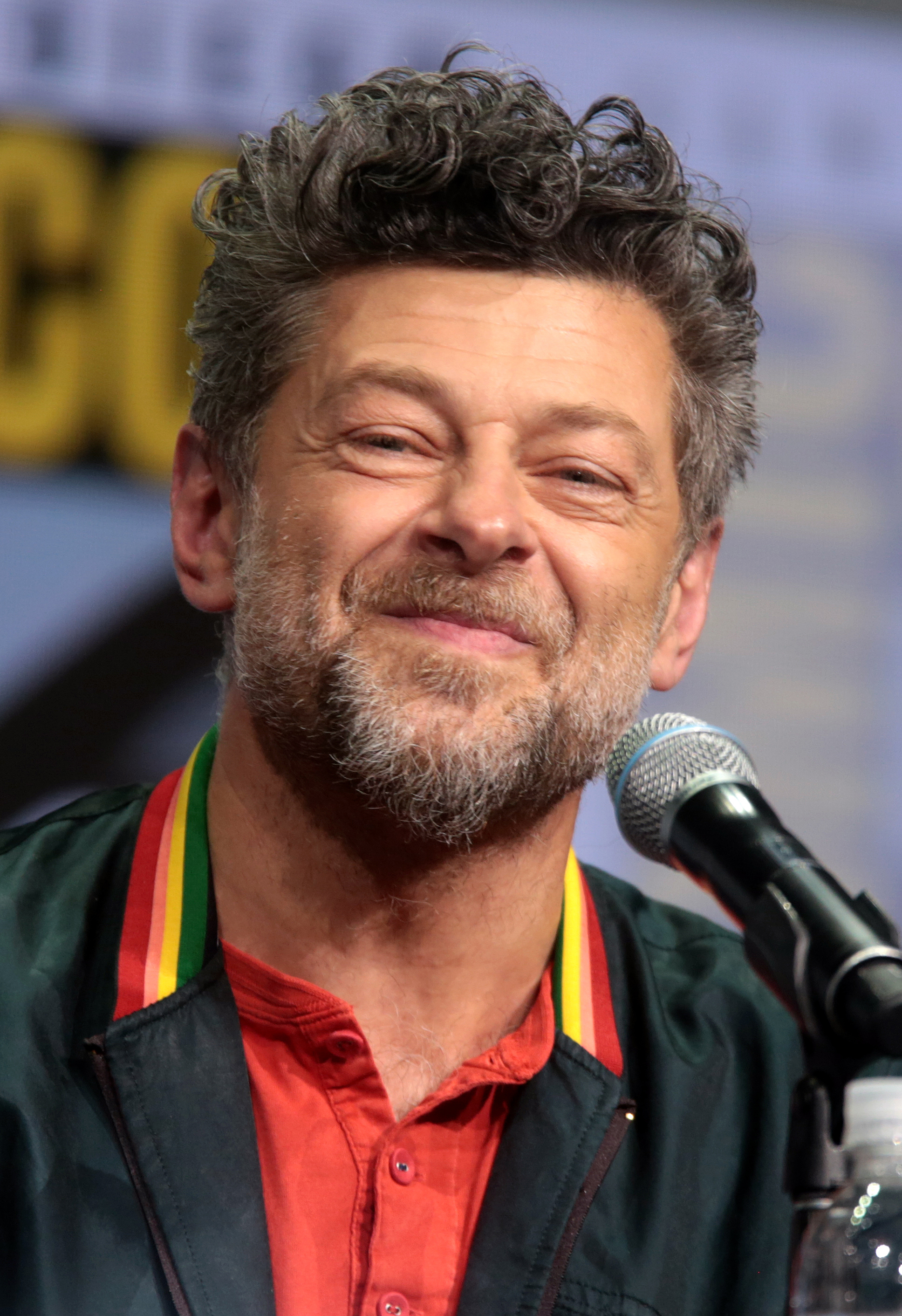
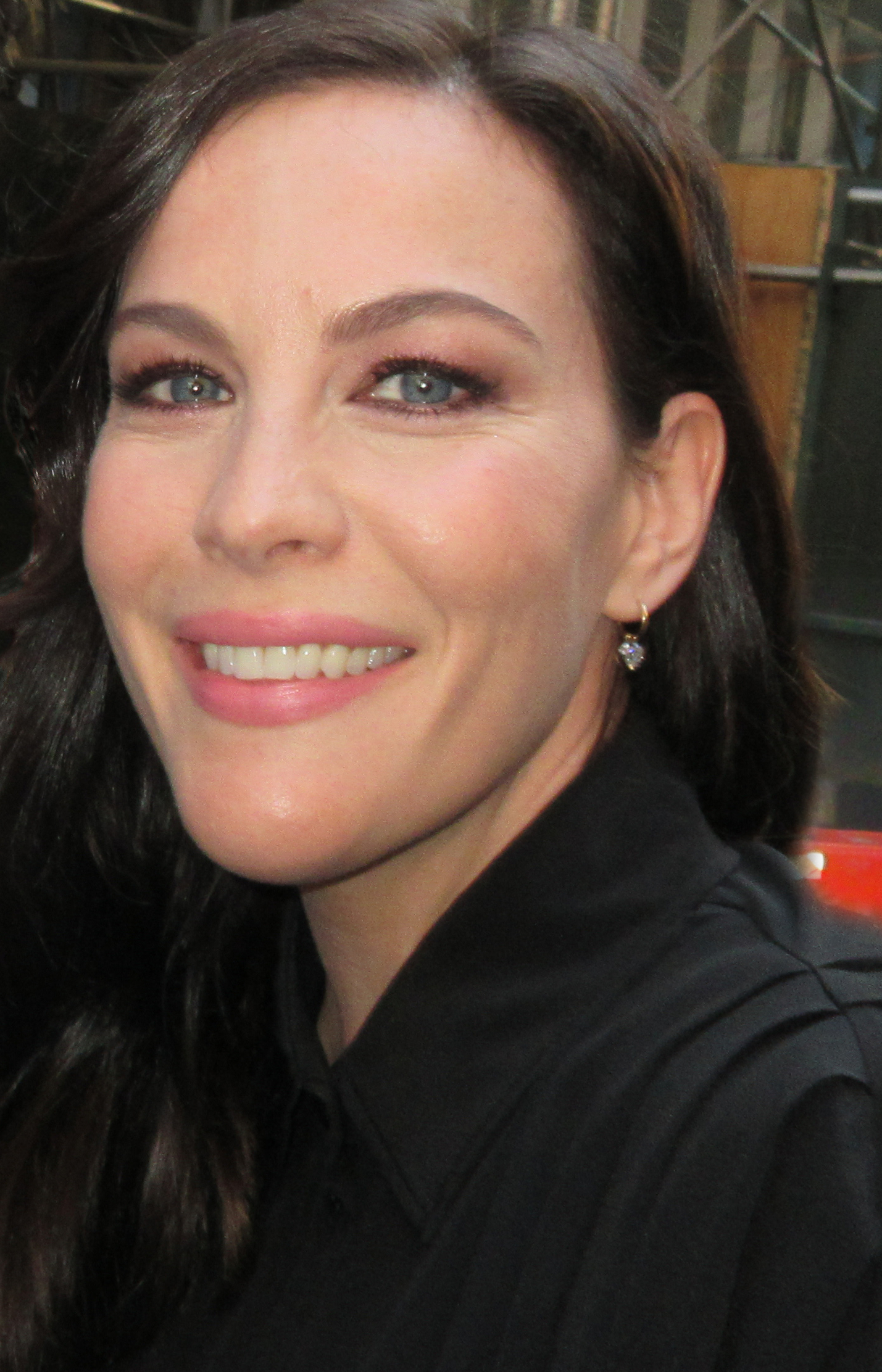
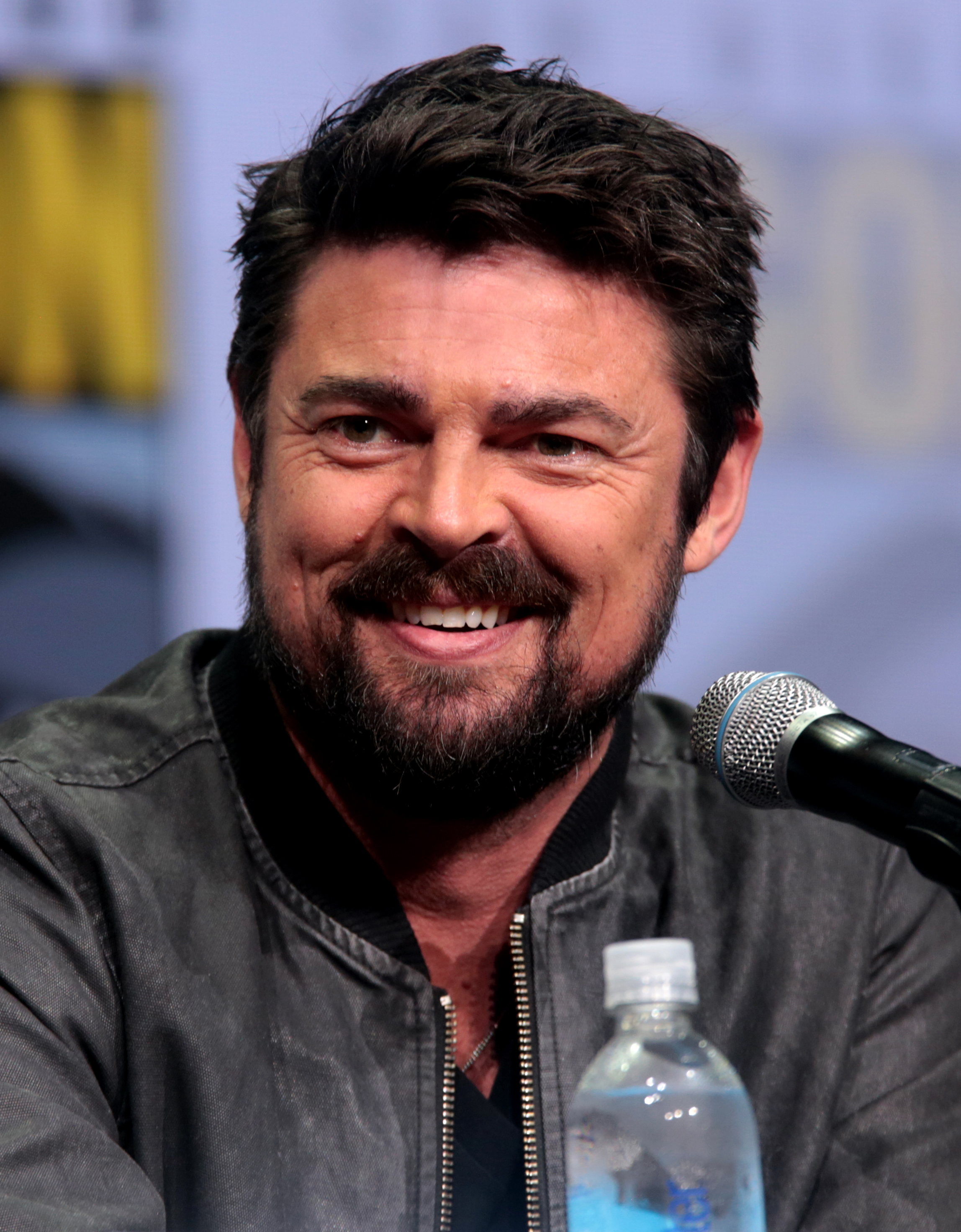
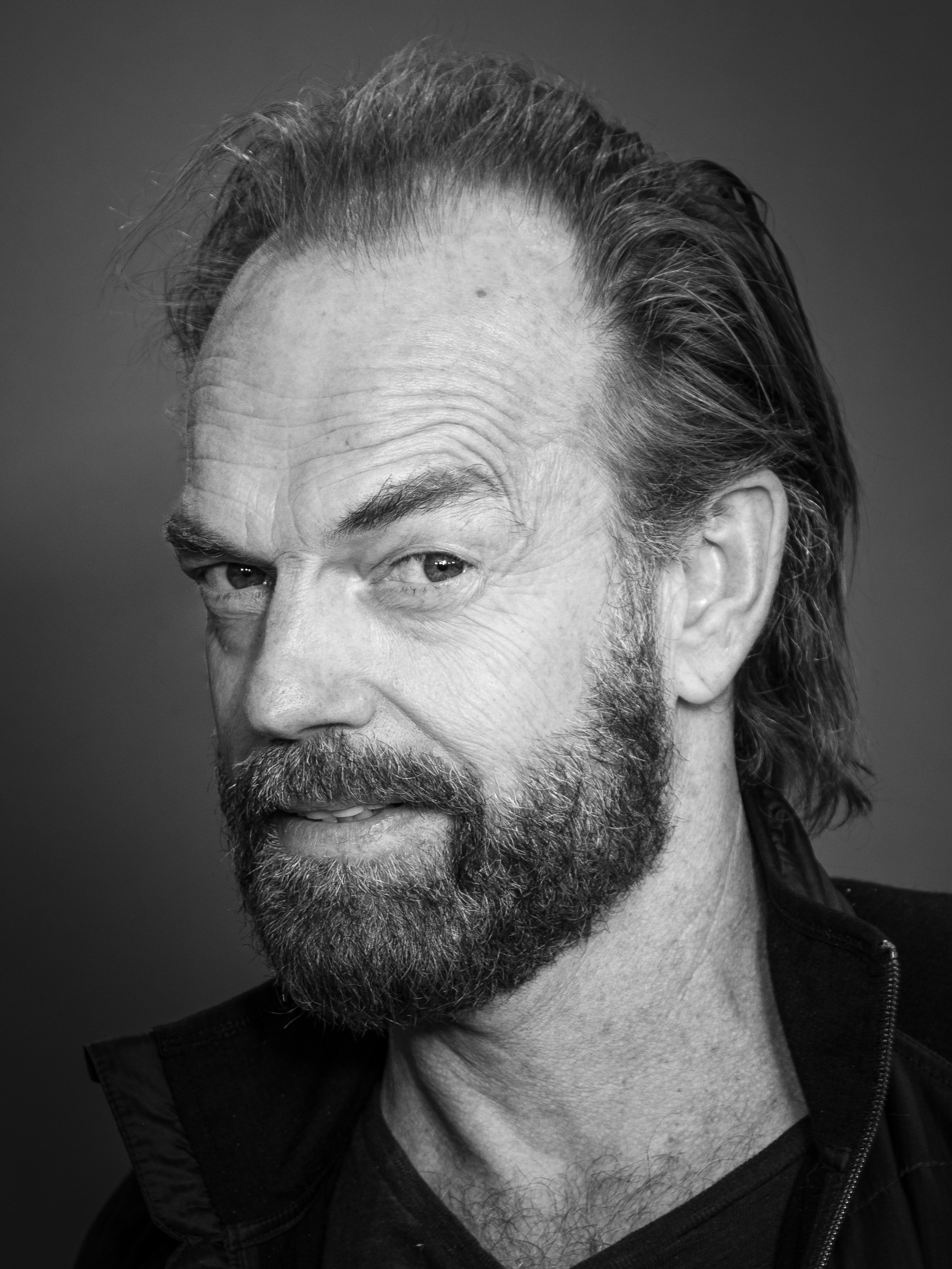
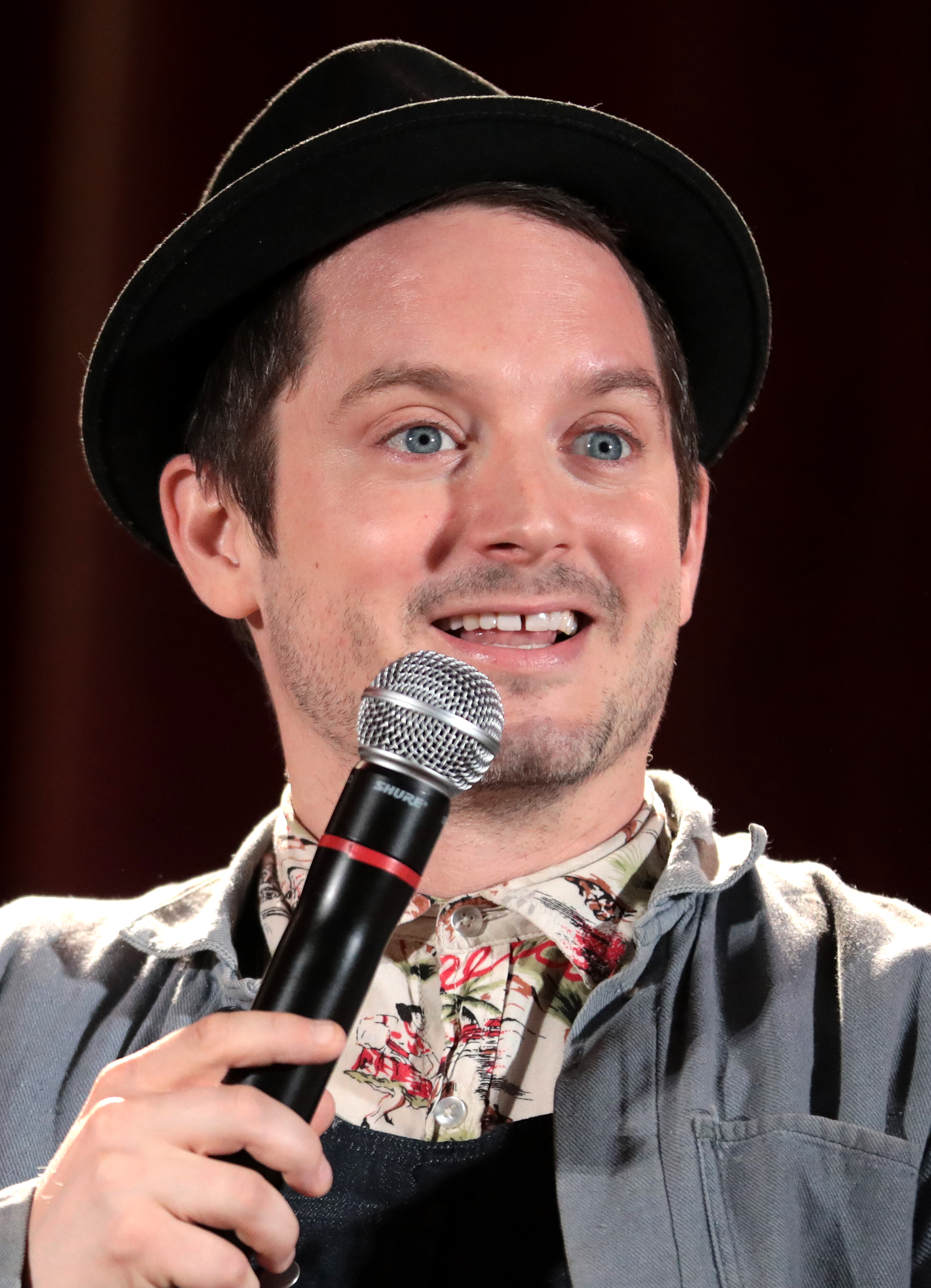
The trilogy features an ensemble cast including (alphabetically from left to right): Sean Astin, Sean Bean, Cate Blanchett, Orlando Bloom, Billy Boyd, Christopher Lee, Ian McKellen, Viggo Mortensen, Dominic Monaghan, John Rhys-Davies, Andy Serkis, Liv Tyler, Karl Urban, Hugo Weaving, and Elijah Wood.

Jackson began abstract discussions on casting during the development of the scripts with Miramax. Jackson, Walsh, and Boyens compiled a casting wishlist, which included Cate Blanchett for Galadriel and Ian Holm for Bilbo. Wondering whether Patrick Stewart would be right for the part of Gandalf, Philippa Boyens drew a tape of him performing opposite Ian McKellen, only to suggest the latter to Jackson. McKellen became Jackson's first choice for Gandalf. Christopher Lee sent Jackson a photograph of himself in a wizard's costume, wanting to play Gandalf.

Miramax wanted a recognisable name for Gandalf and suggested Max von Sydow or Paul Scofield and, wanting an American star, mentioned Morgan Freeman. When New Line took over, they suggested Christopher Plummer or Sean Connery for the part (both declined). When von Sydow inquired for the part later, his agent told him they were looking for an English actor.

While casting, Jackson looked for backup options for the various parts, including Lucy Lawless and Nicole Kidman for Galadriel; Anthony Hopkins or Sylvester McCoy (eventually cast as Radagast in The Hobbit trilogy) for Bilbo; Paul Scofield, Jeremy Irons, Malcolm McDowell, or Tim Curry for Saruman. For Gandalf, they looked into Tom Baker, Tom Wilkinson, Sam Neill, Bernard Hill (who was instead cast as Théoden), and Peter O'Toole.

Miramax and Jackson discussed Daniel Day-Lewis for Aragorn, starting "fanciful internet speculation" that Day-Lewis was approached for the part numerous times, although Jackson eventually inquired about him. Jackson cast Stuart Townsend, whom the studio deemed too young. After shooting began, Jackson agreed and decided to recast the role. They approached Viggo Mortensen, but also spoke to Russell Crowe (who auditioned for Boromir previously), as a backup choice.

Patrick McGoohan, their first choice for Denethor, proved "quite grumpy" when they met, and they instead looked into Donald Sutherland and John Rhys-Davies, and ultimately cast John Noble. Rhys-Davies was recast as Gimli, instead of Billy Connolly (later cast as Dáin in The Hobbit: The Battle of the Five Armies), Robert Trebor, and Timothy Spall. In conversations with Miramax, Liam Neeson's name came up for Boromir, but he declined. New Line suggested Nicolas Cage, but the filmmakers declined.

=== Cast ===
The following cast members voiced or portrayed characters in the extended version of the films.

Character	The Fellowship of the Ring	The Two Towers	The Return of the King
The Fellowship
Frodo Baggins	Elijah Wood	Elijah Wood	Elijah Wood
Aragorn	Viggo Mortensen	Viggo Mortensen	Viggo Mortensen
Boromir	Sean Bean	Sean Bean	Sean Bean
Meriadoc "Merry" Brandybuck	Dominic Monaghan	Dominic Monaghan	Dominic Monaghan
Samwise Gamgee	Sean Astin	Sean Astin	Sean Astin
Gandalf	Ian McKellen	Ian McKellen	Ian McKellen
Gimli	John Rhys-Davies	John Rhys-Davies	John Rhys-Davies
Legolas	Orlando Bloom	Orlando Bloom	Orlando Bloom
Peregrin "Pippin" Took	Billy Boyd	Billy Boyd	Billy Boyd
The Shire and Bree
Bilbo Baggins	Ian Holm		Ian Holm
Mrs. Bracegirdle	Lori Dungey		
Barliman Butterbur	David Weatherley		
Rosie Cotton	Sarah McLeod		Sarah McLeod
Gaffer Gamgee	Norman Forsey		Norman Forsey
Elanor Gamgee			Alexandra Astin
Bree Gate-Keeper	Martyn Sanderson		
Farmer Maggot	Cameron Rhodes		
Old Noakes	Bill Johnson		
Everard Proudfoot	Noel Appleby		Noel Appleby
Mrs. Proudfoot	Megan Edwards		
Otho Sackville	Peter Corrigan		
Lobelia Sackville-Baggins	Elizabeth Moody		
Ted Sandyman	Brian Sergent		
Gollum / Sméagol	Andy Serkis	Andy Serkis	Andy Serkis
Rivendell and Lothlórien
Arwen	Liv Tyler	Liv Tyler	Liv Tyler
Celeborn	Marton Csokas		Marton Csokas
Elrond	Hugo Weaving	Hugo Weaving	Hugo Weaving
Figwit	Bret McKenzie		Bret McKenzie
Galadriel	Cate Blanchett	Cate Blanchett	Cate Blanchett
Haldir	Craig Parker	Craig Parker	
Rúmil	Jørn Benzon		
Mordor, Isengard, and Minas Morgul
Saruman	Christopher Lee	Christopher Lee	Christopher Lee
Gorbag			Stephen Ure
Gothmog			Lawrence Makoare Craig Parker^{V}
Gríma Wormtongue		Brad Dourif	Brad Dourif
Grishnákh		Stephen Ure	
Lurtz	Lawrence Makoare		
Mauhúr		Robbie Magasiva Andy Serkis^{V}	
Mouth of Sauron			Bruce Spence
The One Ring	Alan Howard^{V}		Alan Howard^{V}
Sauron	Sala Baker Alan Howard^{V}		Sala Baker Alan Howard^{V}
Shagrat			Peter Tait
Sharku		Jed Brophy	
Snaga		Jed Brophy Andy Serkis^{V}	
Uglúk		Nathaniel Lees	
Witch-king of Angmar	Brent McIntyre Andy Serkis^{V}		Lawrence Makoare
Rohan and Gondor
Damrod			Alistair Browning
Denethor		John Noble	John Noble
Éomer		Karl Urban	Karl Urban
Éothain		Sam Comery	
Éowyn		Miranda Otto	Miranda Otto
Faramir		David Wenham	David Wenham
Freda		Olivia Tennet	
Gamling		Bruce Hopkins	Bruce Hopkins
Grimbold			Bruce Phillips
Háma		John Leigh	
Haleth		Calum Gittins	
Irolas			Ian Hughes
King of the Dead			Paul Norell
Madril		John Bach	John Bach
Morwen		Robyn Malcolm	
Théoden		Bernard Hill	Bernard Hill
Théodred		Paris Howe Strewe	
Treebeard		John Rhys-Davies^{V}	John Rhys-Davies^{V}
Historical figures
Déagol	Thomas Robins (hand only)		Thomas Robins
Elendil	Peter McKenzie		
Gil-galad	Mark Ferguson		
Isildur	Harry Sinclair		Harry Sinclair

- ^{V} indicates Voice actor.

=== Crew ===
Crew
Crew	The Fellowship of the Ring	The Two Towers	The Return of the King
Director	Peter Jackson	Peter Jackson	Peter Jackson
Producers	Barrie M. Osborne, Peter Jackson, Fran Walsh, and Tim Sanders^{FOTR}		
Screenwriters	Fran Walsh, Philippa Boyens, Peter Jackson, and Stephen Sinclair^{TT}		
Composer	Howard Shore	Howard Shore	Howard Shore
Cinematographer	Andrew Lesnie	Andrew Lesnie	Andrew Lesnie
Editors	John Gilbert^{FOTR}	Michael Horton^{TT}	Jamie Selkirk^{ROTK}
Production designers	Dan Hennah and Grant Major	Dan Hennah and Grant Major	Dan Hennah and Grant Major
Conceptual designers	Alan Lee and John Howe	Alan Lee and John Howe	Alan Lee and John Howe
Costume designers	Ngila Dickson and Richard Taylor	Ngila Dickson and Richard Taylor	Ngila Dickson and Richard Taylor
Visual effects supervisor	Jim Rygiel	Jim Rygiel	Jim Rygiel
Production companies	New Line Cinema and WingNut Films	New Line Cinema and WingNut Films	New Line Cinema and WingNut Films
Distributing company	New Line Cinema	New Line Cinema	New Line Cinema

- ^{FOTR} indicates he only worked on The Fellowship of the Ring.
- ^{TT} indicates he only worked on The Two Towers.
- ^{ROTK} indicates he is only credited as editor on The Return of the King.

== Development ==
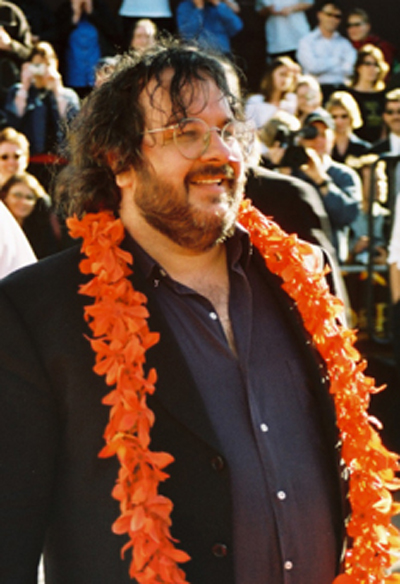
Peter Jackson at the premiere of The Lord of the Rings: The Return of the King on 1 December 2003 at the Embassy Theatre in Wellington.

=== Previous attempts ===
Previous attempts to film J. R. R. Tolkien's works were made by William Snyder, Peter Shaffer and John Boorman. These attempts resulted in a couple of unproduced scripts, concept art and an animated short. Other filmmakers and producers to have an interest in adapting Tolkien are said to include Walt Disney, Al Brodax, Forrest Ackerman, Denis O'Dell (who considered Richard Lester to direct, but instead approached David Lean, Stanley Kubrick, and Michelangelo Antonioni) and George Lucas. The rights to adapt Tolkien's works passed through the hands of several studios, having been briefly leased to Rembrandt Films before being sold perpetually to United Artists (UA). In 1976, UA passed the rights to The Lord of the Rings (and the production rights for The Hobbit) to Fantasy Films.

In 1977, an animated adaptation of The Hobbit was produced as a television special by Rankin and Bass and in 1978 Ralph Bakshi made an animated feature of the first half of The Lord of the Rings. While profitable, the film did not make enough money to automatically warrant the sequel which would close the story and an argument with producer Saul Zaentz led Bakshi to abandon the project. Rankin/Bass then followed in 1980 with an animated television adaptation of The Return of the King. Several other Tolkienesque fantasy films were produced at the time, including Jim Henson and Frank Oz's The Dark Crystal and Lucas's Willow.

At the time Bakshi's film was released, a teenage Peter Jackson had not read the book, but "heard the name", and went to see the film: "I liked the early part—it had some quaint sequences in Hobbiton, a creepy encounter with the Black Rider on the road, and a few quite good battle scenes—but then, about half way through, the storytelling became very disjointed and disorientating and I really didn't understand what was going on. However, what it did do was to make me want to read the book—if only to find out what happened!" Jackson bought a tie-in paperback edition. He later read The Hobbit and The Silmarillion and listened to the 1981 BBC radio adaptation. Assuming someone would one day adapt it to a live-action film, Jackson read up on some previous attempts to bring the piece to the screen. He had not watched the Rankin and Bass television specials.

=== Pitch to Miramax ===
In 1995, while completing post-production on The Frighteners, Jackson and Fran Walsh discussed making an original fantasy film, but could not think of a scenario that was not Tolkien-esque, and eventually decided to look up the film rights. They went to Harvey Weinstein from Miramax Films, who got the rights from Saul Zaentz. Jackson knew it would take multiple films to do Tolkien justice, but initially pitched a single trilogy: one film based on The Hobbit and, if that would prove successful, two Lord of the Rings films shot back-to-back. Jackson began rereading The Hobbit, looking at illustrations and commissioning concept art from the book, but the rights eventually proved unattainable, having been split between Zaentz and Metro-Goldwyn-Mayer's United Artists. Weinstein tried to buy UA's share of the rights, but was unsuccessful.

With The Hobbit postponed for a potential prequel down the road, Jackson proceeded with making two Lord of the Rings films: "We pitched the idea of three films and Miramax didn't really want to take that risk, but we agreed on two." He began writing the scripts with Walsh and Stephen Sinclair, storyboarding with Christian Rivers, and discussing casting ideas with the Weinsteins.

=== Move to New Line Cinema ===
As the scripts were taking shape, it became clear that the budget required would exceed Miramax Films' capabilities. The Weinsteins suggested cutting the project to one film. Jackson inquired whether it could be around four hours in duration, but Miramax Films insisted on two hours, suggesting major cuts to the story, which Jackson refused. Harvey Weinstein threatened to replace Jackson with screenwriter Hossein Amini and directors John Madden or Quentin Tarantino. Jackson believed this was an empty threat to get him to concede to making a one-film version himself.

Harvey Weinstein eventually relented and agreed to put the project into turnaround, but his draconian conditions, such as 5% of first dollar gross, were meant to prevent the project from being taken up by another studio. Jackson got an audience with New Line Cinema CEO Robert Shaye, who accepted the project, but requested that it be expanded into a trilogy. New Line Cinema had many promising reasons that the trilogy would be successful, which led them to sign on. Final cut rights were shared contractually between Jackson and Bob Shaye, but there was never any interference in Jackson's cut. Initially, each film had a production budget of $60 million, but New Line Cinema accepted Jackson's request for an increased budget after a 26-minute preview of The Fellowship of the Ring was presented at the 2001 Cannes Film Festival.

== Production ==
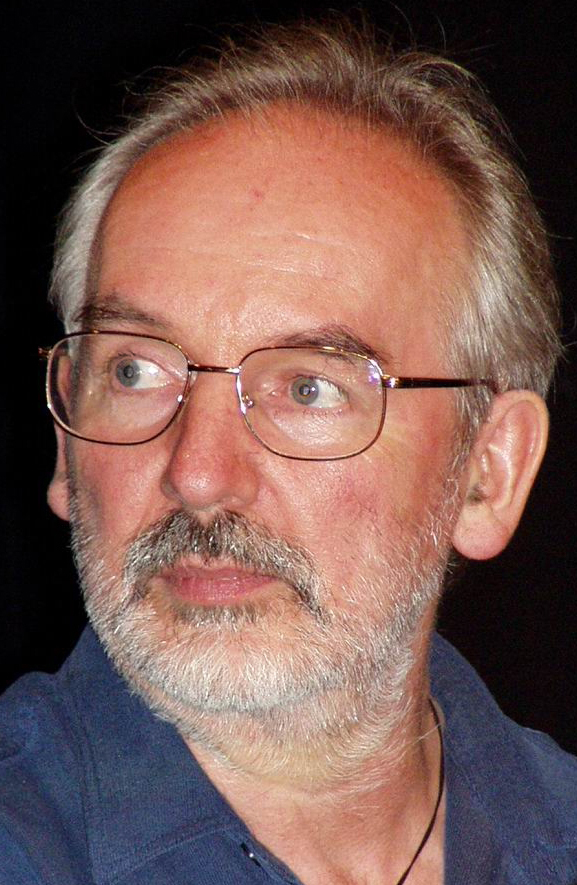
Alan Lee, a Tolkien illustrator who assisted in the visual design, at Worldcon 2005 in Glasgow.

Jackson began storyboarding and screenwriting the series with Christian Rivers, Fran Walsh, and Philippa Boyens in 1997 and assigned his crew to begin designing Middle-earth at the same time. Jackson, Walsh, and Boyens did not write each film to correspond exactly to its respective book, opting instead to write a three-part adaptation with some sequences missing, some sequences created from scratch, and some sequences moved from one area to another, regardless of its placement in the books. To allow the story to be clearer for viewers, Jackson took a more chronological approach to the story than Tolkien's complex interlacing of storylines. During shooting, the screenplays continued to evolve, in part due to contributions from cast members looking to further explore their characters.

Earlier versions of the script included additional characters like Fatty Bolger, Glorfindel, Elladan, Elrohir, Erkenbrand, Imrahil, and Forlong. At one point, Jackson even considered reintroducing Tom Bombadil in a cameo. Gimli was going to swear throughout the films and Arwen would join the Fellowship in Rohan and share a nude scene with Aragorn in the pools of the Glittering Caves.

Jackson hired long-time collaborator Richard Taylor to lead Weta Workshop on five major design elements: armour, weapons, prosthetic makeup, creatures, and miniatures. At New Line's request, animation supervisor Jim Rygiel replaced Weta Digital's Mark Stetson. In November 1997, famed Tolkien illustrators Alan Lee and John Howe joined the project; but Jackson also relied on the work of Ted Nasmith, who later turned down an offer to join Lee and Howe. Jackson wanted realistic designs in the style of historical epics rather than fantasy films, citing Braveheart as an inspiration:

It might be clearer if I described it as an historical film. Something very different to Dark Crystal or Labyrinth. Imagine something like Braveheart, but with a little of the visual magic of Legend. [...] It should have the historical authority of Braveheart, rather than the meaningless fantasy mumbo-jumbo of Willow.

Production designer Grant Major was charged with converting Lee and Howe's designs into architecture, creating models of the sets, while Dan Hennah worked as art director, scouting locations and organizing the building of sets. Ngila Dickson collaborated with Richard Taylor on producing costumes, while Peter King and Peter Owen designed makeup and hair. Most of these crew members (and others) returned to work on The Hobbit.

Jackson and cinematographer Andrew Lesnie considered shooting in large format like 65 mm film, or to master the films at 4K, but both were cost-prohibitive and could not be done on New Zealand soil. They decided to shoot on fine-grain Super 35 mm film and subject the films to rigorous digital grading.

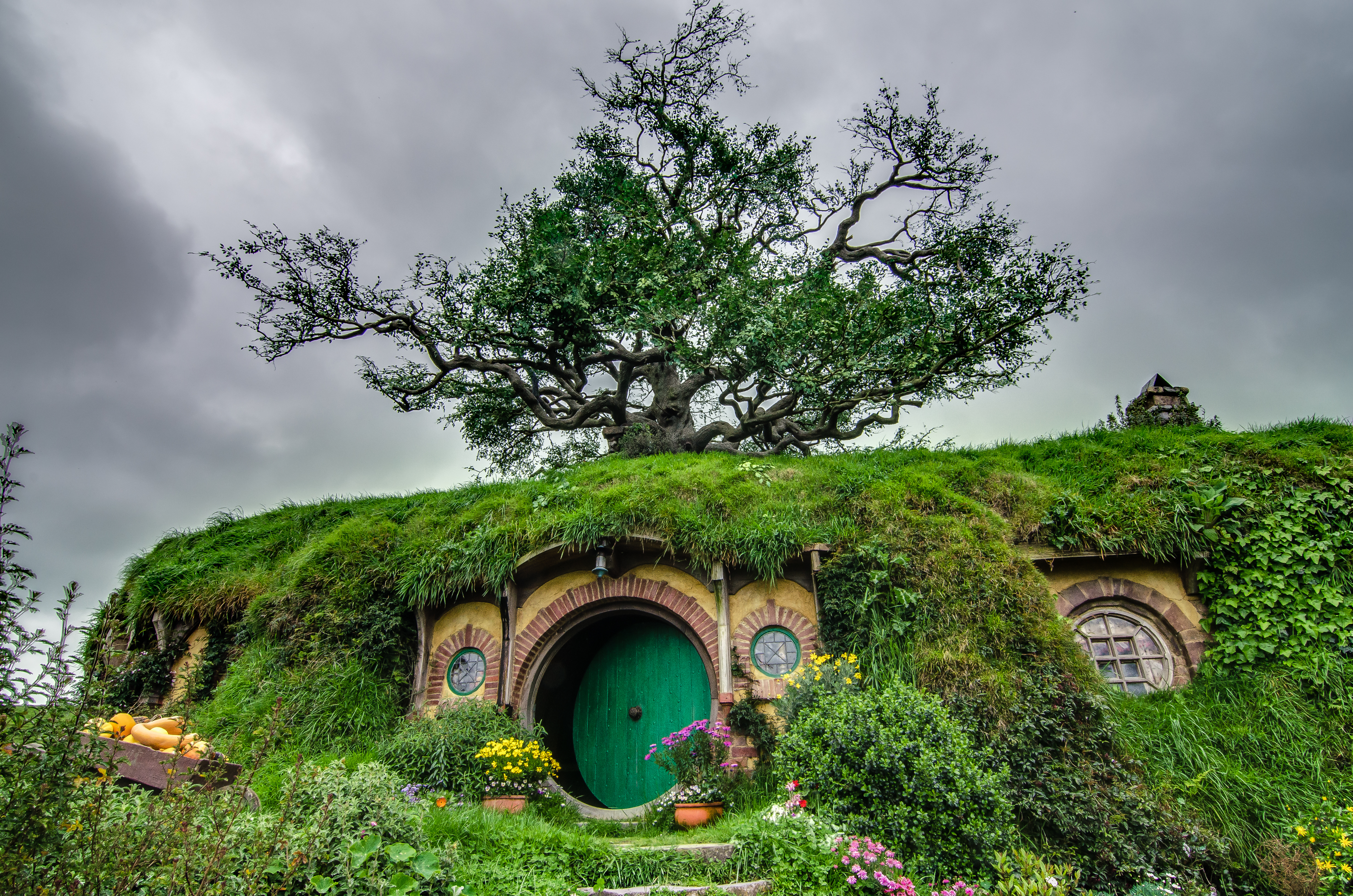
The house of Bilbo and Frodo Baggins in the Shire, as filmed in New Zealand

Principal photography for all three films was conducted concurrently in many locations within New Zealand's conservation areas and national parks. Filming took place between 11 October 1999 and 22 December 2000. Pick-up shoots were conducted annually from 2001 to 2003. The series was shot at many different locations, with seven different units shooting, and soundstages around Wellington and Queenstown. Along with Jackson directing the whole production, other unit directors included John Mahaffie, Geoff Murphy, Barrie M. Osborne, Rick Porras, George Marshall Ruge, and any other assistant director, producer, or writer available. Miniature Photography took place throughout the entire period, amounting to over 1,000 shooting days.

Weta Digital developed new technologies to allow for the groundbreaking digital effects required for the trilogy, including the development of the MASSIVE software to generate intelligent crowds for battle scenes, and advancing the art of motion capture, which was used on bipedal creatures like the Cave Troll or Gollum. With Jackson's future films, motion-capture technology came to be pushed so far that it became referred to as "digital makeup", although it was later clarified that during The Lord of the Rings period, it was still fairly reliant on the CG animators.

Each film had the benefit of a full year of post-production time before its respective December release, often finishing in October–November, with the crew immediately going to work on the next film. Jackson originally wanted to edit all three films with Jamie Selkirk, but this proved too much work. The next idea was to have John Gilbert, Michael Horton, and Selkirk, respectively, editing the three films simultaneously, but after a month that proved too difficult for Jackson, and the films were edited in consecutive years, although Selkirk continued to act as "Supervising Editor" on the first two entries. Daily rushes would often last up to four hours, and by the time The Fellowship of the Ring had been released, assembly cuts of the other two films (4 1/2 hours each) were already prepared. In total, 1,828 km (six million feet) of film was edited down to the 11 hours and 26 minutes (686 minutes) of extended running time.

== Music ==
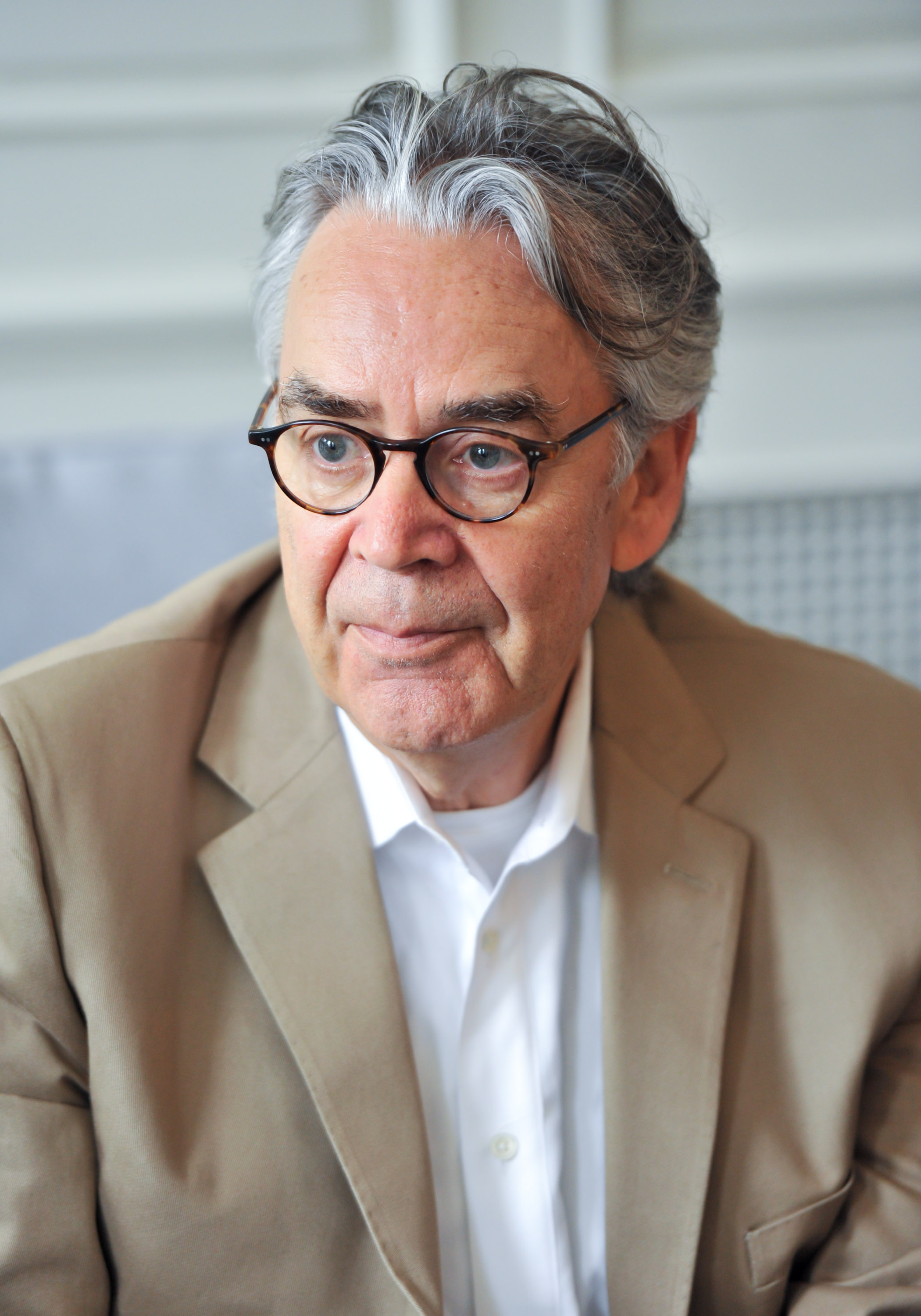
Howard Shore, composer of the music of the films.

Howard Shore composed, orchestrated, conducted and produced the trilogy's music. Shore visited the set in 1999, and composed a version of the Shire theme and Frodo's Theme before Jackson began shooting. In August 2000, he visited the set again and watched the assembly cuts of The Fellowship of the Ring and The Return of the King. In the music, Shore included many (85 to 110) leitmotifs to represent various characters, cultures and places—the largest catalogue of leitmotifs in the history of cinema, surpassing, for comparison, that of the entire Star Wars film series. For example, there are multiple leitmotifs just for the hobbits and the Shire. Although the first film had some of its score recorded in Wellington, virtually all of the trilogy's score was recorded in Watford Town Hall and mixed at Abbey Road Studios. Jackson planned to advise the score for six weeks each year in London, though for The Two Towers he stayed for twelve.

The score is primarily played by the London Philharmonic Orchestra, ranging from 93 to 120 players throughout the recording. London Voices, the London Oratory School Schola boy choir, and many artists such as Ben Del Maestro, Sheila Chandra, Enya, Renée Fleming, James Galway, Annie Lennox, and Emilíana Torrini contributed. Even actors Billy Boyd, Viggo Mortensen, Liv Tyler, Miranda Otto (extended cuts only for the latter two), and Peter Jackson (for a single gong sound in the second film) contributed to the score. Fran Walsh and Philippa Boyens served as librettists, writing lyrics to various music and songs, which David Salo translated into Tolkien's languages. The third film's end song, "Into the West", was a tribute to a young filmmaker Jackson and Walsh befriended named Cameron Duncan, who died of cancer in 2003.

Shore composed a main theme for the Fellowship rather than many different character themes, and its strength and weaknesses in volume are depicted at different points in the series. On top of that, individual themes were composed to represent different cultures. The amount of music Shore had to write every day for the third film increased dramatically to around seven minutes. As of 2015, the music for the series had been voted best movie soundtrack of all time for six years running, ahead of Schindler's List (1993), Gladiator (2000), Star Wars (1977), and Out of Africa (1985), respectively.

=== Soundtracks ===
Title	U.S. release date	Length	Composer	Label
The Fellowship of the Ring: Original Motion Picture Soundtrack	20 November 2001	71:29	Howard Shore	Reprise Records
The Two Towers: Original Motion Picture Soundtrack	10 December 2002	72:46	Howard Shore	Reprise Records
The Return of the King: Original Motion Picture Soundtrack	25 November 2003	72:05	Howard Shore	Reprise Records

== Reception ==
=== Box office ===
The trilogy's online promotional trailer was first released on 27 April 2000 and set a new record for download hits, registering 1.7 million hits in the first 24 hours of its release. The trailer used a selection from the soundtrack for Braveheart and The Shawshank Redemption among other cuts. In 2001, 24 minutes of footage from the series, primarily the Moria sequence, was shown at the 54th Cannes Film Festival, and was very well received. The showing also included an area designed to look like Middle-earth.

The Fellowship of the Ring was released on 19 December 2001. It grossed $47.2 million in its U.S. opening weekend and made over $868 million worldwide. A preview of The Two Towers was inserted just before the end credits near the end of the film's theatrical run. A promotional trailer was later released, containing music re-scored from the film Requiem for a Dream. The Two Towers was released 18 December 2002. It grossed $62 million in its first U.S. weekend and out-grossed its predecessor with over $923 million worldwide. The promotional trailer for The Return of the King was debuted exclusively before the New Line Cinema film Secondhand Lions on 23 September 2003. Released 17 December 2003, its first U.S. weekend gross was $72.6 million, and became the second film, after Titanic (1997), to gross over $1.1 billion worldwide. The films are the highest-grossing in New Zealand cinema history, and the second-highest grossing franchise filmed in New Zealand behind Avatar.

Film	U.S. release date	Box office gross			All-time ranking				Budget	Ref(s)
Film	U.S. release date	U.S. and Canada	Other territories	Worldwide	U.S. and Canada		Worldwide		Budget	Ref(s)
Film	U.S. release date	U.S. and Canada	Other territories	Worldwide	Rank	Peak	Rank	Peak	Budget	Ref(s)
The Fellowship of the Ring	19 December 2001	$325,873,309	$571,667,183	$897,540,492	102	9	89	5	$93 million	
The Two Towers	18 December 2002	$350,104,956	$595,080,961	$945,185,917	84	7	78	4	$94 million	
The Return of the King	17 December 2003	$386,975,644	$762,478,030	$1,149,453,674	62	6	36	2	$94 million	
Total		$1,062,953,909	$1,929,226,174	$2,992,180,083					$281 million	(Note: Sources other than Box Office Mojo that refer to the trilogy's budget being $281 million include: The New York Times, The Independent, The Telegraph, Business Insider, Collider, and IndieWire.)

=== Critical and public response ===
The Lord of the Rings trilogy received widespread acclaim and is ranked among the greatest film trilogies ever made. Kenneth Turan of the Los Angeles Times wrote that "the trilogy will not soon, if ever, find its equal", while Todd McCarthy of Variety described the films as "one of the most ambitious and phenomenally successful dream projects of all time". The Fellowship of the Ring was voted the greatest fantasy movie of all time in a reader's poll conducted by American magazine Wired in 2012, while The Two Towers and The Return of the King placed fourth and third respectively. The Independent ranked The Lord of the Rings trilogy at No. 2 on its list of "10 greatest movie trilogies of all time". The Lord of the Rings trilogy is ranked at No. 2 in /Film's list of "The 15 Greatest Trilogies Of All Time", while Empire ranked it at No. 1 in its list of "The 33 Greatest Movie Trilogies".

The series appears in the Dallas–Fort Worth Film Critics Association: Top 10 Films, Time's All-Time 100 Movies, and James Berardinelli's Top 100. In 2007, USA Today named the series as the most important films of the past 25 years. Entertainment Weekly put it on its end-of-the-decade, "best-of" list, saying: "Bringing a cherished book to the big screen? No sweat. Peter Jackson's trilogy — or, as we like to call it, our preciousssss — exerted its irresistible pull, on advanced Elvish speakers and neophytes alike." Paste named it one of the 50 Best Movies of the Decade (2000–2009), ranking it at No. 4. In another Time magazine list, the series ranks second in "Best Movies of the Decade". In addition, six characters and their respective actors made the list of 'The 100 Greatest Movie Characters', also compiled by Empire, with Viggo Mortensen's portrayal of Aragorn ranking No. 15, Ian McKellen's portrayal of Gandalf ranking No. 30, Ian Holm's portrayal of Bilbo Baggins (shared with Martin Freeman for his portrayal of the same character in The Hobbit films) ranking No. 61, Andy Serkis' portrayal of Gollum ranking No. 66, Sean Astin's portrayal of Samwise Gamgee ranking No. 77, and Orlando Bloom's portrayal of Legolas ranking No. 94.

The New York Times suggested in a 2021 article that regular viewing of the film series had become a particular phenomenon for "millennial women", drawing a comparison to Star Wars.

Film	Rotten Tomatoes	Metacritic	CinemaScore
The Fellowship of the Ring	92% (8.80/10 average rating) (271 reviews)	92/100 (34 reviews)	A−
The Two Towers	95% (8.70/10 average rating) (289 reviews)	87/100 (39 reviews)	A
The Return of the King	94% (9.10/10 average rating) (306 reviews)	94/100 (41 reviews)	A+

=== Industry response ===
The series drew acclaim from within the industry, including from the film directors Steven Spielberg, James Cameron, and George Lucas. John Boorman, who once wrote a script for a Lord of the Rings film, said he was happy his own version was unmade as Jackson's film trilogy was "of such scope and magnitude that it can only be compared to the building of the great Gothic cathedrals." Forrest J. Ackerman, who once presented a film treatment to Tolkien, and appeared on Jackson's Bad Taste said his pitch "could never have been given the grand treatment that Peter Jackson afforded it." Arthur Rankin said Jackson was making "marvellous films".

Some filmmakers, however, were more critical. Heinz Edelmann, who pitched the idea of an animated feature when United Artists considered shooting the films with the Beatles, thought it was "badly directed". Ralph Bakshi, who made an animated film based on the first half of the trilogy, did not watch the films, but was told that Jackson's film was derivative of his. Ahead of the films' release, he said he did not "understand it" but that he did "wish it to be a good movie." Later, he begruged Saul Zaentz for not notifying him of the live-action film, and said that Jackson had his film to study and therefore had "a little easier time than I did." Afterwards, he grumbled that Jackson "didn't understand" Tolkien and created "special effects garbage" to sell toys, as well as being derivative of his own film. Bakshi further blamed Jackson for not acknowledging the influence that the animated film had on him, saying (falsely) that he denied having seen Bakshi's film at all until being forced to mention him, at which point (according to Bakshi) he mentioned Bakshi's influence "only once" as "PR bolony". He did, however, praise Jackson's special effects and, in 2015, even apologised for some of his remarks. Bakshi's animator Mike Ploog praised the live-action film.

=== Accolades ===
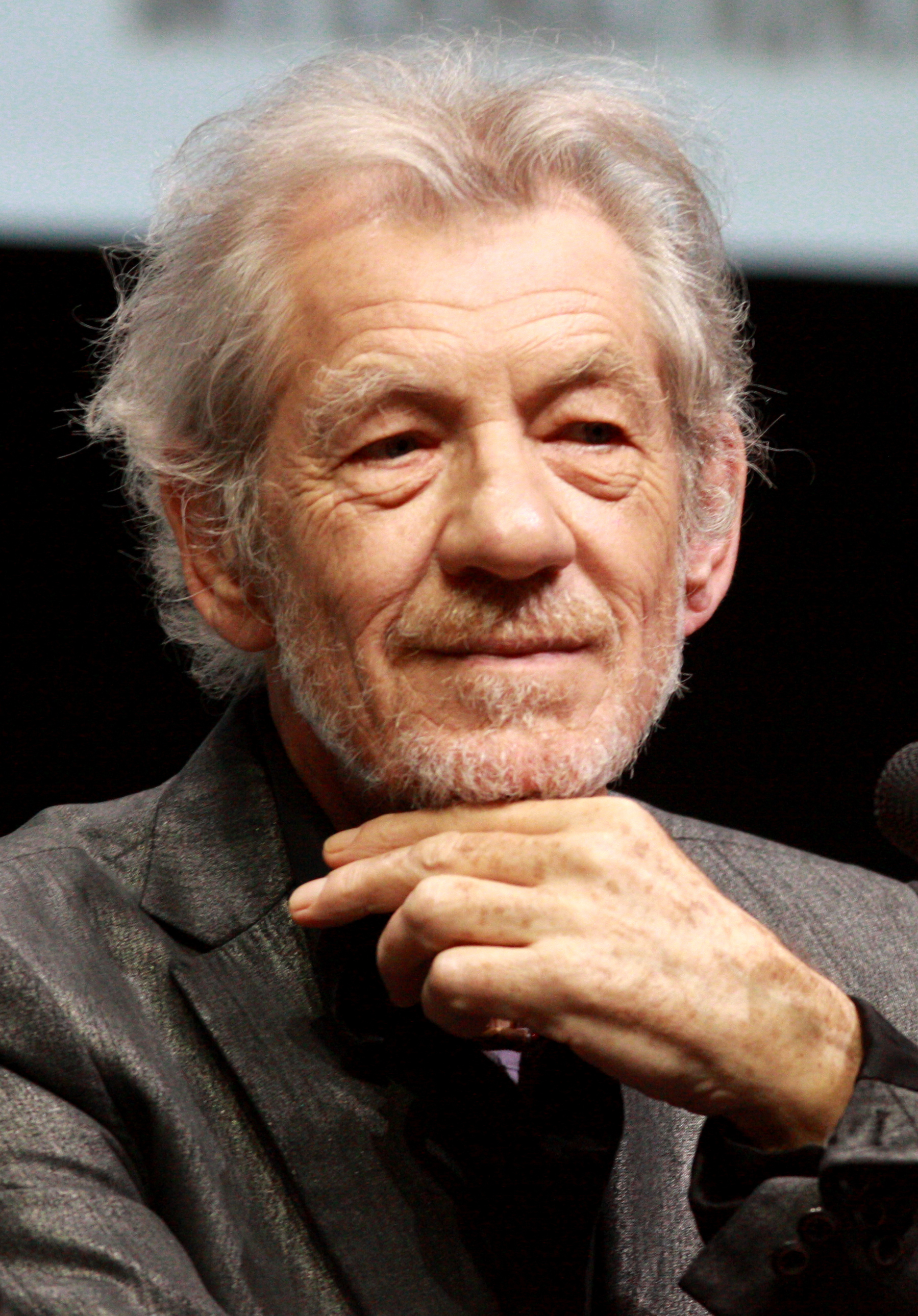
Ian McKellen received multiple accolades for his portrayal of Gandalf, including a nomination for Best Supporting Actor at the 74th Academy Awards.

The three films together were nominated for a total of 30 Academy Awards, of which they won 17, both records for any movie trilogy. The Fellowship of the Ring earned 13 nominations, the most of any film at the 74th Academy Awards, winning four; The Two Towers won two awards from six nominations at the 75th Academy Awards; The Return of the King won in every category in which it was nominated at the 76th Academy Awards, setting the reigning Oscar record for the highest clean sweep, and its 11 Academy Awards wins ties the record held by Ben-Hur (1959) and Titanic (1997). The Return of the King also became only the second sequel to win the Oscar for Best Picture after The Godfather Part II (1974).

Additionally, members of the production crew won the Academy Award for Technical Achievement for the rendering of skin textures on creatures on The Return of the King, and Stephen Regelous won the Academy Award for Scientific and Engineering Award for the design and development of MASSIVE, "the autonomous agent animation system used for the battle sequences in The Lord of the Rings trilogy."

The Lord of the Rings film series at the Academy Awards
Category
Category	74th Academy Awards	75th Academy Awards	76th Academy Awards
Category	The Fellowship of the Ring	The Two Towers	The Return of the King
Picture	Nominated	Nominated	Won
Director	Nominated		Won
Adapted Screenplay	Nominated		Won
Supporting Actor	Nominated (Note: For Ian McKellen as Gandalf.)		
Art Direction	Nominated	Nominated	Won
Cinematography	Won		
Costume Design	Nominated		Won
Film Editing	Nominated	Nominated	Won
Makeup	Won		Won
Original Score	Won		Won
Original Song	Nominated (Note: For "May It Be".)		Won (Note: For "Into the West".)
Sound Editing		Won	
Sound Mixing (Note: Before the 76th Academy Awards, and since the 93rd Academy Awards known as 'Best Sound'.)	Nominated	Nominated	Won
Visual Effects	Won	Won	Won

Each film in the series won the Hugo Award for Best Dramatic Presentation, the MTV Movie Award for Movie of the Year, and the Saturn Award for Best Fantasy Film. The first and third films also won the BAFTA Award for Best Film. The New York Film Critics Circle awarded The Return of the King its Best Picture Award at the 2003 Awards Ceremony, hosted by Andrew Johnston, chair of the organisation at that time, who called it "a masterful piece of filmmaking."

=== Comparisons with the written work ===
Commentators have compared Jackson's film trilogy with Tolkien's written work, remarking that while both have been extremely successful commercially, they differ in many respects. Critics have admired Jackson's ability to film the long and complex work at all; the beauty of the cinematography, sets, and costumes; and the epic scale of his version of Tolkien's story. They have, however, found the characters and the story greatly weakened by Jackson's emphasis on action and violence at the expense of psychological depth; the loss of Tolkien's emphasis on free will and individual responsibility; and the replacement of Frodo's inner journey by an American monomyth with Aragorn as the hero.

As for whether the film trilogy is faithful to the novel, opinions range from Verlyn Flieger's feeling that a film adaptation is not even worth attempting, Wayne G. Hammond's opinion that the film sacrifices the book's richness of characterization and narrative for violence, thrills, and cheap humour, or Christopher Tolkien's view that Jackson's interpretation is unacceptable, to granting, with Jackson and Boyens, that the film version is inevitably different. From that standpoint, scholars such as Brian Rosebury and Tom Shippey have described the films as a partial success, giving some of the feeling and capturing some of the key themes of the novel. Yvette Kisor considers that Jackson was unfaithful to many of Tolkien's details, but succeeded in achieving something of the same impact and feelings of providence, eucatastrophe, and interconnectedness. Dimitra Fimi suggests that Jackson was continuing Tolkien's tradition of adapting folklore, incorporating both the fans' views on that folklore, and cinematic traditions such as the zombie in the film trilogy to produce its own modern folklore.

== Home media ==
The first two films were released on two-disc standard edition DVDs containing previews of the following film. The success of the theatrical cuts brought about four-disc extended editions, with new editing, added special effects and music. Jackson came up with the idea of an extended cut for LaserDisc and DVD formats while in preproduction. He could insert some of the violence that he thought he would have to trim to get a PG-13 rating for the theatre and he could tailor the pacing to the demands of the small screen, which he said were "completely different". Jackson has stated that he considers the theatrical cuts to be the "definitive versions" of the films due to their deliberate pacing, but also that he believes the extended cuts will be "ultimately seen as the more definitive versions of the films".

The extended cuts of the films and the supplemental special features (dubbed "appendices") were spread over two discs each in a four-disc box set for each film. (Note: The folding cases are decorated with drawn concept art behind each DVD and an in-sleeve map of the Fellowship's travels during the film; a folding booklet includes guides to the menu options. A slipcase to enclose all three box sets was sold online.) A limited collector's edition was also released featuring sculpted bookends. The Fellowship of the Ring was released on 12 November 2002, containing 30 minutes of extra footage. (Note: The case features an Alan Lee painting of the Fellowship entering Moria, with the Moria Gate depicted on the back of the outer sleeve. An Argonath-styled bookend was included with the collector's edition.) The Two Towers, released on 18 November 2003, contains 44 minutes of extra footage. (Note: The case features a Lee painting of Gandalf the White's entrance. The collector's edition includes a Sméagol statue, with a crueller-looking statue of his Gollum persona available to order for a limited time.) The Return of the King was released on 14 December 2004, with 51 minutes more footage. (Note: The case exhibits a Lee painting of the Grey Havens. A model of Minas Tirith is included with the collector's edition, with Minas Morgul available by order for a limited time.) (Note: The extended editions also feature longer credit sequences listing the names of The Lord of the Rings fan-club members who contributed to the project.) The extended cuts have also played at cinemas, most notably the first two for a 16 December 2003 marathon screening (dubbed "Trilogy Tuesday") culminating in a screening of the third film. (Note: Attendees were given a limited-edition keepsake from Sideshow Collectibles containing a random frame of film from each of the three movies.) In 2006, both versions of each film were released together in a limited edition, which includes a new feature-length documentary for each film (but not the extras from the previous releases).

Warner Bros. released a box set of the trilogy's theatrical versions on Blu-ray on 6 April 2010. The four-disc extended sets were released on Blu-ray in a box set on 28 June 2011, with an additional disc including the feature-length documentary. In 2014, Blu-ray steelbook editions of the five-disc extended editions were released. In 2016, a six-disc Blu-ray was released containing only the theatrical films of both The Lord of the Rings and The Hobbit trilogies, as well as a 30-disc bookshelf-themed set of the extended versions of both trilogies and all the special features from previous releases. The Blu-ray releases were criticised for colour-timing issues which degraded the look of the films.

In 2020, both trilogies were released on Ultra HD Blu-ray, featuring both the theatrical and extended versions. All six films were remastered to give them a more consistent colour treatment. Jackson explained that visual effects shots were improved for this release by "[removing] and [painting] out any imperfections," but that they had not been "[upgraded] or [enhanced]". An audio remastering was made as well, with the films receiving a new Dolby Atmos mix. A 31-disc collector's set including both versions of all six films in 4K and Blu-ray formats, was released in 2021 for the 20-year anniversary of the first film; this, however, does not include the appendices.

By 2017, The Lord of the Rings films had a home-media revenue of more than $2.4 billion.

Film	Theatrical edition length	Extended edition length
The Fellowship of the Ring	178 minutes (2 hr, 58 min)	208 minutes (3 hr, 28 min)
The Two Towers	179 minutes (2 hr, 59 min)	223 minutes (3 hr, 43 min)
The Return of the King	201 minutes (3 hr, 21 min)	252 minutes (4 hr, 12 min)
Total runtime	558 minutes (9 hr, 18 min)	683 minutes (11 hr, 23 min)

== Legacy ==
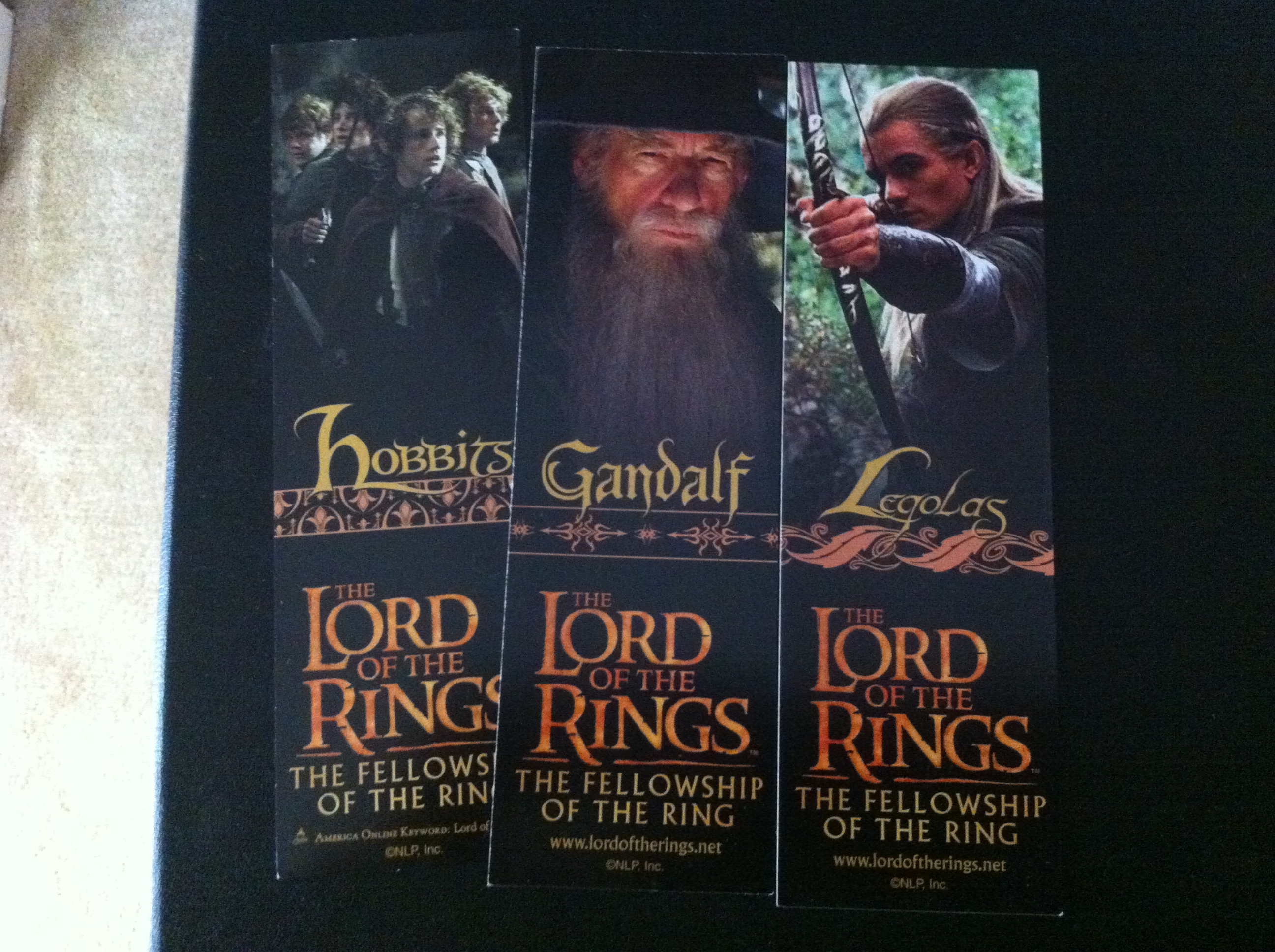
Some Lord of the Rings films themed bookmarks, an example of related merchandise.

The release of the films saw a surge of interest in The Lord of the Rings and Tolkien's other works, vastly increasing his impact on popular culture. The success of the films spawned numerous video games and many other kinds of merchandise.

=== Further films ===
==== The Hobbit trilogy ====
From 2012 to 2014 Peter Jackson and his studio Wingnut Films made The Hobbit trilogy consisting of the films The Hobbit: An Unexpected Journey, The Hobbit: The Desolation of Smaug and The Hobbit: The Battle of the Five Armies. The trilogy works as a prequel to The Lord of the Rings films. Though critics generally considered the trilogy to be inferior to the original films, it was still a financial success.

==== Additional films ====
In 2024, an anime prequel film titled The War of the Rohirrim was released. It is directed by Kenji Kamiyama, with Miranda Otto reprising her role from live-action, serving as the film's narrator. Additionally, two new live-action films are in development with Jackson returning as producer. The first of these, The Lord of the Rings: The Hunt for Gollum, will be directed by Andy Serkis for a planned release in December 2027. In March 2026, it was announced that Stephen Colbert, his son Peter McGee, and Philippa Boyens would be co-writing the script for a second film tentatively titled The Lord of the Rings: Shadow of the Past. Set decades following The Return of the King, the plot will detail chapters from The Fellowship of the Ring which were not adapted for the movie. In May 2026, Jackson said he was in early discussions with the Tolkien estate about potentially acquiring the rights to Tolkien's other writings such as The Silmarillion and Unfinished Tales of Númenor and Middle-earth.

=== Reunion ===
In 2020, the actor Josh Gad aired a virtual cast reunion as the fourth episode of the web series Reunited Apart, a charity fundraising effort during the COVID-19 pandemic, supporting Share Our Strength's campaign called "No Kid Hungry". Many actors from the original cast participated, along with Jackson, Boyens, and Shore. The charity raised over $100,000.

=== Effects on the film industry and tourism ===
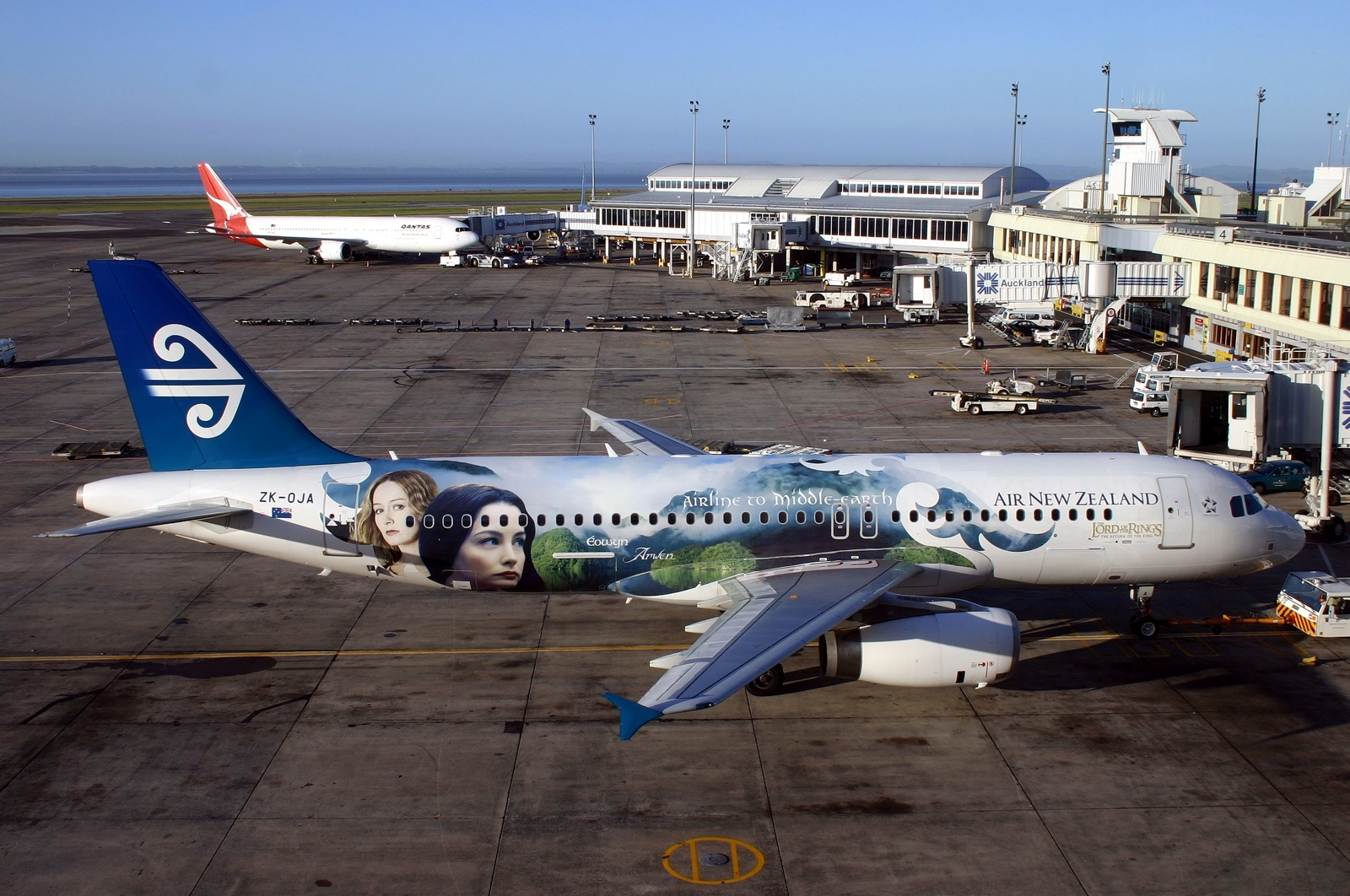
Air New Zealand painted this Airbus A320 in The Lord of the Rings livery to promote The Return of the King in 2004.

As a result of the series' success, Peter Jackson has become a major figure in the film industry in the mould of Steven Spielberg and George Lucas, in the process befriending some industry heavyweights like Bryan Singer and Frank Darabont. Jackson has since founded his own film production company, Wingnut Films, as well as Wingnut Interactive, a video game company. He was also finally given a chance to remake King Kong in 2005. The film was a critical and box office success, although not as successful as The Lord of the Rings series. Jackson has been called a "favourite son" of New Zealand. In 2004, Howard Shore toured with The Lord of the Rings Symphony, playing two hours of the score. Along with the Harry Potter films, the series has renewed interest in the fantasy film genre. As of 2005, tourism in New Zealand was up, possibly due to its exposure in the series, with the country's tourism industry waking up to an audience's familiarity.

In 2002, the Museum of New Zealand Te Papa Tongarewa in Wellington created a travelling exhibition of the film trilogy, The Lord of the Rings Motion Picture Trilogy: The Exhibition. It visited cities around the world including Boston, London, Sydney, Singapore, and Houston.

=== Legal disputes ===
The Lord of the Rings left a legacy of court cases over profits from the trilogy. Sixteen cast members (Noel Appleby, Jed Brophy, Mark Ferguson, Ray Henwood, Bruce Hopkins, William Johnson, Nathaniel Lees, Sarah McLeod, Ian Mune, Paul Norell, Craig Parker, Robert Pollock, Martyn Sanderson, Peter Tait, and Stephen Ure) sued over the lack of revenue from merchandise bearing their appearance. The case was resolved out of court in 2008. The settlement came too late for Appleby, who died of cancer in 2007. Saul Zaentz also filed a lawsuit in 2004 claiming he had not been paid all of his royalties.

The next year, Jackson sued the studio over profits from the first film, slowing development of The Hobbit prequels until late 2007. The Tolkien Trust filed a lawsuit in February 2008, for violating Tolkien's original deal over the rights that they would earn 7.5% of the gross from any films based on his works. The Trust sought compensation of $150 million. A judge denied them this option, but allowed them to win compensation from the act of the studio ignoring the contract itself. On 8 September 2009, the dispute was settled.

=== Video games ===
Numerous video games were released to supplement the film series. The Two Towers and The Return of the King are direct adaptations of the films. (Note: The Fellowship of the Ring video game is not based on the film. Electronic Arts incorporated some of the plot and footage into their Two Towers game.) Other games include The Third Age and its Game Boy Advance version, Tactics, The Battle for Middle-earth, The Battle for Middle-earth II and its expansion The Rise of the Witch-king, Conquest, Aragorn's Quest, War in the North, Lego The Lord of the Rings, Guardians of Middle-earth, Middle-earth: Shadow of Mordor, and Middle-earth: Shadow of War.

=== Influence ===
According to the scholar of digital media Ian Bogost, the success of the Lord of the Rings film trilogy brought about a resurgence of epic fantasy in the mainstream media. Productions thought to be inspired by the trilogy's success include the 2005–2008 animated series Avatar: The Last Airbender and the 2007 film The Golden Compass.

== Sources cited ==
- Nathan, Ian (2018). Anything You Can Imagine: Peter Jackson and the Making of Middle Earth. HarperCollins. ISBN 978-0-00819250-1.
