= MASSIVE (software) =

Visual effects software used for crowd generation

MASSIVE (Multiple Agent Simulation System in Virtual Environment) is a high-end computer animation and artificial intelligence software package used for generating crowd-related visual effects for film and television.

== Overview ==
Massive is a software package developed by Stephen Regelous for use in the visual effects industry. Its primary feature is its ability to rapidly create large groups of agents that can act as individuals, each with their own unique behaviors and actions.

Through the use of fuzzy logic, the software enables every agent to respond individually to its surroundings, including other agents. These reactions affect the agent's behavior, changing how they act by controlling pre-recorded animation clips. Blending between such clips creates characters that move, act, and react realistically. These pre-recorded animations can come from motion-capture sessions or they can be hand-animated in other 3D animation software packages.

In addition to the artificial intelligence abilities of Massive, there are numerous other features, including cloth simulation, rigid body dynamics and graphics processing unit (GPU) based hardware rendering. Massive Software has also created several pre-built agents ready to perform certain tasks, such as stadium crowd agents, rioting mayhem agents and simple agents who walk around and talk to each other.

== History ==
Massive was originally developed in Wellington, New Zealand. Peter Jackson, the director of the Lord of the Rings films (2001–2003), required software that allowed armies of hundreds of thousands of soldiers to fight, a problem that had not been solved in film-making before. Stephen Regelous created Massive to allow Wētā FX to generate many of the award-winning visual effects, particularly the battle sequences, for the Lord of the Rings films. Since then, it has developed into a complete product and has been licensed by a number of other visual effects houses.

Updates have allowed MASSIVE to be used with Maya and 3DS Max.

== Examples ==
Massive has been used in many productions, both commercials and feature-length films, small-scale and large.

Some significant examples include:

- The Lord of the Rings
- Rise of the Planet of the Apes
- Avatar
- The Chronicles of Narnia: The Lion, the Witch and the Wardrobe
- King Kong (Jackson, 2005)
- Radiohead - Go To Sleep (Music Video)
- Flags of our Fathers (besides battle and crowd scenes, even shots of seacraft crossing the Pacific were created with Massive)
- Carlton Draught: Big Ad
- Mountain, a television commercial for the PlayStation 2 console
- I, Robot
- Category 7: The End of the World
- Blades of Glory
- Eragon
- The Mummy: Tomb of the Dragon Emperor
- Happy Feet
- 300
- The Ant Bully (the first film to use computer-animated characters as Massive agents rather than motion capture. Also first to use facial animation within Massive)
- Buffy ("Chosen")
- Doctor Who ("Partners in Crime")
- Changeling
- Speed Racer (Car A.I. and crowds)
- WALL-E
- Up
- Life of Pi (Both the flying fish and meerkat sequences were created with the help of Massive)
- Epic
- The Hobbit
- Dawn of the Planet of the Apes
- Soul Snatcher
- World War Z
- Game of Thrones
- Black Panther
- Aquaman
- Avengers: Endgame

== See also ==
- Crowd simulation
- Multi-agent system
- Fuzzy logic
- Emergence
- Lightwave 3D
- Electric Image Animation System
- Cinema 4D
- Modo
- Blender
