= List of original characters in The Lord of the Rings film series =

This is a list of original characters in The Lord of the Rings film series, Peter Jackson's 2001–2003 film adaptation of J. R. R. Tolkien's 1954–1955 book.

== Brego ==
Brego the Horse belonged to King Théoden's son, Théodred, who had just been killed in a battle with Orcs. Aragorn speaks to Brego in Sindarin to quiet him. Aragorn says to Éowyn, "Turn this fellow free. He has seen enough of war." This first scene between Aragorn and Brego appears only in the extended version of The Two Towers.

Later, on the march to Helm's Deep, Aragorn is injured fighting Orcs on Wargs, falls off a cliff into a river, and is carried downstream. Brego then comes to the wounded Aragorn and lies down on the beach next to him so Aragorn can climb onto its back. He carries him the rest of the way to Helm's Deep. This side story does not exist in the book. Aragorn rides Brego in the charge out of Helm's Deep and to the Rohirrim camp at Dunharrow, but Brego runs away and refuses to enter the Paths of the Dead. It is unclear if the horse Aragorn rides to the Black Gate is Brego, though it has similar coloration.

Brego is largely played by a bay Dutch Warmblood stallion named Uraeus, who died in 2015. Before his movie career, Uraeus was an FEI dressage star. Ridden by his then-owner Lockie Richards, he won New Zealand National Dressage titles. Uraeus was brought out of semi-retirement to replace the horse previously cast as Brego, who turned out not to be adequate. At the end of the trilogy's filming, Mortensen had created such a strong bond with Uraeus that Richards agreed to sell the horse to him. Uraeus remains in New Zealand, looked after by Jane Abbott, one of the riding doubles who works on Peter Jackson's films. Uraeus had a movie double, a horse named Brownie who was trained for the scene where Brego finds Aragorn injured on a river bank, rolls him over and lies down so that Aragorn can scramble onto his back.

== Éothain and Freda ==
Éothain (played by Sam Comery) and Freda (played by Olivia Tennet) are young Rohirrim. They are sent by their mother Morwen (played by Robyn Malcolm) to alert Théoden that the "Wild Men" are raging through Rohan, burning villages. Éothain and Freda are kept at Edoras until they are reunited with their mother just before the battle at Helm's Deep. Éothain is named after a character in the book, one of Éomer's riders. The Éothain from Tolkien's novel The Two Towers was an adult member of Éomer’s éored that had overrun the Orcs who had captured Merry and Pippin, and later encountered Aragorn and his companions on the wide fields of Rohan. Éothain was not as trusting as his commander, scoffing at the idea that hobbits even existed, and arguing against the gift of horses to the three companions, especially Gimli.

== Figwit ==
Figwit is the fan-derived name for an Elf extra (played by Bret McKenzie) who first appears at the Council of Elrond, and later on the path to the Grey Havens. Figwit (or McKenzie, rather) has his own fan following. The name is an acronym of the sentence/question "Frodo Is Great, Who Is That?", something reportedly said/thought by fans who saw the character for the first time in The Fellowship of the Ring film. Later, for the movie The Hobbit: An Unexpected Journey, Bret McKenzie was given the name Lindir in response to fans' desires to see "Figwit" return to screen.

== Haleth ==
Haleth (played by Calum Gittins) son of Háma was among the boys who fought in the battle of Helm's Deep. His father was a member of the King's guard and doorward of Meduseld, who had been earlier killed by a Warg. Aragorn has a short inspirational talk with the boy. In the book, Háma is killed at Helm's Deep, and it is not mentioned if he has family. Tolkien uses the name Haleth for two characters of different sexes: a son of King Helm Hammerhand, who appears in the appendices of The Lord of the Rings, and a warrior-matriarch of the Edain in the First Age, who appears in The Silmarillion and Unfinished Tales.

== Irolas ==
Irolas informing Denethor about the apparent death of Faramir

Irolas (played by Ian Hughes) is an officer of Minas Tirith who appears after Faramir retreats from Osgiliath. He fights in the Battle of Minas Tirith. His name is derived from a variation of the name of the canonical Iorlas, an uncle of Bergil, a Gondorian boy whom Pippin befriends. This character was originally going to be Beregond, Bergil's father, who also befriends Pippin and is instrumental in saving Faramir from Denethor's funeral pyre, but according to the DVD commentary the role was so reduced that they felt it was not worth officially naming him "Beregond".

== Lurtz ==
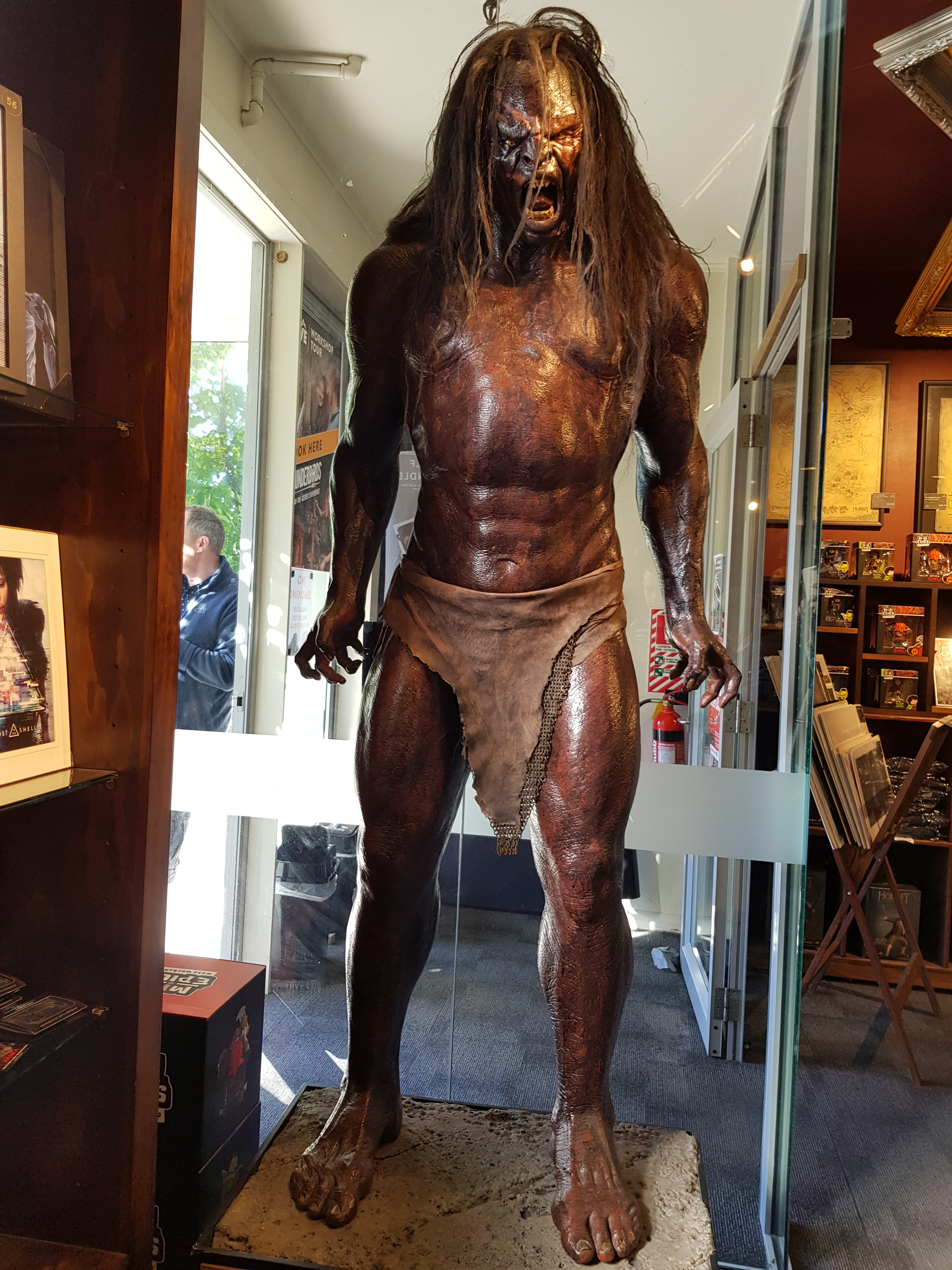
Model of Lurtz at the Weta Cave

Lurtz is one of the main antagonists of the first film. He is the first of Saruman's Uruk-hai to be bred and is their leader at the time of the attack on the Fellowship of the Ring at Amon Hen. He kills Boromir in battle, piercing him in the torso with three arrows from a distance (in the book, Boromir is slain by "many arrows"). As he prepares to finish Boromir, Aragorn intervenes and engages him in battle. Though Lurtz puts up a good fight, Aragorn eventually severs his right arm and stabs him in the stomach. Lurtz pulls Aragorn's sword further into his own stomach in an attempt to reach and maul him, but Aragorn quickly decapitates Lurtz, finally killing him.

He was played by Lawrence Makoare. Lurtz's name is never spoken aloud in the film, and is only known from the credits, merchandise, optional DVD subtitles, and DVD commentary.

== Madril ==
Madril (played by John Bach) is one of the Rangers of Ithilien who appears in The Lord of the Rings: The Two Towers and The Lord of the Rings: The Return of the King. He serves as an advisor and second-in-command to Faramir during his missions to Ithilien and Osgiliath, playing a role vaguely similar to the characters of Mablung and Damrod from the books.

Madril is amongst the Rangers of Ithilien who capture Frodo and Sam. He is seen discussing battle plans with Faramir, within the Ranger's hideout at Henneth Annun. When Faramir arrives to reinforce the garrison at Osgiliath, Madril reports the status of the city's defences. It is Madril who reminds Faramir that his life will be forfeit if he chooses to release Frodo and Sam, though Faramir still resolves to let them go.

In the extended edition of The Two Towers, Madril is also seen in the background of a scene, in which Boromir and Faramir are celebrating their victory at Osgiliath.

On the night of the assault on Osgiliath, Madril informs Faramir that he has sent scouts to Cair Andros to determine the activity of the Orcs in the North. However, the Rangers are caught unaware by the Orcs, who infiltrate Osgiliath with boats via the Anduin. Madril fights alongside Faramir in the battle, commanding a group of archers during the stand. Upon Madril's advice Faramir calls a retreat when it becomes clear that the Orcs are overrunning the city. While retreating from the city Madril is injured by an Orc while he is distracted by a Fell Beast, and is ultimately left behind whilst the other survivors escape to Minas Tirith. As he lies dying, Gothmog, the lieutenant of Minas Morgul, sees him upon the floor and cruelly impales him with a spear, killing him outright, before announcing to his army that the Age of Men is over.

Madril's name has no Sindarin meaning since it is a transposition of the middle letters of Mardil Voronwë, the first ruling Steward of Gondor.

== Morwen ==
Morwen (played by Robyn Malcolm) is the mother of Éothain and Freda. She shares her name with two canonical characters — Morwen, the wife of Húrin and mother of Túrin and Nienor, and Morwen Steelsheen, a Gondorian woman who married Thengel of Rohan and became the mother of Théoden.

== Sharku ==
Sharku was the orc captain of Saruman's Warg Riders. He is played by the actor Jed Brophy. In the film, he and his fellow riders were unleashed by Saruman to attack the Rohirrim of Edoras while they were journeying to Helm's Deep. He dies when Aragorn stabs him in the throat while grabbing onto his warg. The wound gives him a slow death, where he tells Gimli and Legolas that Aragorn died. The Warg rider attack (as well as most of the circumstances and its aftermath) is an invention by the scriptwriters. In the book, Sharkû is a name used for Saruman himself by his servants, meaning "old man". It is modified to "Sharkey" by his minions when they take over the Shire.
