= Stephen Regelous =

New Zealand animator

Stephen Regelous is a computer graphics software engineer from New Zealand. He is best known as the creator of the Massive simulation system that generated the battle scenes of the Peter Jackson movie trilogy The Lord of the Rings. In 2004, Regelous received an Academy Award for Scientific and Engineering Achievement. He is the founder of the company Massive Software.

Regelous was first employed by Barry Thomas's Yeti Productions as an animator and coding the first morphing software out of the USA. He then worked as a Technical Director on Jackson's earlier movie, The Frighteners. In 1996, Jackson asked Regelous to work on The Fellowship of the Ring, the first movie in the LOTR trilogy. Regelous was asked by Jackson to come up with a program that could create the huge battle scenes in the trilogy. Regelous wrote the software over several years and it was used in all three Lord of the Rings movies. The 'revolutionary' new software generated individual 'agents' which, at the time, were the closest any program had come to artificial intelligence in digital characters.
