= Character pairing in The Lord of the Rings =

Literary device in Tolkien's fiction

In his heroic romance The Lord of the Rings, J. R. R. Tolkien uses the literary device of pairings between characters to express some of their moral complexity. Commentators have noted that the format of a fantasy does not lend itself to subtlety of characterisation, but that pairing allows inner tensions to be expressed as linked opposites, including, in a psychoanalytic interpretation, those of Jungian archetypes.

Major pairings include those between the hobbits Frodo, Sam, and Gollum, the three of them linked by the Ring, by friendship, and by bonds of loyalty and of oath. This enables Tolkien to portray the good and evil sides of Frodo's character. The unheroic Frodo is further contrasted with the plainly heroic Aragorn. Among the kingly figures, the unhappy Steward of Gondor, Denethor, is paired both with the future king Aragorn and with the bold king of Rohan, Théoden. Pairings operate, too, among supporting characters, such as that between the elf-queen Galadriel and the giant spider Shelob, light opposing darkness.

== Context ==
The author of The Lord of the Rings, J. R. R. Tolkien, was a devout Roman Catholic, and intensely interested in expressing themes such as moral choice and the nature of evil in the world through his fantasy writing in the realm of Middle-earth. (Note: Carpenter 2023, #142)

The medievalist Marjorie Burns analyses in detail Tolkien's use of pairing to build a sense of the depth and complexity of his major characters. She grants that Tolkien did like to have separate good and bad characters suitable for a fantasy, but as a serious author interested in moral choice, he wanted at the same time to make his characters realistically complex and many-faceted. She states that this problem is not easy to resolve, but that Tolkien makes use of multiple methods; far from being unambiguously good or evil, his good characters have moments of "doubt, temptation, or irritability", while his bad, or in Catholic terms "fallen" characters have equivalent moments of uncertainty, "reconsider[ing] the choices they have made", as when, she writes, Gollum looks at the sleeping Frodo and Sam on the stairs of Cirith Ungol and almost loves them.

== Character pairings ==
Several scholars have noted that Tolkien makes use of character pairings. Brian Attebery, writing in The Cambridge Companion to Fantasy Literature, comments in its article on the literary theory of structuralism that while, like other fantasy authors, Tolkien's work "keeps its good and evil pretty much corralled separately", it can be seen "through a Lévi-Straussian lens, as offering multiple and contradictory versions of the same basic oppositions". Attebery sees pairings between the "sneaky" Gollum and the "loyal" Sam, and between both of them and Frodo; "unheroic" Frodo with the warrior Boromir; Boromir contrasted with his brother, the loyal and thoughtful Faramir, and with the "kingly" Aragorn. It states that "once alerted to this mode of doubling", the observant reader "can see unlikelier but suggestive" character pairings, such as Galadriel and Shelob, or Gandalf with Wormtongue. In this, Attebery suggests, Tolkien's fantasy resembles that of Ursula Le Guin, whose Earthsea tales begin in light-versus-darkness fantasy mode, but branch out into something much more complex, "a startlingly new structure of meaning". Anna Caughey, in A Companion to J. R. R. Tolkien, writes that Tolkien adds psychological depth by doubling several of his characters, noting the pairings of Faramir after Boromir; Sam after Aragorn; Frodo and his dark side, Gollum; and the two heroes, Aragorn and Frodo.

The Tolkien scholar Jane Chance contrasts Théoden, king of Rohan, with another "Germanic king", Denethor, the last Ruling Steward of Gondor. In Chance's view, Théoden represents good, Denethor evil; she notes that their names are almost anagrams, and that where Théoden welcomes the hobbit Merry Brandybuck into his service with loving friendship, Denethor accepts Pippin Took with a harsh contract of fealty. The medievalist Elizabeth Solopova contrasts the hero and future king Aragorn with the old Steward of Gondor, Denethor, who is incapable of such Northern courage. Shippey observes that Denethor's other opposite, Théoden, lives by Northern courage, and dies through Denethor's despair. Burns identifies and analyses numerous character pairings, noting that there are often further echoes: Gandalf's opposite may mainly be Saruman, but he is also paired with the Dark Lord Sauron, and for a moment also with the Balrog.

Character pairings analysed by Marjorie Burns
Good character	Bad character
Gandalf; Wizard, remaining loyal	Saruman; Wizard, corrupted by pride
Théoden; King of Rohan, reawakened to his power	Denethor; Failed Steward of Gondor who wants to be king
Frodo; Hobbit, ringbearer	Gollum; Hobbit turned monster, corrupted by the Ring
Galadriel; Elf-queen, associated with light	Shelob; Giant spider, associated with darkness

=== Darkness and light ===
The Tolkien scholar Christina Fawcett notes the different dichotomy with Shelob and the other giant evil spiders, especially Shelob's earliest ancestor Ungoliant. Rather than being directly paired with any individual, they are "consistently associated with darkness and entrapment, opposing themselves to liberty and light". Ungoliant, one-time ally of the first Dark Lord, Melkor, consumes the Two Trees of Valinor, which gave the world light, and emits "a cloak of darkness she wove about them when Melkor and Ungoliant set forth: an Unlight in which things seemed to be no more, and which eyes could not pierce, for it was void". Similarly, Shelob "weav[es] webs of shadow; for all living things were her food, and her vomit darkness". (Note: Tolkien 1954, book 4, ch. 9 "Shelob's Lair") Burns writes that Galadriel brings light, able to oppose Shelob's darkness effectively. Verlyn Flieger notes that the Phial of Galadriel holds the light of the Star of Elbereth, which in turn, by a complicated route of one fragmentation after another, is a surviving splinter of the light from the Two Trees of Valinor, the original light of creation.

=== A three-way pairing ===
William Bettridge, writing in Mythlore in 1990, noted that critics up to that time had found Tolkien's characters "variously silly, shallow, unreal, or confusing". In his view "a romantic quest myth", unlike a realistic work of fiction, requires the protagonist to be apart from other characters, leading the author to create archetypes rather than subtle characterisation. However, he writes, characters in myths do not have to be simple-minded, and pairing allows the story to use, say, Adam and Eve in the Genesis myth "as different aspects of mankind, instead of viewing them as discrete characters". He notes pairings such as Aragorn (true king of Gondor) versus Denethor and Gandalf versus Saruman, but considers the "zenith" of Tolkien's character pairing to be in his counterbalancing of Frodo, Sam, and Gollum. He notes that all of them are "of hobbit-kind". The protagonist Frodo, on his own, is depicted rather simply, even "monolithic[ally]", as anguished and weighed down more or less physically by the Ring. But his character, Bettridge argues, is fleshed out by Sam and Gollum. Sam represents the good, simple, loyal, and brave part of Frodo. Gollum represents the evil part of Frodo's character, desiring the Ring for himself. Sam is intolerant of Gollum's evil, reflecting Frodo's early, unthinking attitude to the creature. The three of them are bound together by their hobbit nature, by their quest, by bonds of loyalty and oath, and by the Ring itself. Together, they paint a picture of Frodo's complex personality.

The medievalist Alaric Hall notes the pairing of Frodo and Gollum, pointing out Gandalf's remark to Frodo that Bilbo escaped almost unscathed because of the pity and mercy which led him to spare Gollum's life: it was important to avoid the enemy's methods. Hall writes that Faramir and Gandalf are good where Boromir and Saruman are bad precisely because they remain innocent; this is what can overcome evil. For otherwise, as the Germanic myths emphasize, "heroes cannot defeat their enemies without taking something from them to themselves." The Ring, in particular, makes its wearer fade, and takes over their mind for evil, even if they are as powerful as Gandalf; Gandalf indeed refuses Frodo's offer of the ring, saying "For I do not wish to become like the Dark Lord himself". (Note: Tolkien 1954a, book 1, ch. 2 "The Shadow of the Past") Eventually Frodo, his name meaning "wise by experience", although surprisingly resilient, becomes unable to resist; but Sam, less wise, less led by his thoughts - his name, Samwise, means "half-wise" (Note: Tolkien 1955, Appendix F, 2, "On Translation") - remains strong to the end.

=== Jungian archetypes ===
Diagram of Patrick Grant's Jungian view of The Lord of the Rings with hero, anima and other archetypes

Patrick Grant, a scholar of Renaissance literature, took a different view of the character pairings in the work. He interpreted the interactions of the characters as fitting the oppositions and other pairwise relationships of Jungian archetypes, recurring psychological symbols proposed by Carl Jung. He stated that the hero appears in The Lord of the Rings both in noble and powerful form as Aragorn, and in childlike form as Frodo, whose quest can be interpreted as a personal journey of individuation. They are opposed by the Ringwraiths. Frodo's anima is the Elf-queen Galadriel, who is opposed by the evil giant female spider Shelob. The Old Wise Man archetype is filled by the wizard Gandalf, who is opposed by the corrupted wizard Saruman. Frodo's Shadow is, appropriately in Grant's view, also a male Hobbit, like Frodo. Aragorn has an Ideal Partner in Arwen, but also a Negative Animus in Eowyn, at least until she meets Faramir and chooses a happy union with him instead. All of these together create an image of the self.

== Sources ==
- Attebery, Brian (2012). James, Edward; Mendlesohn, Farah (eds.). The Cambridge Companion to Fantasy Literature. Cambridge University Press. ISBN 978-1-107-49373-5.
- Bettridge, William Edwin (1990). "Tolkien's "New" Mythology". Mythlore. 16 (4). Article 5.
- Burns, Marjorie (2005). Perilous Realms: Celtic and Norse in Tolkien's Middle-earth. University of Toronto Press. ISBN 978-0-8020-3806-7.
- Carpenter, Humphrey, ed. (2023) [1981]. The Letters of J. R. R. Tolkien: Revised and Expanded Edition. New York: HarperCollins. ISBN 978-0-35-865298-4.
- Caughey, Anna (2020) [2014]. "The Hero's Journey". In Lee, Stuart D. (ed.). A Companion to J. R. R. Tolkien. Wiley Blackwell. pp. 404–417. ISBN 978-1119656029. OCLC 1183854105.
- Chance, Jane (1980) [1979]. Tolkien's Art. Papermac. ISBN 978-0-333-29034-7.
- Fawcett, Christina (2014). J.R.R. Tolkien and the morality of monstrosity (PhD). University of Glasgow (PhD thesis).
- Flieger, Verlyn (1983). Splintered Light: Logos and Language in Tolkien's World. Wm. B. Eerdmans Publishing. ISBN 978-0-8028-1955-0.
- Grant, Patrick (1973). "Tolkien: Archetype and Word". Cross Currents (Winter 1973): 365–380. Archived from the original on 2021-12-03.
- Shippey, Tom (2005) [1982]. The Road to Middle-Earth: How J. R. R. Tolkien Created a New Mythology (Third ed.). HarperCollins. ISBN 978-0-261-10275-0.
- Solopova, Elizabeth (2009). Languages, Myths and History: An Introduction to the Linguistic and Literary Background of J. R. R. Tolkien's Fiction. New York City: North Landing Books. ISBN 978-0-9816607-1-4.
- Tolkien, J. R. R. (1954a). The Fellowship of the Ring. The Lord of the Rings. Boston: Houghton Mifflin. OCLC 9552942.
- Tolkien, J. R. R. (1954). The Two Towers. The Lord of the Rings. Boston: Houghton Mifflin. OCLC 1042159111.
- Tolkien, J. R. R. (1955). The Return of the King. The Lord of the Rings. Boston: Houghton Mifflin. OCLC 519647821.
- Tolkien, J. R. R. (1977). Christopher Tolkien (ed.). The Silmarillion. Boston: Houghton Mifflin. ISBN 978-0-395-25730-2.
