= Feudal allegiance in The Lord of the Rings =

Theme in Tolkien's fantasy

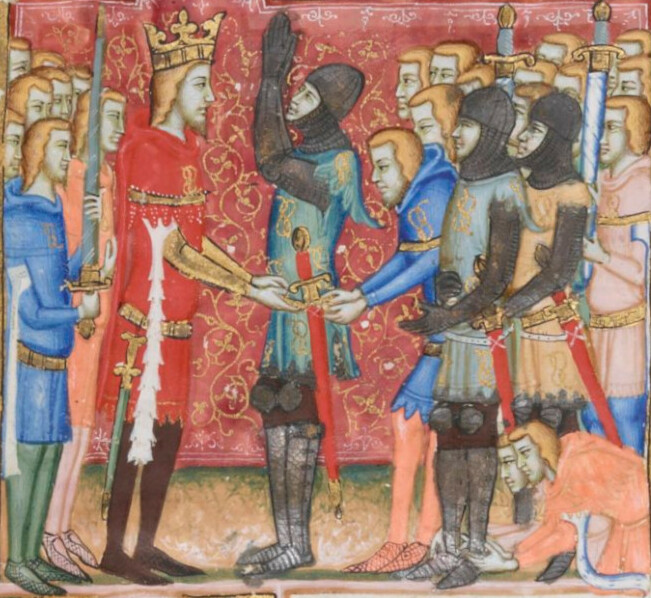
The scholar Jane Chance sees the character Faramir, son of the Steward of Gondor, as involved in multiple feudal-style allegiance-relationships in J. R. R. Tolkien's epic fantasy The Lord of the Rings.

Feudal allegiance is one of many themes in J. R. R. Tolkien's epic fantasy The Lord of the Rings. Central to some societies in the Middle Ages, the theme allows Tolkien to structure a complex set of relationships, to illustrate the medieval ideals of selfless courage through loyalty to one's lord, and to contrast pairs of characters according to how they handle these relationships.

== Context ==
In the Middle Ages, feudal allegiance was a central element in the structure of society. François Louis Ganshof (1944) described this as a set of reciprocal legal and military obligations between a warrior nobleman and his lord.

J. R. R. Tolkien wrote the heroic fantasy The Lord of the Rings in 1954–1955. It embodies many influences, but the Middle Ages in particular give the book much of its social framework. The book's attitude to time and change, too, is medieval: time evidently passes, there are wars and people die, but the framework of society does not shift: civilisation seems to be static, and the reader does not see changes in feudalism or the structures of government. In addition, its literary genre of "(heroic) fantasy" has become associated in Thomas Honegger's view with medieval heroic romance.

== Allegiances and betrayals around Frodo ==
The Tolkien scholar Jane Chance analyses an elaborate web of relationships based on a medieval Germanic worldview. She describes the brothers Faramir and Boromir as a pair of opposites, good and evil. Their father is Denethor, the Steward of Gondor, standing in for the King. There has been no King of Gondor for centuries, but in Gondor's rigidly feudal system, only a man of Gondor's royal line can take its throne. (Note: Tolkien 1955, book 5, ch. 1 "Minas Tirith") Chance likens the pairing of the two brothers to the contrasting rulers Théoden, King of the horse-realm of Rohan, and Denethor, whom she considers a pair of good and evil "Kings". She explores what she sees as a series of parallel instances of feudal allegiance (a man's oath of service to his lord, in return for protection) and betrayal (the breaking of that oath) involving the hobbit Frodo Baggins.

The hobbit Sam Gamgee serves his master Frodo faithfully, but accidentally betrays him to Faramir, first with the smoke from his cooking fire, and then by mentioning the Ring.

The monster Gollum's allegiance to Frodo is in the form of an oath sworn on the Ring, to obey Frodo and not to run off. Frodo "betrays" Gollum by luring him into the captivity of Faramir's men. Gollum then swears to Faramir that he will never return to the forbidden pool, which is just outside Faramir's secret stronghold in Ithilien. Gollum may have a distorted morality, but he still expects Frodo to be true to his word, and feels betrayed when Frodo effectively deceives him into Faramir's captivity, however good Frodo's motives may have been. The reader, on the other hand, perceives that Frodo has chosen faithfully and as such is following the feudal code of a good lord and master.

The last of the parallel allegiance relationships is that Faramir grants Frodo protection, in the manner of a Germanic lord, and in return Frodo offers his service.

Imagemap with clickable links. Allegiances and betrayals around Frodo and Faramir, as analysed by Jane Chance

== Allegiances of hobbits to Germanic lords ==
Chance discusses the role of the hobbits Pippin and his friend Merry, in illuminating the contrast between what she calls the "good and bad Germanic lords Théoden and Denethor". Tom Shippey notes the "antithetical" symmetry in the relationships with the two lords, commenting that this depicts the contrasting cultures of the two kingdoms. Chance writes that the two leaders each receive the allegiance of a hobbit, but very differently. Denethor, powerful Steward of Gondor, undervalues Pippin because he is small, and binds him with a formal oath, whereas Théoden, King of Rohan, treats Merry with love, which the hobbit responds to in kind.

Shippey adds that Tolkien uses the two hobbits and their low simple humour as foils for the much higher romance to which he was aspiring with the more heroic and kingly figures of Théoden, Denethor, and Aragorn: an unfamiliar and old-fashioned writing style that might otherwise, Shippey writes, have lost his readers entirely.

Jane Chance's analysis of the contrast of the fealty of the hobbits Merry and Pippin to the lords Denethor and Théoden
Story element	Denethor, Steward of Gondor	Théoden, King of Rohan
A hobbit swears allegiance	Pippin becomes a palace guard of Gondor	Merry joins the Riders of Rohan
The lord's estimation	undervalues Pippin because he is small	treats Merry with love, as an equal
The lord's action	binds Pippin with a severe formal oath	welcomes Merry, accepts his loyalty
The hobbit's response	Pippin is moved by pride	Merry spontaneously loves the King

== Deserved loyalty ==
Feudal loyalty was a Germanic ideal, seen in Old English poems such as Beowulf. Franco Manni writes that Tolkien wanted the ideal to be that "desperate courage" was a moral good provided that it was driven purely by a vassal's loyalty to his lord: it had to be free of any desire for personal advancement or glory.

Colleen Donnelly writes that medieval-style feudal vassals owe their lord allegiance, but only if the lord actually deserves it. When Denethor seeks to kill himself and his son Faramir, both Pippin and a soldier of the citadel guard, Beregond, see that the time has come to take action. In Beregond's case, that actually involves using force against his lord's wishes, which means breaking his oath of allegiance. Beregond has no option but to make a choice: obey Denethor or save Faramir. When Aragorn becomes King of Gondor, he makes Beregond a servant of Faramir, effectively rewarding him for his wise choice, and accepting that it was not treasonous to disobey Denethor in that situation.

== For the greater good ==
Both Gollum and Wormtongue are distorted characters, and both end up disloyal to their masters. Donnelly notes that they are both "eaten up by desire", but comments that where Wormtongue is irredeemably full of treason against his lord, King Théoden of Rohan, Gollum remains open to kindness and can still intend to do good and honest service. Both characters end up unintentionally doing good through what seems to be an evil act: Wormtongue slits his new master Saruman's throat, helping to end the harm being done to the hobbits' home, the Shire; while Gollum, desperate to get the One Ring, bites it off his master Frodo's finger and falls to his death, with the Ring, into the fires of Mount Doom, thus destroying the Ring and ending the Dark Lord Sauron's reign.

Colleen Donnelly's comparison of disloyal characters
Character	Disloyal, as he desires	Remediability	Greater good through evil act
Gollum	The One Ring	Open to kindness; can intend to do good	Bites the Ring from Frodo's finger, falling with it into the Cracks of Doom, so saving Middle-earth from Sauron
Wormtongue	Wealth, and Éowyn	Entirely treasonous	Kills his new master Saruman, helping to end harm caused to the Shire

== Sources ==
- Chance, Jane (1980) [1979]. Tolkien's Art: 'A Mythology for England'. Macmillan. ISBN 978-0-333-29034-7.
- Donnelly, Colleen (2007). "Feudal Values, Vassalage, and Fealty in The Lord of the Rings". Mythlore. 25 (3/4): 17–27.
- Ganshof, François Louis (1996) [1944]. "The Classical Age of Feudalism: Introduction". Feudalism. Translated by Grierson, Philip. Canada: University of Toronto Press. p. 65. ISBN 0-8020-7158-9.
- Honegger, Thomas (1 November 2010). "(Heroic) Fantasy and the Middle Ages – Strange Bedfellows or an Ideal Cast?". Itinéraires (2010–3): 61–71. doi:10.4000/itineraires.1817.
- Manni, Franco (2009). "Real and imaginary history in The Lord of the Rings". Mallorn (47): 28–37.
- Shippey, Tom (2001). J. R. R. Tolkien: Author of the Century. HarperCollins. ISBN 978-0261-10401-3.
- Shippey, Tom (2005) [1982]. The Road to Middle-Earth: How J. R. R. Tolkien Created a New Mythology (Third ed.). HarperCollins. ISBN 978-0-261-10275-0.
- Tolkien, J. R. R. (1955). The Return of the King. The Lord of the Rings. Boston: Houghton Mifflin. OCLC 519647821.
