= Themes of The Lord of the Rings =

Academic analyses of Tolkien's ideas embodied in The Lord of the Rings

Scholars and critics have identified many themes of The Lord of the Rings, a major fantasy novel by J. R. R. Tolkien, including a reversed quest, the struggle of good and evil, death and immortality, fate and free will, the danger of power, and various aspects of Christianity such as the presence of three Christ figures, for prophet, priest, and king, as well as elements such as hope and redemptive suffering. There is also a strong thread throughout the work of language, its sound, and its relationship to peoples and places, along with moralisation from descriptions of landscape. Out of these, Tolkien stated that the central theme is death and immortality.

Some modern commentators have criticised Tolkien for supposed failings in The Lord of the Rings, such as not including significant women, not being relevant to city-dwellers, not overtly showing any religion, and for racism, though others have defended Tolkien against all these charges.

== Reversed quest ==
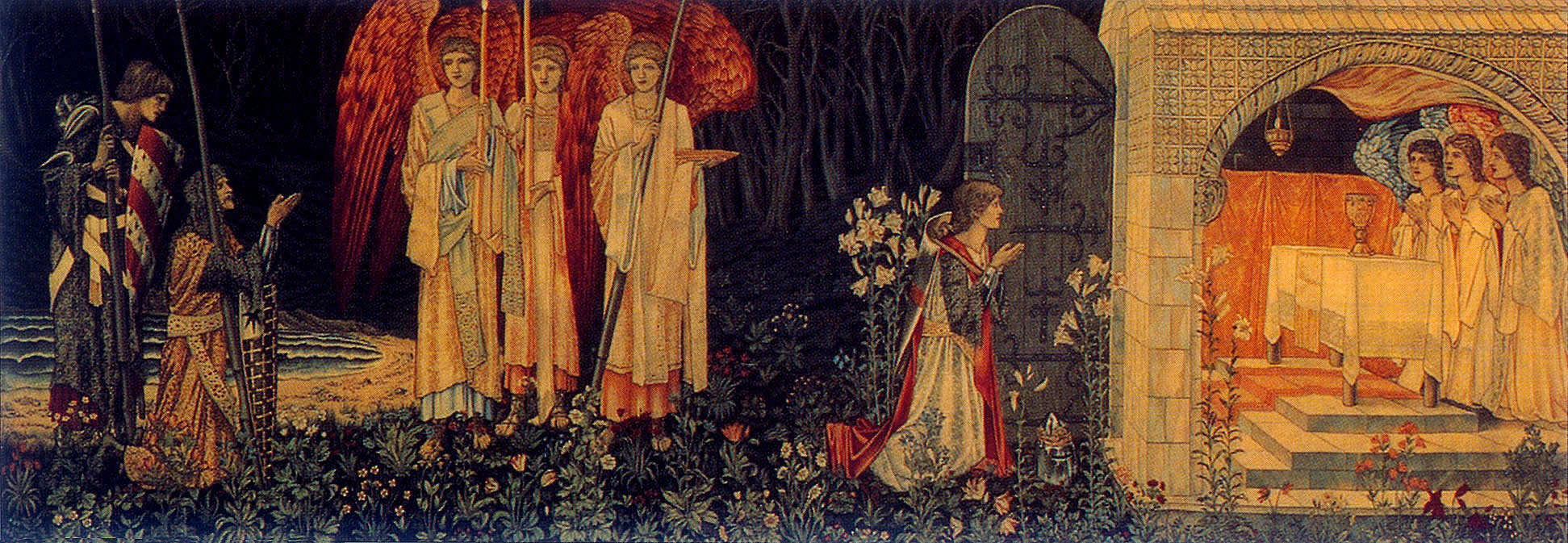
Unlike a typical quest such as seeking the Holy Grail of Arthurian legend, Frodo's is to destroy an object, the One Ring. Vision of the Holy Grail by William Morris, 1890.

The Tolkien critic Richard C. West writes that the story of The Lord of the Rings is basically simple: the hobbit Frodo Baggins's quest is to take the Dark Lord Sauron's Ring to Mount Doom and destroy it. He calls the quest "primary", along with the war against Sauron. The critic David M. Miller agrees that the quest is the "most important narrative device" in the book, but adds that it is reversed from the conventional structure: the hero is not seeking a treasure, but is hoping to destroy one. (Note: Other authors such as Michael N. Stanton and Lori M. Campbell agree that it is an "inverted quest".) He notes that from Sauron's point of view, the tale is indeed a quest, and his evil Black Riders replace the traditional "errant knights seeking the holy of holies", while the Fellowship keeping the Ring from him cannot use it: thus there are multiple reversals. The Tolkien critic Tom Shippey concurs that it is "an anti-quest", a story of renunciation. He writes that Tolkien had lived through two world wars, the "routine bombardment" of civilians, the use of famine for political gain, concentration camps and genocide, and the development and use of chemical and nuclear weapons. Shippey states that the book raises the question of whether, if the ability of humans to produce that kind of evil could somehow be destroyed, even at the cost of sacrificing something, this would be worth doing.

== Antitheses ==
"No careful reader of Tolkien's fiction can fail to be aware of the polarities that give it form and fiction", writes Verlyn Flieger. Tolkien's extensive use of duality and parallelism, contrast and opposition is found throughout the novel, in pairings such as hope and despair, knowledge and enlightenment, death and immortality, fate and free will, good and evil.

=== Death and immortality ===
Tolkien stated in his Letters that the core theme of The Lord of the Rings is death and the human desire to escape it:

But I should say, if asked, the tale is not really about Power and Dominion: that only sets the wheels going; it is about Death and the desire for deathlessness. Which is hardly more than to say it is a tale written by a Man! (Note: Carpenter 2023, #203 to Herbert Schiro, 17 November 1957)

He commented further:

It is mainly concerned with Death, and Immortality; and the 'escapes': serial longevity, and hoarding memory. (Note: Carpenter 2023, #211 to Rhona Beare, 14 October 1958)

An appendix tells The Tale of Aragorn and Arwen, in which the immortal elf Arwen chooses mortality so that she can marry the mortal man Aragorn. After more than two hundred years of life, Aragorn chooses the time of his death, leaving behind a heartbroken and now-mortal Arwen. She travels to the faded remains of Lothlórien, where she was once blissfully happy, to die on the green hill of Cerin Amroth. This theme recurs throughout the book, and in specific sayings and poems such as Gilraen's linnod and the Lament of the Rohirrim.

=== Good and evil ===
Imagemap with clickable links of Tolkien's moral geography of Middle-earth, according to John Magoun (Note: Other scholars such as Walter Scheps and Isabel G. MacCaffrey have noted Middle-earth's "spatial cum moral dimensions".)

The Lord of the Rings presents a sharp polarity between good and evil. Orcs, the most maligned of races, are in one interpretation a corruption of the mystically exalted race of the Elves. Minas Morgul, the Tower of Sorcery, home of the Lord of the Nazgûl, the most corrupted King of Men, directly opposes Minas Tirith, the Tower of Guard and the capital of Gondor, the last visible remnant of the ancient kingdom of Men in the Third Age. Mordor, the land of the Dark Lord Sauron, is opposed to Gondor and to all free peoples. These antitheses, though pronounced and prolific, are sometimes considered to be too polarizing, but they have also been argued to be at the heart of the structure of the entire story. Tolkien's technique has been seen to "confer literality on what would in the primary world be called metaphor and then to illustrate [in his secondary world] the process by which the literal becomes metaphoric". The theologian Fleming Rutledge argues, on the other hand, that Tolkien aims instead to show that no definite line can be drawn between good and evil, because "'good' people can be and are capable of evil under certain circumstances".

=== Fate and free will ===
In the chapter "The Shadow of the Past", Gandalf discusses the possibility that Bilbo was meant to find the Ring, and that Gollum has an important part to play, the clearest testament to the role of fate in The Lord of the Rings. Beyond Gandalf's words, the story is structured in such a way that past decisions have a critical influence on current events. For instance, because Bilbo and Frodo spared Gollum, Gollum was able to destroy the Ring by falling into the Cracks of Doom while Frodo failed to destroy it. Thus Frodo, who is overpowered by the evil Ring, is saved by what seems to be luck.

The role of fate in The Lord of the Rings is contrasted sharply with the prominent role also given to personal choice and will. Frodo's voluntary choice to bear the Ring to Mordor is central to the plot of the whole story. Also important is Frodo's willing offer of the Ring to Gandalf, Aragorn, and Galadriel, and their willing refusal of it, not to mention Frodo's final inability to summon the will to destroy it. Thus, both will and fate play out throughout the story: from Sam's vision of old Gaffer Gamgee's wheelbarrow and the Scouring of the Shire in the Mirror of Galadriel, to Arwen Evenstar's choice of mortality.

Peter Kreeft notes that divine providence, in the form of the will of the Valar, expressing the will of Eru Ilúvatar, can determine fate. Gandalf says, for example, that a hidden power was at work when Bilbo found the One Ring as it was attempting to return to its master.

=== Gain and loss ===
The Tolkien scholar Marjorie Burns notes in Mythlore that the book's "sense of inevitable disintegration" is borrowed from the Nordic world view which emphasises "imminent or threatening destruction". She writes that in Norse mythology, this process seemed to have started during the creation: in the realm of fire, Muspell, the jötunn Surt was even then awaiting the end of the world. Burns comments that, "Here is a mythology where even the gods can die, and it leaves the reader with a vivid sense of life's cycles, with an awareness that everything comes to an end, that, though [the evil] Sauron may go, the elves will fade as well."

Patrice Hannon, also in Mythlore, states that:

The Lord of the Rings is a story of loss and longing, punctuated by moments of humor and terror and heroic action but on the whole a lament for a world—albeit a fictional world—that has passed even as we seem to catch a last glimpse of it flickering and fading...

In Hannon's view, Tolkien meant to show that beauty and joy fail and disappear before the passage of time and the onslaught of the powers of evil; victory is possible but only temporary. She gives multiple examples of elegiac moments in the book, such as that Bilbo is never again seen in Hobbiton, that Aragorn "came never again as living man" to Lothlórien, or that Boromir, carried down the Anduin in his funeral boat, "was not seen again in Minas Tirith, standing as he used to stand upon the White Tower in the morning". Since he was dead, Hannon writes, this was hardly surprising; the observation is elegiac, not informational. Even the last line of the final appendix, she notes, has this tone: "The dominion passed long ago, and [the Elves] dwell now beyond the circles of the world, and do not return."

Hannon compares this continual emphasis on the elegiac to Tolkien's praise for the Old English poem Beowulf, on which he was an expert, in Beowulf: The Monsters and the Critics, suggesting that he was seeking to produce something of the same effect:

For it is now to us itself ancient; and yet its maker was telling of things already old and weighted with regret, and he expended his art in making keen that touch upon the heart which sorrows have that are both poignant and remote. If the funeral of Beowulf moved once like the echo of an ancient dirge, far-off and hopeless, it is to us as a memory brought over the hills, an echo of an echo.

=== Environmentalism and technology ===
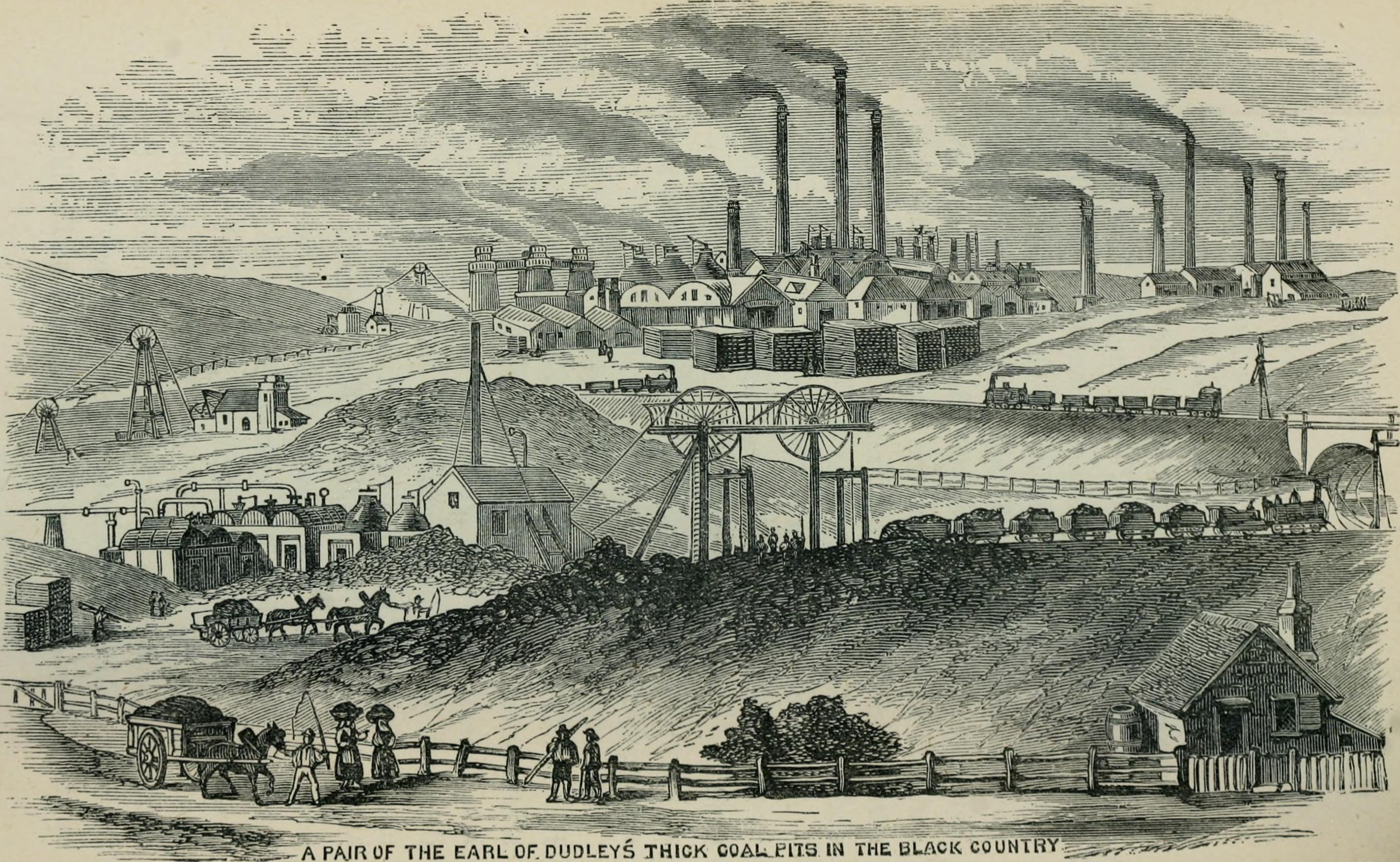
Mines, ironworks, smoke, and spoil heaps: the Black Country, near Tolkien's childhood home, has been suggested as an influence on his depictions of industrial hell, such as Mordor.

Tolkien's environmentalism and his criticism of technology has been observed by several authors. Anne Pienciak notes that technology is only employed by the forces of evil in Tolkien's works, and that he found it to be one of "the evils of the modern world: ugliness, depersonalization, and the separation of man from nature". This technophilia is seen in Saruman's character and in his name: the Old English searu, or in the Old Mercian dialect saru, means "skilful, ingenious". It is associated in Beowulf with smithcraft, as in the phrase "searonet seowed, smiþes orþancum", "ingenious-net woven, by a smith's cunning": perfect for "a cunning man", a wizard. Saruman's city of Isengard has been described as an "industrial hell", and his "wanton destruction" of Middle-earth's trees to fuel his industrial machines as revealing his "evil ways". The chapter "The Scouring of the Shire" sees the industrial technology imported by Saruman's minions as an evil threat to the natural environment, replacing the traditional crafts of the Shire hobbits with noisy polluting mills full of machinery.

Andrew O'Hehir wrote in Salon that the hobbits' homeland, the Shire, was inspired by the "woods and hills" near Sarehole. Tolkien lived there during his childhood, and was horrified decades later to find the area urbanised. O'Hehir notes that Mordor is characterised by "its slag heaps, its permanent pall of smoke, its slave-driven industries", and that Saruman is depicted as an ideological representative of technological utopianism, who forcibly industrialises the Shire. O'Hehir calls the novel a lament over the impact of the Industrial Revolution and the environmental degradation of England's formerly "green and pleasant land". In this, in O'Hehir's view, Tolkien's sentiments are like those of Thomas Hardy, D. H. Lawrence, and William Blake.

=== Pride and courage ===
Tolkien explores the theme of "the ennoblement of the ignoble". The scholar of English literature Devin Brown links this with the Magnificat's, "He hath put down the mighty from their seats, and exalted them of low degree." He gives as example the humble hobbits who defeat the proud and powerful Sauron. Tolkien's biographers Richard J. Cox and Leslie Jones write that the heroes who destroy the Ring and scour the Shire are "the little guys, literally. The message is that anyone can make a difference"; they call this one of Tolkien's main themes.

Tolkien contrasted courage through loyal service with arrogant desire for glory. While Sam follows Frodo out of loyalty and would die for him, Boromir is driven by pride in his desire for the Ring, and would risk the lives of others for his personal glory. Likewise the refusal of the ring by Sam, Faramir, and Galadriel is a courageous rejection of power and glory and personal renown. Courage in the face of overwhelming odds is a recurring theme. Tolkien stated in The Monsters and the Critics that he was inspired by the apocalyptic Norse legend of Ragnarök, where the gods know that they are doomed in their final battle for the world, but go to fight anyway. Frodo and Sam share this "northern courage", knowing they have little prospect of returning home from their mission to Mount Doom.

== Addiction to power ==
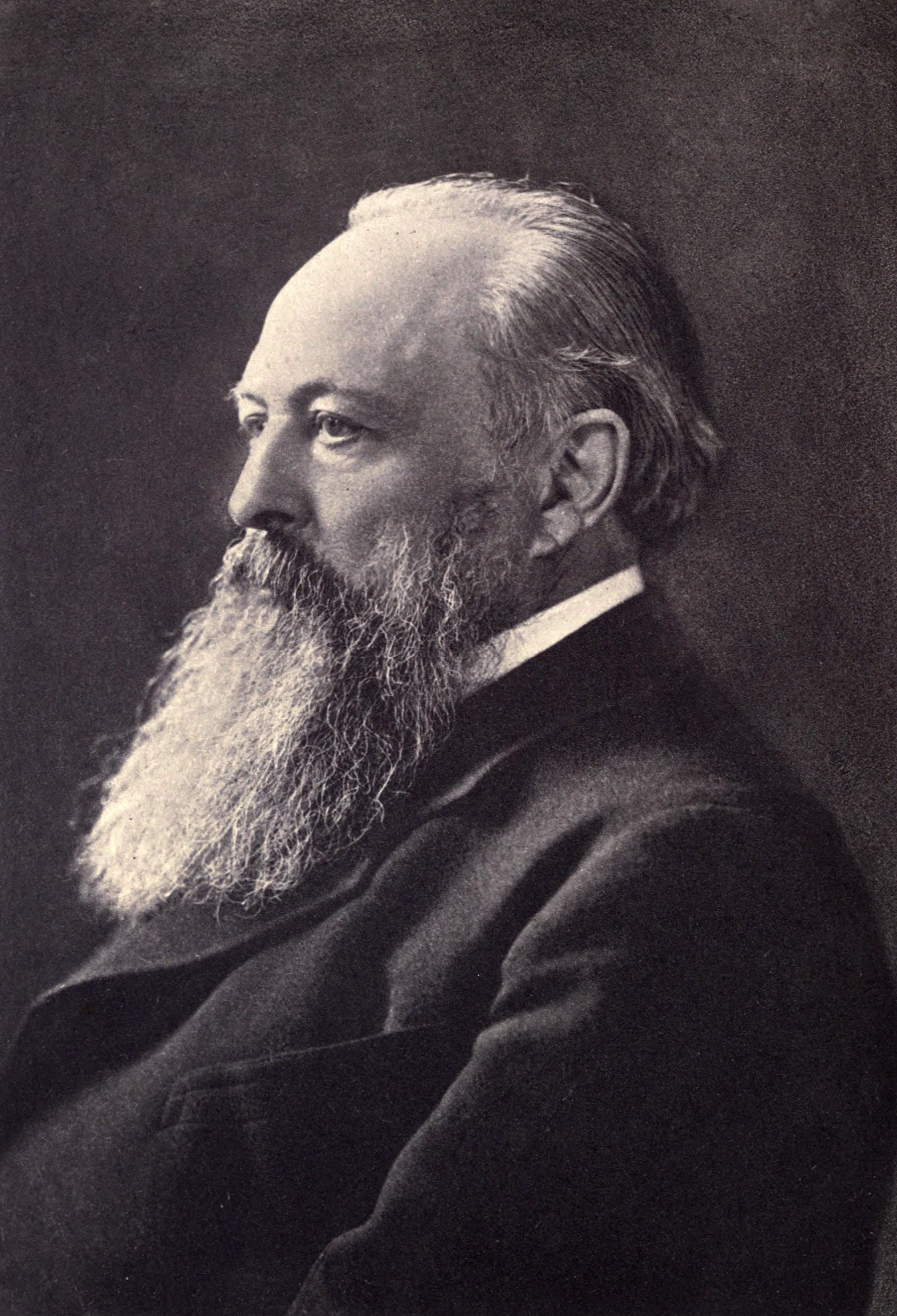
Lord Acton famously stated "Power tends to corrupt, and absolute power corrupts absolutely", an idea embodied in the addictive power of the One Ring.

A major theme is the corrupting influence of the One Ring through the power it offers, especially to those already powerful. Tom Shippey notes Gandalf's statements about the corrupting influence the Ring has on its bearers. The powerful Gandalf, Elrond, Galadriel, Aragorn and Faramir all reject it, believing that it would overpower them. The Hobbits Frodo and Sam, much less ambitious for power, are less susceptible but not totally immune to its effects, as can be seen in the changes it works in Frodo, Bilbo and Gollum. On the other hand, Boromir becomes murderously obsessed with the Ring, but never possesses it, while Sméagol kills his friend Déagol, the first Ringbearer after Isildur, to obtain it.

The corrupting effect of power is, according to Shippey, a modern theme, since in earlier times, power was considered to "reveal character", not alter it. Shippey quotes Lord Acton's 1887 statement:

Power tends to corrupt, and absolute power corrupts absolutely. Great men are almost always bad men

Critics have argued that this theme can be found as far back as Plato's The Republic, where the character Glaucon argued that doing justice to others is never to one's benefit; he cited the mythical Ring of Gyges, which could make any man who wore it invisible and thus able to get away with theft or other crime. Glaucon claimed that such power would corrupt any man, and that therefore no man truly believes that acting justly toward others is good for him.

Colin Manlove criticises Tolkien's attitude towards power as inconsistent, with exceptions to the supposedly overwhelming influence of the Ring. The Ring can be handed over relatively easily (Sam and Bilbo), and removing the Ring by force (Gollum to Frodo) does not, despite Gandalf's assertion at the beginning of the story, break Frodo's mind. The Ring also appears to have little effect on characters such as Aragorn, Legolas and Gimli.

Shippey replies to Manlove's doubt with "one word": addictive. He writes that this sums up Gandalf's whole argument, as in the early stages, as with Bilbo and Sam, the addiction can be shaken off easily enough, while for those who are not yet addicted, as with Aragorn and indeed others such as Galadriel and Faramir, its pull is like any other temptation. What Gandalf could not do to Frodo, Shippey writes, is make him want to hand the Ring over. And for the owner of the Ring, the destructive aspect is the urge to use it, no matter how good the intentions of the owner might be at the start.

== Christianity ==
=== Applicability, not allegory ===
Tolkien stated in the foreword to the second edition of The Lord of the Rings that, "it is neither allegorical nor topical ... I cordially dislike allegory in all its manifestations ... I much prefer history, true or feigned, with its varied applicability to the thought and experience of readers." (Note: Tolkien 1954a "Foreword to the Second Edition") Shippey comments that Tolkien certainly did sometimes write allegories, giving the example of Leaf by Niggle, and that there is meant to be some relationship between his fiction and fact. He notes, too, that Tolkien deliberately "approach[ed] to the edge of Christian reference" by placing the destruction of the Ring and the fall of Sauron on 25 March, the traditional Anglo-Saxon date of the crucifixion of Christ and of the annunciation, and of the last day of the Genesis creation. Other commentators have noted further echoes of Christian themes, including the presence of Christ figures, the resurrection, hope, and redemptive suffering.

=== Christ figures ===
The philosopher Peter Kreeft, like Tolkien a Roman Catholic, observes that there is no one complete, concrete, visible Christ figure in The Lord of the Rings comparable to Aslan in C. S. Lewis's Chronicles of Narnia series. However, Kreeft and Jean Chausse have identified reflections of the figure of Jesus Christ in three protagonists of The Lord of the Rings: Gandalf, Frodo and Aragorn. While Chausse found "facets of the personality of Jesus" in them, Kreeft wrote that "they exemplify the Old Testament threefold Messianic symbolism of prophet (Gandalf), priest (Frodo), and king (Aragorn)".

Peter Kreeft's analysis of Christ-figures in The Lord of the Rings
Christ-like attribute	Gandalf	Frodo	Aragorn
Sacrificial death, resurrection	Dies in Moria, reborn as Gandalf the White (Note: Other commentators such as Jane Chance have compared this transformed reappearance to the Transfiguration of Jesus.)	Symbolically dies under Morgul-knife, healed by Elrond (Note: Also by other commentators, such as Mathews, Richard (2016). Fantasy: The Liberation of Imagination. Routledge. p. 69. ISBN 978-1-136-78554-2.)	Takes Paths of the Dead, reappears in Gondor
Saviour	All three help to save Middle-earth from Sauron		
threefold Messianic symbolism	Prophet	Priest	King

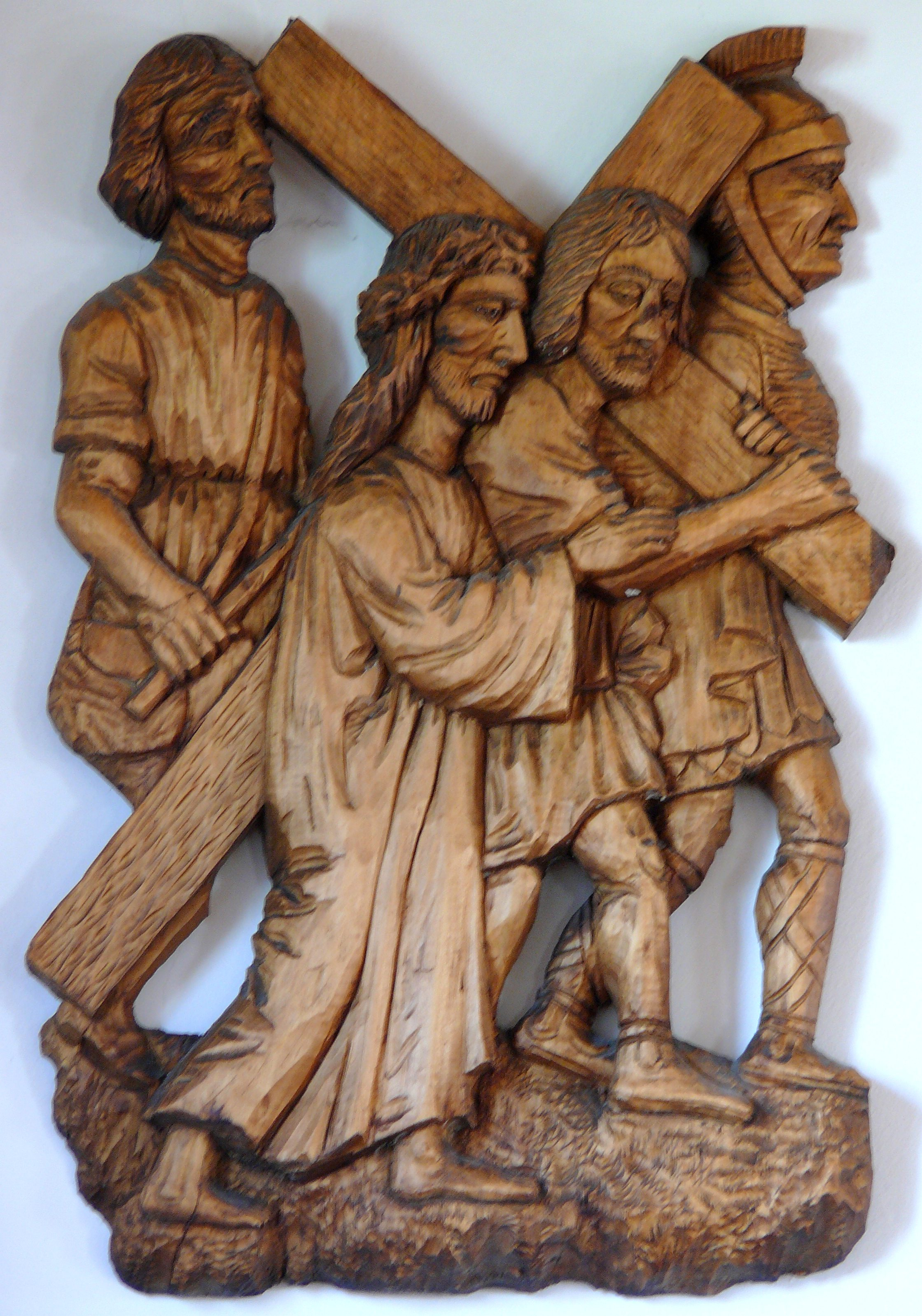
Commentators have compared Frodo to Christ, and Sam, who carried Frodo on the way to Mount Doom, to Simon of Cyrene, who carried Christ's cross to Golgotha. Church of St. John Nepomucen, Brenna.

Several commentators have seen Gandalf's passage through the Mines of Moria, dying to save his companions and returning as "Gandalf the White", as a symbol of the resurrection of Christ. Like Jesus who carried his cross for the sins of mankind, Frodo carried a burden of evil on behalf of the whole world. Frodo walks his "Via Dolorosa" to Mount Doom just like Jesus who made his way to Golgotha. As Frodo approaches the Cracks of Doom, the Ring becomes a crushing weight, just as the cross was for Jesus. Sam Gamgee, Frodo's servant, who carries Frodo up to Mount Doom, parallels Simon of Cyrene, who helps Jesus by carrying his cross to Golgotha. When Frodo accomplishes his mission, like Christ, he says "it is done". Just as Christ ascends to heaven, Frodo's life in Middle-earth comes to an end when he departs to the Undying Lands.

=== Hope ===
The motif of hope is illustrated in Aragorn's successful handling of Saruman's seeing-stone or palantír. Aragorn is given the very name of "Hope" (Sindarin "Estel"), by which he is still affectionately called by his queen, Arwen, who at the hour of his death cries out "Estel, Estel!". Only Aragorn, as the heir of Isildur, can rightfully use the palantír, while Saruman and Denethor, who have both also made extensive use of palantírs, have fallen into presumption or despair. These latter traits have been identified as the two distinct sins "against the virtue of Hope".

=== Redemptive suffering ===
A specifically Catholic theme is the redemptive and penitential nature of suffering, apparent in the dreadful ordeal of Sam and Frodo in Mordor. As another example, Boromir atones for his assault on Frodo by single-handedly but vainly defending Merry and Pippin from orcs, which illustrates also another significant Christian theme: immortality of the soul and the importance of good intention, especially at the point of death. This is clear from Gandalf's statement: "But he [Boromir] escaped in the end.... It was not in vain that the young hobbits came with us, if only for Boromir's sake." (Note: Tolkien 1954, Book 3, chapter 5 "The White Rider")

== Language ==
=== True language, true names ===
Shippey writes that The Lord of the Rings embodies Tolkien's belief that "the word authenticates the thing", or to look at it another way, that "fantasy is not entirely made up". Tolkien was a professional philologist, with a deep understanding of language and etymology, the origins of words. He found a resonance with the ancient myth of the "true language", "isomorphic with reality": in that language, each word names a thing and each thing has a true name, and using that name gives the speaker power over that thing. This is seen directly in the character Tom Bombadil, who can name anything, and that name then becomes that thing's name ever after; Shippey notes that this happens with the names he gives to the hobbits' ponies.

This belief, Shippey states, animated Tolkien's insistence on what he considered to be the ancient, traditional, and genuine forms of words. A modern English word like loaf, deriving directly from Old English hlāf, has its plural form in 'v', "loaves", whereas a newcomer like "proof", not from Old English, rightly has its plural the new way, "proofs". So, Tolkien reasoned, the proper plurals of "dwarf" and "elf" must be "dwarves" and "elves", not as the dictionary and the printers typesetting The Lord of the Rings would have them, "dwarfs" and elfs". The same went for forms like "dwarvish" and "elvish", strong and old, and avoiding any hint of dainty little "elfin" flower-fairies. Tolkien insisted on the expensive reversion of all such typographical "corrections" at the galley proof stage.

=== From language to story ===
According to Tom Shippey, Tolkien invented parts of Middle-earth to resolve the linguistic puzzle he had accidentally created by using different European languages for those of peoples in his legendarium.

Tolkien devoted enormous effort to place-names, for example making those in The Shire such as Nobottle, Bucklebury, and Tuckborough obviously English in sound and by etymology. Shippey comments that, although many of these names do not enter the book's plot, they contribute a feeling of reality and depth, giving "Middle-earth that air of solidity and extent both in space and time which its successors [in fantasy literature] so conspicuously lack". Tolkien wrote in one of his letters that his work was "largely an essay in linguistic aesthetic". (Note: Carpenter 2023, #165 to Houghton Mifflin, June 1955)

He made use of several European languages, ancient and modern, including Old English for the language of Rohan and Old Norse for the names of dwarves (initially in The Hobbit), and modern English for the Common Speech, creating as the story developed a tricky linguistic puzzle. Among other things, Middle-earth was not modern Europe but that region long ages ago, and the Common Speech was not modern English but Westron. Therefore, the dialogue and names written in modern English were, in the fiction, translations from the Westron, and the language and placenames of Rohan was similarly supposedly translated from Rohirric into Old English; therefore, too, the dwarf-names written in Old Norse must have been translated from Khuzdul into Old Norse. Thus the linguistic geography of Middle-earth grew from Tolkien's purely philological or linguistic explorations.

=== Language, peoples, and places ===
In addition, Tolkien invested a large amount of time and energy creating languages, especially the Elvish languages of Quenya and Sindarin, both of which appear, sometimes untranslated, in The Lord of the Rings. Tolkien had a private theory on the way that the sounds of a language convey a feeling of beauty; he felt pure pleasure in the vocabulary of the Gothic language, and indeed of Welsh. Shippey explains that, "He thought that people could feel history in words, could recognise language 'styles', could extract sense (of sorts) from sound alone, could moreover make aesthetic judgements based on phonology." Thus Tolkien has Legolas say, on hearing Aragorn singing The Lament of the Rohirrim in Rohirric (the language of Rohan), which Legolas does not understand:

That, I guess, is the language of the Rohirrim, for it is like to this land itself, rich and rolling in part, and else hard and stern as the mountains. But I cannot guess what it means, save that it is laden with the sadness of Mortal Men. (Note: Tolkien 1954, book 3, ch. 6 "The King of the Golden Hall")

Shippey states that Tolkien liked to suppose that there really was such a strong connection between things, people, and language, "especially if the person who spoke the language lived on the thing". He notes that the effect of language appears again and again in The Lord of the Rings, such as when the hobbits hear the Elf Gildor singing and find that the blended sound and melody "seemed to shape itself in their thought"; (Note: Tolkien 1954a, book 1, ch. 3 "Three is Company") when everyone at the Council of Elrond quails at the sound of Gandalf's voicing the Black Speech in Rivendell; (Note: Tolkien 1954a, book 2, ch. 2 "The Council of Elrond·") or when Sam Gamgee responds "I like that!" when the dwarf Gimli sings about the dwarf-King Durin long ago. (Note: Tolkien 1954a, book 2, ch. 4 "A Journey in the Dark")

== Moralisation from landscape ==
Tolkien describes the landscapes of Middle-earth realistically, but at the same time uses descriptions of land and weather to convey feelings and a sense of something beyond the here and now. Shippey states that "both characters and readers become aware of the extent and nature of Tolkien's moralisations from landscape" in the many passages where he ambiguously writes about landscape, such as Frodo's reflections on the Dead Marshes:

They lie in all the pools, pale faces deep deep under the dark water, I saw them: grim faces and evil, and noble faces and sad. Many faces proud and fair, and weeds in their silver hair. But all foul, all rotting, all dead. A fell light is in them. (Note: Tolkien 1954, book 4, ch. 2 "The Passage of the Marshes")

Shippey writes that Tolkien frequently comes close to what the critic John Ruskin called the pathetic fallacy, the idea that things in nature can express human emotion and conduct. However, he states, the literary theorist Northrop Frye more accurately named the function of such passages as hinting at higher literary modes. In his Anatomy of Criticism, Frye classified literature as ranging from "Ironic" at the lowest, via "Low Mimetic" (such as humorous descriptions), "High Mimetic" (accurate descriptions), and "Romantic" (idealised accounts) to "Mythic" as the highest mode; and modern literature is generally at a lower level than literature of past centuries. In Shippey's view, most of The Lord of the Rings is in Romantic mode, with occasional touches of myth, and moments of high and low mimesis to relieve the mood; and Tolkien's ability to present multiple modes at once is a major reason for his success.

== Debated themes ==
The Lord of the Rings has repeatedly been attacked, as scholars such as Ralph Wood write, on the grounds that it is a story about men for boys, with no significant women, that it omits religion from its societies, and that it appears to be racist. Against this, scholars have noted that women do play significant roles, that the book carries a Christian message, and that Tolkien was consistently anti-racist in his private correspondence. Tolkien fan fiction has responded to these themes; as Karen Viars and Cait Coker write, fans have "unsurprisingly focused on many of those topics Tolkien scholars are fond of today—homosexual overtones..., racism..., Tolkien's literary sources and forebears, and the roles of women in his world."

=== Lack of female characters ===
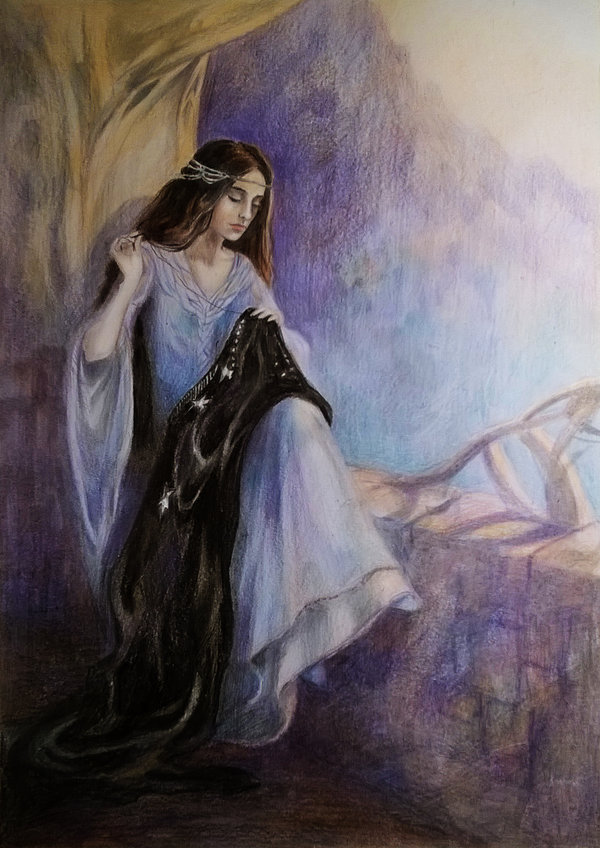
Some commentators have accused Tolkien of placing women only in background roles while the male protagonists see all the action. Arwen sewing Aragorn's standard, by Anna Kulisz, 2015.

The first accusation is that there are no significant female characters; or that there are few; or that their roles are tightly constrained. Against this, Wood writes that Galadriel, Éowyn, and Arwen are far from being "plaster figures": Galadriel is powerful, wise and "terrible in her beauty"; Éowyn has "extraordinary courage and valor"; and Arwen gives up her Elvish immortality to marry Aragorn. Further, Wood argues, Tolkien insists that everyone, man and woman alike, face the same kinds of temptation, hope, and desire. Ann Basso argues in Mythlore that the female characters, including figures like Goldberry, are "diverse, well drawn, and worthy of respect", while Katherine Hasser argues in the J. R. R. Tolkien Encyclopedia that gender roles in the Shire are not sharply separated, as males like Bilbo carry out domestic duties such as cooking and cleaning.

=== Lack of religion ===
Wood notes that the work contains no formal religion. Hobbits have no temples or sacrifices, though Frodo can call to Elbereth, one of the Valar, in extremis; the nearest anyone comes to religion is that the men of Gondor "pause before meals". Wood's answer here is that Tolkien intentionally left religion out of Middle-earth so that "we might see Christianity reflected in it more clearly if also indirectly". He quotes Tolkien's remark in a letter that "the religious element is absorbed into the story and the symbolism". (Note: Carpenter 2023, letter #142 to Robert Murray S.J., 2 December 1953)

=== Racism ===
Tolkien has frequently been accused of racism; however, during the Second World War, he consistently expressed an anti-racist position.

Sandra Ballif Straubhaar writes that far from being racist, "a polycultured, polylingual world is absolutely central" to Middle-earth, and that readers and filmgoers will easily see that. She notes that the "recurring accusations in the popular media" of a racist view of the story are "interesting". Straubhaar quotes the Swedish cultural studies scholar David Tjeder who described Gollum's account of the men of Harad ("Not nice; very cruel wicked Men they look. Almost as bad as Orcs, and much bigger." (Note: Tolkien 1954, book 4, ch. 3 "The Black Gate is Closed")) in Aftonbladet as "stereotypical and reflective of colonial attitudes". She argues instead that Gollum's view, with its "arbitrary and stereotypical assumptions about the 'Other'", is absurd, and that Gollum cannot be taken as an authority on Tolkien's opinion. Straubhaar contrasts this with Sam Gamgee's more humane response to the sight of a dead Harad warrior, which she finds "harder to find fault with":

He was glad that he could not see the dead face. He wondered what the man's name was and where he came from; and if he was really evil of heart, or what lies or threats had led him on the long march from his home. (Note: Tolkien 1954, book 4, ch. 4 "Of Herbs and Stewed Rabbit")

Straubhaar quotes the English scholar Stephen Shapiro, who wrote in The Scotsman that

Put simply, Tolkien's good guys are white and the bad guys are black, slant-eyed, unattractive, inarticulate, and a psychologically undeveloped horde.

Straubhaar concedes that Shapiro may have had a point with "slant-eyed", but comments that this was milder than that of many of his contemporary novelists such as John Buchan, and notes that Tolkien had in fact made "appalled objection" when people had misapplied his story to current events. She similarly observes that Tjeder had failed to notice Tolkien's "concerted effort" to change the Western European "paradigm" that speakers of supposedly superior languages were "ethnically superior".

=== Sexuality ===
The presence of sexuality in The Lord of the Rings has been debated, as it is somewhat unobtrusive. However, love and marriage appear in the form of the warm relationship between the hobbits Sam Gamgee and Rosie Cotton; the unreturned feelings of Éowyn for Aragorn, followed by her falling in love with Faramir, and marrying him; and Aragorn's love for Arwen, described in an appendix rather than in the main text, as "The Tale of Aragorn and Arwen". Multiple scholars have commented on the novel's depiction of sexuality, or the lack of it. Interest has been concentrated, too, on the officer-batman-inspired same-sex relationship of Frodo and his gardener Sam as they travel together on the dangerous quest to destroy the Ring. Scholars and commentators have interpreted the relationship in different ways, from close but not necessarily homosexual to plainly homoerotic, or as an idealised heroic friendship.

== See also ==
- Influences on Tolkien

== Sources ==
- Carpenter, Humphrey, ed. (2023) [1981]. The Letters of J. R. R. Tolkien: Revised and Expanded Edition. New York: HarperCollins. ISBN 978-0-35-865298-4.
- Nitzsche, Jane Chance (1980) [1979]. Tolkien's Art: 'A Mythology for England'. Papermac. ISBN 978-0-333-29034-7.
- Shippey, Tom (2002). J.R.R. Tolkien: Author of the Century. HarperCollins. ISBN 978-0-26110-401-3.
- Shippey, Tom (2005) [1982]. The Road to Middle-Earth: How J. R. R. Tolkien Created a New Mythology (Third ed.). HarperCollins. ISBN 978-0-261-10275-0.
- Solopova, Elizabeth (2009). Languages, Myths and History: An Introduction to the Linguistic and Literary Background of J. R. R. Tolkien's Fiction. New York City: North Landing Books. ISBN 978-0-9816607-1-4.
- Straubhaar, Sandra Ballif (2004). "Myth, Late Roman History, and Multiculturalism in Tolkien's Middle-Earth". In Chance, Jane (ed.). Tolkien and the invention of myth : a reader. University Press of Kentucky. pp. 101–117. ISBN 978-0-81312-301-1.
- Tolkien, J. R. R. (1954a). The Fellowship of the Ring. The Lord of the Rings. Boston: Houghton Mifflin. OCLC 9552942.
- Tolkien, J. R. R. (1954). The Two Towers. The Lord of the Rings. Boston: Houghton Mifflin. OCLC 1042159111.
