= The Lord of the Rings (1981 radio series) =

Radio dramatisation of book

- BBC Radio Collection cover
- Genre: Radio drama
- Running time: 30 minutes per episode
- Country of origin: United Kingdom
- Language: English
- Home station: BBC Radio 4
- Starring: Ian Holm; Michael Hordern; Robert Stephens; Bill Nighy; James Grout; Simon Cadell; John Le Mesurier; Jack May; Peter Vaughan
- Created by: J. R. R. Tolkien
- Written by: Brian Sibley; Michael Bakewell
- Directed by: Jane Morgan; Penny Leicester
- Narrated by: Gerard Murphy
- Original release: 8 March – 30 August 1981
- No. of episodes: 26

The Lord of the Rings 1981 radio series is an epic fantasy adventure for BBC Radio 4, adapted from J. R. R. Tolkien's 1955 novel of the same name. It is the third radio dramatisation of the novel, following a 1955 BBC Radio adaptation and a 1979 adaptation for NPR in the United States.

Like the novel on which it is based, the radio series tells the story of an epic struggle between the Dark Lord Sauron of Mordor, the primary villain of the work, and an alliance of heroes who join forces to save the world from falling under his shadow.

== Development ==
=== Early stages and commissioning ===
The BBC entered negotiations with The Saul Zaentz Company to obtain the radio rights to adapt The Lord of the Rings in 1979, following the release of the Ralph Bakshi animated film. J. R. R. Tolkien had sold the film, stage and merchandising rights to United Artists in 1969, who had subsequently sold them to The Saul Zaentz Company in 1976. The negotiations were protracted but ironically entirely unnecessary as the radio rights had never passed to the film company and were still controlled by the Tolkien estate.

Brian Sibley was a young scriptwriter who had written a number of radio features for the BBC, but lacked experience adapting works of literature, having previously only adapted a short fantasy by James Thurber. In 1979, Sibley submitted an idea for an original radio drama to Head of Drama Script Unit, Richard Imison, but was rejected. In his rejection letter, Imison asked Sibley to suggest a list of novels he would like to see adapted. Sibley submitted “about a baker’s dozen” suggestions, and added The Lord of the Rings in a postscript, declaring it “the one book I would really like to adapt for radio.” Some weeks later in a chance meeting on a corridor in Broadcasting House, Imison asked Sibley how he had learnt that the BBC were in negotiations to obtain the rights. Sibley stated that he had not been aware, and had suggested the book because he was "simply in love with [it]", having read it for the first time during an extended hospital stay a few years earlier. The BBC commissioned the adaptation and offered it to Sibley as the lead writer. The commissioners had determined that it should comprise 26 half-hour episodes (6 months' worth of weekly broadcasts), and that scriptwriting should be divided between two writers. Michael Bakewell was brought in as the second writer – a former producer and writer whose previous credits included a radio adaptation of Tolstoy’s War and Peace.

=== Writing ===
Sibley and Bakewell began the process of adapting the books by arranging the core storyline into 26 episode synopses, each with its own conventional narrative structure and ending on a natural ‘cliffhanger’. From these synopses, the full episode scripts would be developed. The source material presented a variety of challenges to the adaptation process. Sibley recalls pacing difficulties due to the book's fluctuations between "sections rich in description, others containing lengthy historical resumés, some having an abundance of dialogue, while others are almost entirely narrative." These challenges led to decisions to omit sections and characters that were deemed not to meaningfully advance the core plot. As such, the serial omits several sequences, most notably those in Book 1 in which the hobbits come to Crickhollow, enter the Old Forest, and encounter the Barrow-wights, Old Man Willow, and ultimately Tom Bombadil. On the latter, Sibley has stated he considers Bombadil to be a character Tolkien created independently of The Lord of the Rings, and that it was preferable to "excise one large episode than to dramatically reduce several others." On the decision to excise some minor characters who appeared for only a few lines of the book, Sibley stated he felt it preferable to remove the character altogether than the alternative, "which would have been to fabricate dialogue for them." The adaptation radically restructured the chronology of the chapters in Books 3-6, flattening out Tolkien's interlacing by splicing the journey of Frodo and Sam with events in the West. This aligned them with the timeline of events provided by Tolkien in the Appendices, and kept more of the actors employed for more of the episodes.

The script attempts to be as faithful as possible to the original novel with many sections of dialogue lifted directly from the source material, such as the conversations between Frodo, Sam and Faramir in “The Window on the West”. The script includes an arc where Wormtongue is waylaid by the Ringwraiths, as narrated in Unfinished Tales, a newly published volume at that time. The final episode uses “Bilbo's Last Song”, a Tolkien poem that does not appear in the novel, to flesh out the sequence at the Grey Havens. The author's son and editor Christopher Tolkien reviewed and approved the final scripts for each episode. He recorded an audio cassette of correct pronunciations for Middle-earth words and names to assist the cast during recordings.

== Recording ==
Recording took place at BBC Broadcasting House over two months in 1980. One-and-a-half days was allotted for each of the 26 episodes to be rehearsed and recorded. Sibley recalls the recording sessions having "quite a lot of laughter, quite a few tears, and a number of frazzled tempers". Gandalf actor Michael Hordern recalled the sessions as "a bit of a slog".

Elizabeth Parker of the BBC Radiophonic Workshop produced the sound effects. The composer Stephen Oliver, who had previously scored the RSC's successful production of Nicholas Nickleby, scored the music, with over 100 cues through the original 26-episode serial. The series was directed by Jane Morgan and Penny Leicester. Morgan stated she was anxious to avoid sound effects that were "too literal", and wished to incorporate music in complex battle scenes.

== Episodes ==
Episode	Title	First broadcast	Covering (Book.Chapter) The Lord of the Rings
1	The Long Awaited Party	8 March 1981	1.1 The hobbit protagonists are introduced.
2	The Shadow of the Past	15 March 1981	1.2 The wizard Gandalf tells Frodo the history of the Ring, and why it must be destroyed.
3	The Black Riders	22 March 1981	1.3 * The hobbits are pursued by deadly Black Riders.
4	Trouble at The Prancing Pony	29 March 1981	1.9–1.10 The hobbits try to rest in an inn, but Frodo 'accidentally' puts on the Ring, making him invisible.
5	The Knife in the Dark	5 April 1981	1.11–1.12 Frodo is stabbed with a magic knife by a Black Rider. He starts to fade.
6	The Council of Elrond	12 April 1981	2.1–2.2 The half-elven Elrond calls a Council to decide the fate of the Ring.
7	The Fellowship of the Ring	19 April 1981	2.3 Gandalf, the hobbits, two men – Aragorn and Boromir, an elf, Legolas, and a dwarf, Gimli, set out to destroy the Ring.
8	The Mines of Moria	26 April 1981	2.4–2.5 They try to cross the Misty Mountains through the tunnels of Moria. Gandalf dies fighting a monstrous Balrog.
9	The Mirror of Galadriel	3 May 1981	2.6–2.7 The rest of the Fellowship are helped, tested, and counselled by the elf-lady Galadriel.
10	The Breaking of the Fellowship	10 May 1981	2.8–2.10, 3.1 The Fellowship breaks up as Boromir tries to take the Ring and is killed.
11	The Riders of Rohan	17 May 1981	3.2–3.3 Aragorn, Legolas, and Gimli meet a resurrected Gandalf and the Riders of Rohan.
12	Treebeard of Fangorn	24 May 1981	3.4 Two of the hobbits, Merry and Pippin, encounter a tree-giant, Treebeard.
13	The King of the Golden Hall	31 May 1981	3.5–3.6 Gandalf frees Théoden, King of Rohan, free from a spell.
14	Helm's Deep	7 June 1981	3.7 Théoden fights off the wizard Saruman's army at the fortress of Helm's Deep.
15	The Voice of Saruman	14 June 1981	3.8–3.11 Gandalf and Théoden go to Saruman's tower, Orthanc, and speak with him. Gandalf breaks Saruman's staff.
16	The Black Gate Is Closed	21 June 1981	4.1–4.3 The other two hobbits, Frodo and Sam, guided by the monstrous Gollum, travel to Mordor to destroy the Ring, but the Black Gate is shut.
17	The Window on the West	28 June 1981	4.4–4.6 Frodo and Sam travel south to find another way into Mordor, but are captured by Boromir's brother, Faramir.
18	Minas Tirith	5 July 1981	5.1 Gandalf and Pippin find the city of Minas Tirith preparing for war.
19	Shelob's Lair	12 July 1981	4.7–4.10 Frodo and Sam try to cross the pass of Cirith Ungol into Mordor, but are attacked by the giant spider Shelob. Frodo is stung and trussed up like a fly.
20	The Siege of Gondor	19 July 1981	5.4 Minas Tirith is besieged by the forces of Mordor.
21	The Battle of Pelennor Fields	26 July 1981	5.6 Minas Tirith is attacked by an immense army. The Riders of Rohan arrive to break the siege; Aragorn and an army of Gondor arrive by ship.
22	The Houses of Healing	2 August 1981	5.8 The wounded are healed in Minas Tirith.
23	Mount Doom	9 August 1981	6.1–6.3 Frodo and Sam travel to Mount Doom to destroy the Ring. Gollum takes the ring from Frodo, and falls into the mountain's fire.
24	The Return of the King	16 August 1981	6.4–6.5 Aragorn becomes King of Gondor, and marries Elrond's daughter, Arwen.
25	Homeward Bound	23 August 1981	6.6–6.8 The hobbits travel home.
26	The Grey Havens	30 August 1981	6.9 Frodo, scarred by his journey, sails from Middle-earth to elvenhome.

*1.4–1.8 on Crickhollow, Fatty Bolger, the Old Forest, Barrow-wights and Tom Bombadil omitted

== Broadcasts and release ==
The serial was first broadcast from 8 March to 30 August 1981 on BBC Radio 4 on Sundays from 12 noon to 12:30pm; each episode was repeated on the following Wednesday from 10:30pm to 11:00pm. A soundtrack album featuring a re-recorded and in some cases expanded suite of Stephen Oliver's music was released in 1981.

The 26-part series was edited into 13 hour-long episodes broadcast from 17 July to 9 October 1982, restoring some dialogue originally cut for timing. Following the success of Peter Jackson's The Lord of the Rings film trilogy in the early 2000s, the BBC reissued its radio series in three sets (audiobooks) corresponding to the three original volumes (The Fellowship of the Ring, The Two Towers and The Return of the King). This version omitted the original episode divisions, and included new opening and closing monologues for the first two sets, and an opening monologue only for the last, written by Sibley and performed by Ian Holm as Frodo Baggins. The soundtrack with Stephen Oliver's music, digitally remastered, was included with The Return of the King set, with a demo of John Le Mesurier singing Bilbo's Last Song as a bonus track.

On July 22, 2026, Brian Sibley announced on his Facebook page that Demon Music Group would release a vinyl and CD editions of the 1981 BBC Radio adaptation of The Lord of the Rings on December 4, 2026. The release will feature the serial in its original 26-episode, 30-minute broadcast format. Demon Music Group’s website lists vinyl and CD editions for release.

== Analysis ==
The scriptwriter Brian Sibley found the performances of three of the leading actors particularly excellent, namely Ian Holm as Frodo, Michael Hordern as Gandalf, and John Le Mesurier as Bilbo (all three actors pictured during the production).

Sibley thought the casting of Ian Holm as Frodo "simply inspired", his performance "of unswerving determination, tempered always with humour and vulnerability." He felt that Hordern managed to "become" Gandalf, "by intuition or some other theatrical magic ... by turn wise, stern and compassionate, a force for good, a constant light in an ever-darkening storm." As for John Le Mesurier's Bilbo, the comic actor who had played Sergeant Wilson in Dad's Army gave the part "a weary melancholy".

The scholar of humanities Brian Rosebury sets out criteria for adapting a complex work like The Lord of the Rings. The adaptation, he writes, must not simply use characters and names to relabel some existing formula, or rewrite the story into a generic style; it must retain as much as possible of the original when translating the narrative into a drama; it must keep the presentation fresh, avoid repetition, and retain plausibility; and it must especially retain the coherent feeling of a Middle-earth under threat, along with the book's momentum, coherence, moral conviction, and subtlety. Rosebury states that a radio production is "fundamentally hampered" by not being able to "suggest the physical and cultural presence of Middle-earth", other than through the limited medium of sound effects. In his view, the few passages of narration in the production "give tantalising glimpses of [Tolkien's] breadth of vision which fades painfully as the studio-bound dialogues resume." He finds the dialogue well delivered by the actors, admiring especially Peter Woodthorpe's "fine Gollum", and the abridgement skilful though subtly flattening Tolkien's text "in the direction of an adventure story." The version's strength, Rosebury writes, is in its rather faithful and almost complete rendering of the book's events, though as in Ralph Bakshi's animated version and Peter Jackson's live-action version, without Tom Bombadil.

The Tolkien scholar Christina Scull thought it a "masterly adaptation", that stayed faithful to Tolkien's story, presented most of the characters "as he depicted them", and especially "caught the spirit of the books". She found the handling of the Battle of the Pelennor Fields with alliterative verse "a brilliant idea", and praised Gerard Murphy's narration. Comparing the production with Jackson's interpretation, she felt that her "happiness with the BBC production made [her] even less happy with Jackson than I might have been without it", disliking the films' additional material, violence, and "the weakening of almost all the characters". In her view, the BBC dramatisation presented "the characters I [met] in the book", whereas the film version did not.

Peter Woodthorpe (Gollum/Sméagol) and Michael Graham Cox (Boromir) had previously voiced the same roles in Bakshi's film in 1978. Ian Holm, who voiced Frodo Baggins in the radio serial, went on to play Bilbo Baggins in Jackson's film trilogy in the early 2000s.

== Cast and credits ==
The Lord of the Rings was dramatised for radio by Sibley and Michael Bakewell. The music was composed by Stephen Oliver. Radiophonic sound was provided by Elizabeth Parker. The series was produced and directed by Jane Morgan and Penny Leicester.

The cast for the production was:

- Narrator (UK version): Gerard Murphy
- Narrator (American version): Tammy Grimes
- Frodo Baggins: Ian Holm
- Gandalf the Grey/Gandalf the White: Michael Hordern
- Aragorn (Strider): Robert Stephens
- Sam Gamgee: Bill Nighy (credited as William Nighy)
- Meriadoc Brandybuck (Merry): Richard O'Callaghan
- Peregrin Took (Pippin): John McAndrew
- Legolas: David Collings
- Gimli: Douglas Livingstone
- Boromir: Michael Graham Cox
- Galadriel: Marian Diamond
- Celeborn: Simon Cadell
- Arwen Evenstar: Sonia Fraser
- Saruman the White: Peter Howell
- Elrond: Hugh Dickson
- Bilbo Baggins: John Le Mesurier
- Gollum/Sméagol: Peter Woodthorpe
- Théoden: Jack May
- Gríma Wormtongue: Paul Brooke
- Éowyn: Elin Jenkins
- Éomer: Anthony Hyde
- Faramir: Andrew Seear
- Treebeard: Stephen Thorne
- Denethor: Peter Vaughan
- Lord of the Nazgûl: Philip Voss
- The Mouth of Sauron: John Rye
- Glorfindel/An Elf lord of the house of Elrond half-elven: John Webb
- Haldir/Nazgûl/Nob/Minstrel: Haydn Wood
- Gamling: Patrick Barr
- Ceorl: Michael McStay
- Háma/A Nazgûl: Michael Spice
- Éothain/Otho Sackville-Baggins/Ruffian: John Livesey
- Halbarad: Martyn Read
- Beregond/The Black Rider/Guard: Christopher Scott
- Ioreth: Pauline Letts
- Gwaihir: Alexander John
- Radagast the Brown: Donald Gee
- Gaffer Gamgee: John Church
- Ted Sandyman/Snaga: Gordon Reid
- Rosie Cotton: Kathryn Hurlbutt
- Daddy Twofoot: Leonard Fenton
- Farmer Maggot/Ruffian: John Bott
- Lobelia Sackville-Baggins: Diana Bishop
- Farmer Cotton: Alan Dudley
- Proudfoot/Orc: Sean Arnold
- Elanor Gamgee: Harry Holm
- Barliman Butterbur: James Grout
- Uglúk: Brian Haines
- Shagrat: Christopher Fairbank
- Gorbag: David Sinclair
- Déagol/Bill Ferny/Orc Captain: Graham Faulkner
- Shelob: Jenny Lee, BBC Radiophonic Workshop
- Singer (Dream Voice/Bilbo's Last Song): Matthew Vine
- Singer (The Bard): Oz Clarke
- Singer (The Eagle/Voice of Lothlórien): David James

== See also ==
- The Lord of the Rings (1955 radio series)
- The Lord of the Rings (1979 radio series)
