= Palantír =

Fictional magical artefact

- The Lord of the Rings element
- First appearance: The Fellowship of the Ring; 1954
- Created by: J. R. R. Tolkien
- Genre: Fantasy

In-universe information
- Type: Crystal ball
- Function: Scrying; Telepathic communication
- Traits and abilities: Indestructible sphere of dark crystal

A palantír ([paˈlanˌtiːr]; in-universe pl. palantíri) is one of several indestructible crystal balls from J. R. R. Tolkien's epic-fantasy novel The Lord of the Rings. The word comes from Quenya palan 'far', and tir 'watch over'. (Note: Tolkien 1987 The Lost Road and Other Writings, part 3, "Etymologies" s.v. PAL, TIR. Tar-Palantir was the name of the 24th ruler of Númenor, so named for being 'far-sighted'.) The stones were used for communication and to see events in other parts of Arda, or in the past.

The palantírs were made by the Elves of Valinor in the First Age, as told in The Silmarillion. By the time of The Lord of the Rings at the end of the Third Age, a few palantíri remained in use in Middle-Earth. They are used at pivotal moments by major characters: Sauron, Saruman, Denethor the Steward of Gondor, and two members of the Company of the Ring: Aragorn and Pippin.

A major theme of palantír usage is that while the stones show real objects or events, those using the stones had to "possess great strength of will and of mind" to direct the stone's gaze to its full capability. (Note: Tolkien 1977 The Silmarillion, "Of the Rings of Power and the Third Age") The stones were an unreliable guide to action, since what was not shown could be more important than what was selectively presented. A risk lay in the fact that users with sufficient power could choose what to show and what to conceal to other stones: in The Lord of the Rings, a palantír has fallen into the Enemy's hands, making the usefulness of all other existing stones questionable.

Commentators such as the Tolkien scholar Paul Kocher note the hand of providence in their usage, while Joseph Pearce compares Sauron's use of the stones to broadcast wartime propaganda. Tom Shippey suggests that the message is that "speculation", looking into any sort of magic mirror (Latin: speculum) or stone to see the future, rather than trusting in providence, leads to error.

== Fictional artefact ==
=== Origins ===
In Tolkien's fantasy The Lord of the Rings, the palantírs were made by the Elves of Valinor in the Uttermost West, by the Noldor, apparently by Fëanor himself from silima, "that which shines". The number that he made is not stated, but there were at least eight of them. Seven of the stones given to Amandil of Númenor during the Second Age were saved by his son Elendil; he took them with him to Middle-earth, while at least the Master-stone remained behind.

Four were taken to Gondor, while three stayed in Arnor. Originally, the stones of Arnor were at Elostirion in the Tower Hills, Amon Sul (Weathertop), and Annuminas: the Elostirion stone, Elendil's own, looked only Westwards from Middle-earth across the ocean to the Master-stone at the Tower of Avallonë upon Eressëa, an island off Valinor. The stones of Gondor were in Orthanc, Minas Tirith, Osgiliath, and Minas Ithil.

By the time of The Lord of the Rings, the stone of Orthanc was in the hands of the wizard Saruman, while the stone of Minas Ithil (by then Minas Morgul, the city of the Nazgûl) had been taken by the Dark Lord Sauron. That of Minas Tirith remained in the hands of the Steward of Gondor, Denethor. The stone of Osgiliath had been lost in the Anduin when the city was sacked. (Note: Tolkien 1980 Unfinished Tales, part 4, 3. "The palantíri") Gandalf names two of these as the Orthanc-stone and the Ithil-stone. (Note: Tolkien 1954 The Two Towers, book 3, ch. 11 "The Palantír")

=== Characteristics ===
A single palantír enabled its user to see places far off, or events in the past. A person could look into a palantír to communicate with anyone looking into another palantír. They could then see "visions of the things in the mind" of the person looking into the other stone.

The stones were made of a dark crystal, indestructible by any normal means, except perhaps the fire of Orodruin. They ranged in size from a diameter of about a foot (30 cm) to much larger stones that could not be lifted by one person. The Stone of Osgiliath had power over other stones including the ability to eavesdrop. The minor stones required the user to move around them, thereby changing the viewpoint of its vision, whereas the major stones could be turned on their axis.

Tom Shippey's analysis of uses of palantírs, with consistently unpredictable effects
Viewer	Image	Presenter	Incorrect assumption	Actually	Result, deceived
The Dark Lord Sauron	Pippin, a hobbit	Pippin, foolishly	Pippin is "the halfling", and has the One Ring; Saruman has captured it	Another halfling, Frodo, has the Ring	Sends Nazgûl to Orthanc, does not watch Ithilien
The Steward of Gondor Denethor	Sauron's armed might, fleet of Corsairs of Umbar approaching Gondor	Sauron, selectively	Fleet is the enemy; victory in battle impossible	Aragorn has captured the fleet	Commits suicide
Sauron	Elendil's heir (Aragorn) with Elendil's sword	Aragorn, boldly	Aragorn now has the Ring, will soon attack Mordor	The Ring is on its way to Mordor	Attacks Gondor prematurely; fails to guard Cirith Ungol or to watch Mordor

== Analysis ==
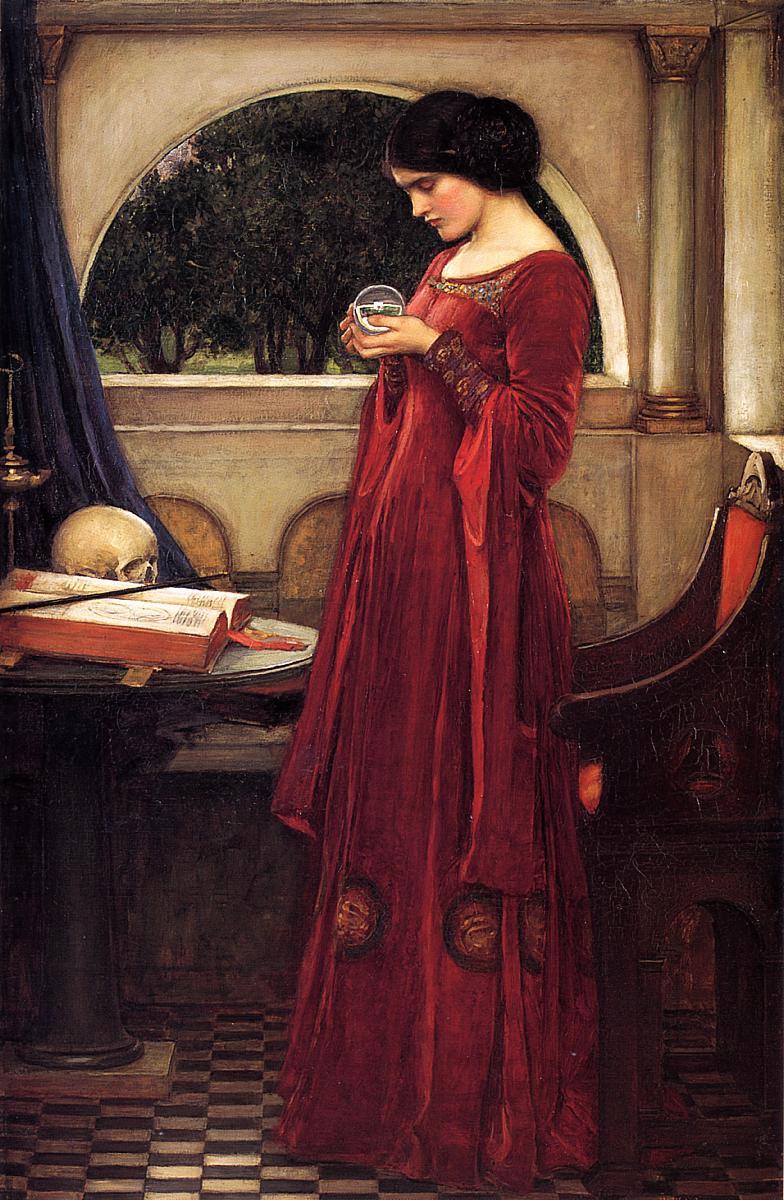
Tom Shippey suggests that the palantírs' deception says one should trust in providence, not crystal balls. Painting by J.W. Waterhouse, 1902

A wielder of great power such as Sauron could dominate a weaker user through the stone, which was the experience of Pippin Took and Saruman. Even one as powerful as Sauron could not make the palantíri "lie", or create false images; the most he could do was to selectively display truthful images to create a false impression in the viewer's mind. In The Lord of the Rings, three such uses of the stones are described, and in each case, a true image is shown, but the viewer draws a false conclusion from the facts. This applies to Sauron when he sees Pippin in Saruman's stone and assumes that Pippin has the One Ring, and that Saruman has therefore captured it. Denethor, too, is deceived through his use of a palantír, this time by Sauron, who drives Denethor to suicide by truthfully showing him the Black Fleet approaching Gondor, without telling him that the ships are crewed by Aragorn's troops, coming to Gondor's rescue. Shippey suggests that this consistent pattern is Tolkien's way of telling the reader that one should not "speculate" – the word meaning both to try to double-guess the future, and to look into a mirror (Latin: speculum 'glass or mirror') or crystal ball – but should trust in one's luck and make one's own mind up, courageously facing one's duty in each situation.

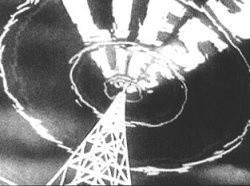
Joseph Pearce compared Sauron's use of Palantírs to spread despair to wartime use of radio for propaganda. Screenshot from Frank Capra's wartime Why We Fight

The English literature scholar Paul Kocher similarly noted the hand of providence: Wormtongue's throwing of the stone providentially leads to Pippin's foolish look into the stone, which deceives Sauron; and it allows Aragorn to claim the stone and use it to deceive Sauron further. This leads him to assume that Aragorn has the One Ring. That in turn provokes Sauron into a whole series of what turn out to be disastrous actions: a premature attack on Minas Tirith; a rushed exit of the army of Minas Morgul, thus letting the hobbits through the pass of Cirith Ungol with the One Ring, and so on until the quest to destroy the ring succeeds against all odds.

The Tolkien scholar Jane Chance writes that Saruman's sin, in Christian terms, is to seek Godlike knowledge by gazing in a short-sighted way into the Orthanc palantír in the hope of rivalling Sauron. She quotes Tolkien's description in The Two Towers, which states that Saruman explored "all those arts and subtle devices, for which he forsook his former wisdom". She explains that he is in this way giving up actual wisdom for "mere knowledge", imagining the arts were his own but in fact coming from Sauron. This prideful self-aggrandisement leads to his fall. She notes that it is ironic in this context that palantír means "far-sighted".

Joseph Pearce compares Sauron's use of the seeing stones to "broadcast propaganda and sow the seeds of despair among his enemies" with the communications technologies used to spread propaganda in the Second World War and then the Cold War, when Tolkien was writing.

== In film ==
In Peter Jackson's The Two Towers, Saruman uses the Orthanc Palantír, the camera giving an overview as shown, and then zooming in, like a Palantír itself, providing the viewer with an omniscient picture of the whole of Middle-earth.

A palantír appears in the film director Peter Jackson's The Lord of the Rings films. The Tolkien critic Allison Harl compares Jackson to Saruman, and his camera to a palantír, writing that "Jackson chooses to look through the perilous lens, putting his camera to use to exert control over the [original Tolkien] text." Harl cites Laura Mulvey's essay "Visual Pleasure and the Narrative Cinema" which describes "scopophilia", the voyeuristic pleasure of looking, based on Sigmund Freud's writings on sexuality. Harl gives as an example the sequence in The Two Towers where Jackson's camera "like the Evil Eye of Sauron" travels towards Saruman's tower, Isengard and "zooms into the dangerous palantír", in her opinion giving the cinema viewer "an omniscient and privileged perspective" consisting of a Sauron-like power to observe the whole of Middle-earth. The sequence ends fittingly, in her opinion, with Mordor and the Eye of Sauron, bringing the viewer, like Saruman, to meet the Enemy's gaze. As a consequence of Jackson's exclusion of The Scouring of the Shire, Saruman is killed by Wormtongue much earlier (at the beginning of the extended edition of The Return of the King), while Gandalf acquires the Orthanc palantír after Pippin retrieves it from Saruman's corpse, instead of having Wormtongue throw it from a window of the tower. Further, Sauron uses the Palantír to show Aragorn a dying Arwen, (a scene from the future) in the hope of weakening his resolve.

== See also ==
- Alatyr (mythology)
- Remote viewing

== Sources ==
- Chance, Jane (1980) [1979]. Tolkien's Art: 'A Mythology for England'. Papermac. ISBN 978-0333290347.
- Croft, Janet Brennan (2011). "Jackson's Aragorn and the American Superhero". In Bogstad, Janice M.; Kaveny, Philip E. (eds.). Picturing Tolkien. McFarland. ISBN 978-0-7864-8473-7.
- Dunsire, Brin (1979). "The Specula of Middle-earth". Mallorn (13): 16–20.
- Fisher, Jason (2013) [2006]. "palantírs". In Drout, Michael D. C. (ed.). J.R.R. Tolkien Encyclopedia: Scholarship and Critical Assessment. Routledge. ISBN 978-1135880347.
- Harl, Allison (2007). "The Monstrosity of the Gaze: Critical Problems with a Film Adaptation of "The Lord of the Rings"". Mythlore. 25 (3/4 (Spring/Summer 2007)): 61–69. JSTOR 26814608.
- Kocher, Paul (1974) [1972]. Master of Middle-earth: The Achievement of J.R.R. Tolkien. Penguin Books. ISBN 978-0140038774.
- Mulvey, Laura (2001). "Visual Pleasure and Narrative Cinema". In Leitch, Vincent B. (ed.). The Norton Anthology of Theory and Criticism (PDF). W. W. Norton & Company. pp. 57–68.
- Pearce, Joseph (2014). Catholic Literary Giants: A Field Guide to the Catholic Literary Landscape. Ignatius Press. ISBN 978-1-68149-074-8.
- Shippey, Tom (2005) [1982]. The Road to Middle-Earth: How J. R. R. Tolkien Created a New Mythology (Third ed.). HarperCollins. ISBN 978-0-261-10275-0.
- Shippey, Tom (2016). "The Curious Case of Denethor and the Palantír, Once More". Mallorn (57): 6–9.
- Tolkien, J. R. R. (1954). The Two Towers. The Lord of the Rings. Boston: Houghton Mifflin. OCLC 1042159111.
- Tolkien, J. R. R. (1977). Christopher Tolkien (ed.). The Silmarillion. Boston: Houghton Mifflin. ISBN 978-0-395-25730-2.
- Tolkien, J. R. R. (1980). Christopher Tolkien (ed.). Unfinished Tales. Boston: Houghton Mifflin. ISBN 978-0-395-29917-3.
- Tolkien, J. R. R. (1987). Christopher Tolkien (ed.). The Lost Road and Other Writings. Boston: Houghton Mifflin. ISBN 0-395-45519-7.
