= Anke Eißmann =

German illustrator

- Born: Anke Katrin Eißmann; 1977 (age 48–49); Dillenburg, Germany
- Education: Bauhaus University; Colchester Institute
- Known for: graphic design, illustration
- Website: anke.edoras-art.de

Anke Katrin Eißmann (born 1977 in Dillenburg) is a German illustrator and graphic designer known for her illustrations of J. R. R. Tolkien's legendarium. She studied visual communication at Bauhaus University in Weimar and at the Colchester Institute in the United Kingdom. Eißmann has also made a number of short films. She is an art teacher at the Johanneum high school in Herborn.

== Works ==
Eißmann's early inspiration was drawn from works by J. R. R. Tolkien, such as The Silmarillion and The Lord of the Rings. In a 2009 interview she stated that her first encounter with Tolkien's theme was watching Ralph Bakshi's animated film version of Lord of the Rings in 1991. This inspired her to read the novel and initially made her draw illustrations. While studying in Weimar, she began to publish her illustrations on the Internet, which brought her feedback by such artists as Ted Nasmith. As stated on her homepage, Eißmann was also influenced by: "the Pre-Raphaelites, book-illustrators like Arthur Rackham, Edmond Dulac, Ivan Bilibin and Alan Lee, Art Nouveau, artists like Edward Hopper and Jan Vermeer". She has contributed for several years to the annual Beyond Bree Tolkien Calendar.

Apart from Tolkien themes, a lot of Eißmann's work is focused on mythological and historical themes. Other inspirations include the BBC television series Sherlock.

=== Illustrations ===
Works illustrated by Eißmann include:

- The Rejected Quarterly (Winter/spring 2004), a literary magazine sold in universities at the west coast of the United States, focusing on fictional works rejected by other publishers.
- Peter, Johann (2005). Consommé Althusius. Gedichte für Herborn (in German). Geschichtsverein Herborn. ISBN 978-3-9809981-3-0.
- Servos, Stefan; Anja Arendt (2004). Troja - Die Helden der Antike (in German). Heel. ISBN 978-3-89880-320-5.
- Servos, Stefan; Anja Arendt (2004). Space View Special Helden der Antike: Alexander (in German). Heel. ISBN 978-3-89880-397-7.
- "Der Flammifer von Westernis" (in German). Deutsche Tolkien Gesellschaft.
- Novik, Naomi (2008). His Majesty's Dragon (Limited ed.). Subterranean Press. ISBN 978-1-59606-148-4.
- Novik, Naomi (2008). Throne of Jade (Limited ed.). Subterranean Press. ISBN 978-1-59606-208-5.
- Beowulf and the Dragon, Walking Tree Publishers (2009), ISBN 978-3-905703-17-7 (the dragon episode of Beowulf, Old English text with the translation by John Porter, foreword by Tom Shippey)
- Ryan, J. S. (2009). Tolkien's View: Windows into his world. Walking Tree Publishers. ISBN 978-3-905703-13-9.

== See also ==
- Works inspired by J. R. R. Tolkien
- Faramir, featuring artwork by A. Eißmann
