= Denethor =

Fictional character from The Lord of the Rings

Denethor II, son of Ecthelion II, is a fictional character in J. R. R. Tolkien's novel The Lord of the Rings. He was the 26th ruling Steward of Gondor, dying by suicide in the besieged city of Minas Tirith during the Battle of the Pelennor Fields.

Denethor is depicted as embittered and despairing as the forces of Mordor close in on Gondor. Critics have noted the contrast between Denethor and both Théoden, the good king of Rohan, and Aragorn, the true king of Gondor. Others have likened Denethor to Shakespeare's King Lear, as both rulers fall into dangerous despair.

In The Lord of the Rings film trilogy, Peter Jackson chose to depict Denethor, played by John Noble, as greedy and self-indulgent, quite unlike Tolkien's powerful leader.

Other characters called Denethor in Tolkien's legendarium are Denethor I, a previous Steward (reigning from 2435 to 2477) and Denethor, son of Lenwë, a king of the Nandor.

== Fictional biography ==
Flag of the Stewards of Gondor

In Tolkien's Middle-earth, Denethor is the first son and third child of Ecthelion II, a Steward of Gondor. (Note: Tolkien 1996, pp. 206–207) He marries Finduilas, daughter of Prince Adrahil of Dol Amroth. She gives birth to two sons, Boromir and Faramir, but dies when they are ten and five years old, respectively. Denethor never remarries, and becomes grimmer and more silent than before. He is a man of great will, foresight, and strength, but also overconfident. Gandalf describes him as "proud and subtle, a man of far greater lineage and power [than Théoden of Rohan], though he is not called a king." (Note: Tolkien 1955, book 5, ch. 1 "Minas Tirith") Gandalf further comments:

He is not as other men of this time…by some chance the blood of Westernesse runs nearly true in him, as it does in his other son, Faramir, and yet did not in Boromir. He has long sight. He can perceive, if he bends his will thither, much of what is passing in the minds of men, even of those that dwell far off. It is difficult to deceive him, and dangerous to try.

Unlike Saruman, Denethor is too strong to be corrupted directly by Sauron. He begins secretly using a palantír to probe Sauron's strength, incorrectly insisting he can control it. The effort ages him quickly, and the impression of Sauron's overwhelming force that he gains from the palantír depresses him greatly, as Sauron biases what Denethor sees. Boromir's death depresses Denethor further. Nonetheless he continues to fight Sauron until the forces of Mordor arrive at the gates of Minas Tirith, at which point he loses all hope. In the published essay on the palantíri, Tolkien wrote: (Note: Tolkien 1980, pp. 526–527)

He [Denethor] must have guessed that the Ithil-stone [Sauron's palantír] was in evil hands, and risked contact with it, trusting his strength. His trust was not entirely unjustified. Sauron failed to dominate him and could only influence him by deceits. Saruman fell under the domination of Sauron... [while] Denethor remained steadfast in his rejection of Sauron, but was made to believe that his defeat was inevitable, and so fell into despair. The reasons for this difference were no doubt that in the first place Denethor was a man of great strength of will and maintained the integrity of his personality until the final blow of the (apparently) mortal wound of his only surviving son.

As invasion becomes certain, Denethor orders the warning beacons of Gondor to be lit, and summons forces from Gondor's provinces and from Rohan, (Note: Tolkien 1955, book 5, ch. 3 "The Muster of Rohan") while the people of Minas Tirith are sent away to safety. Denethor orders his son Faramir to take his men to defend the river crossing at Osgiliath and the great wall of the Rammas Echor. Faramir is wounded, apparently mortally; his body is carried back to the city. (Note: Tolkien 1955, book 5, ch. 4 "The Siege of Gondor")

'Hope on then!' laughed Denethor. 'Do I not know thee, Mithrandir? Thy hope is to rule in my stead, to stand behind every throne, north, south, or west... So! With the left hand thou wouldst use me for a little while as a shield against Mordor, and with the right bring up this Ranger of the North to supplant me. But I say to thee, Gandalf Mithrandir, I will not be thy tool! I am Steward of the House of Anarion. I will not step down to be the dotard chamberlain of an upstart. Even were his claim proved to me, still he comes but of the line of Isildur. I will not bow to such a one, last of a ragged house long bereft of lordship and dignity.' (Note: Tolkien 1955, book 5, ch. 7 "The Pyre of Denethor")

Denethor, grief-struck by the apparent loss of his son, orders his servants to burn him alive on a funeral pyre prepared for himself and Faramir in Rath Dínen. He breaks the white rod of his office over his knee, casting the pieces into the flames. He lies down on the pyre and so dies, clasping the palantír in his hands. Faramir is saved from the flames by Gandalf.

== Analysis ==
=== Character flaws ===
Denethor's madness and despair has been compared to that of Shakespeare's King Lear. Both men are first outraged when their children (Faramir and Cordelia, respectively) refuse to aid them, but then grieve upon their children's death – which is only perceived in the case of Faramir. According to Michael D. C. Drout, both Denethor and Lear "despair of God's mercy", something extremely dangerous in a leader who has to defend his realm. Sauron drives Denethor to suicide by showing him in the Palantír the Black Fleet approaching Gondor, while concealing the fact that the ships are carrying Aragorn's troops, coming to Gondor's rescue. The Tolkien scholar Tom Shippey comments that this forms part of a pattern around the use of the Palantír, that one should not try to see the future but should trust in one's luck and make one's own mind up, courageously facing one's duty in each situation. The medievalist Elizabeth Solopova comments that unlike Aragorn, Denethor is incapable of displaying what Tolkien in Beowulf: the Monsters and the Critics called "northern courage", namely, the spirit to carry on in the face of certain defeat and death. Alex Davis, in the J.R.R. Tolkien Encyclopedia, writes that many critics have examined his fall and corrupted leadership, whereas Richard Purtill identifies Denethor's pride and egoism, a man who considers Gondor his property. The Tolkien scholar Ali Mirzabayati suggests that Denethor has a pathological fear of defeat. In his view, Denethor's understanding of stewardship is superficial, limited to ruling and authority, so he clings desperately to power. This, exacerbated by his grief and mistrust of others, impairs his judgement and ability to defend his people.

=== Denethor vs Théoden ===
The Tolkien scholar Jane Chance contrasts Denethor both with another "Germanic king", Théoden, and with the "true king" of Gondor, Aragorn. In Chance's view, Theoden represents good, Denethor evil; she notes that their names are almost anagrams, and that where Theoden welcomes the Hobbit Merry Brandybuck into his service with loving friendship, Denethor accepts Merry's friend Pippin Took with a harsh contract of fealty. Chance writes that Tolkien further sets both Theoden and Denethor against the "Christian lord" Aragorn. In her opinion, Denethor "fails as a father, a master, a steward, and a rational man," giving in to despair, whereas Aragorn is brave in battle and gentle with his people, and has the Christlike attribute of healing.

Shippey makes the same comparison, extending it to numerous elements of the two Men's stories, writing that Théoden lives by a theory of Northern courage, and dies through Denethor's despair.

Tom Shippey's analysis of symmetry in the tales of Théoden and Denethor
Story element	Théoden, King of Rohan	Denethor, Steward of Gondor
Subgroup meets a helpful stranger	Aragorn, Gimli and Legolas meet Éomer	Frodo and Sam meet Faramir
Subgroup leader confronts the stranger	Aragorn defies Éomer	Frodo hides his quest from Faramir
Stranger decides to help the group, against their superior's wishes	Éomer lends horses	Faramir lets Frodo and Sam go
Leader is an old man who has lost a son	Théodred died in battle	Boromir died saving the Hobbits
Leader sees other heir as "doubtful replacement"	Éomer is a nephew	Faramir is scholarly, not warlike
Leader dies at time of Battle of the Pelennor Fields	Théoden dies in battle	Denethor commits suicide during battle
Leader's hall is described in detail	Meduseld, the "golden hall"	The stone hall in Minas Tirith
A Hobbit swears allegiance to leader	Merry joins the Riders of Rohan	Pippin becomes a palace guard of Gondor

== Adaptations ==
=== Early versions ===
Denethor was voiced by William Conrad in Rankin/Bass's 1980 animated adaptation of The Return of the King, and by Peter Vaughan in BBC Radio's 1981 serialization.

=== Peter Jackson's films ===
John Noble as Denethor in Peter Jackson's The Lord of the Rings: The Return of the King

Denethor is played by John Noble in Peter Jackson's film The Lord of the Rings: The Return of the King. The film portrays Denethor far more negatively than the novel. Tolkien calls Denethor

a masterful man, both wise and learned beyond the measure of those days, and strong willed, confident in his own powers, and dauntless. (...) He was proud, but this was by no means personal: he loved Gondor and its people, and deemed himself appointed by destiny to lead them in this desperate time.

Shippey commented that where Tolkien's Denethor is a cold ruler doing his best for his country, Jackson's is made to look greedy and self-indulgent; Shippey calls the scene where he gobbles a meal, while his son Faramir has been sent out in a hopeless fight, a "blatant [use] of cinematic suggestion".

Christianity Today wrote that the films "missed the moral and religious depths" of the book, such as when they turned "the awful subtlety and complexity of evil" into something trivially obvious. It gave as an example the depiction of what it felt was the powerful figure of Denethor as "a snarling and drooling oaf rather than a noble pessimist".

Daniel Timmons writes in the J.R.R. Tolkien Encyclopedia that Jackson characterizes Denethor and others in a way "far from Tolkien's text", but that the film version successfully "dramatizes the insidious temptation to evil", and that through "the falls of Saruman, Denethor, and Sauron, we see the bitter fruits of the lust for power and its corrupting influence."

== Sources ==
- Chance, Jane (1980) [1979]. Tolkien's Art: 'A Mythology for England'. Papermac. ISBN 0-333-29034-8.
- Shippey, Tom (2001). J. R. R. Tolkien: Author of the Century. HarperCollins. ISBN 978-0261-10401-3.
- Shippey, Tom (2005) [1982]. The Road to Middle-Earth: How J. R. R. Tolkien Created a New Mythology (Third ed.). HarperCollins. ISBN 978-0-261-10275-0.
- Tolkien, J. R. R. (1955). The Return of the King. The Lord of the Rings. Boston: Houghton Mifflin. OCLC 519647821.
- Tolkien, J. R. R. (1980). Christopher Tolkien (ed.). Unfinished Tales. Boston: Houghton Mifflin. ISBN 978-0-395-29917-3.
- Tolkien, J. R. R. (1996). Christopher Tolkien (ed.). The Peoples of Middle-earth. Boston: Houghton Mifflin. ISBN 978-0-395-82760-4.
