= Faramir =

Fictional character in The Lord of the Rings

- Middle-earth character
- First appearance: The Lord of the Rings (1954)

In-universe information
- Aliases: Steward of Gondor, Prince of Ithilien, Lord of Emyn Arnen
- Race: Men
- Family: Boromir (brother); Denethor II (father)
- Spouse: Éowyn
- Home: Gondor

Faramir is a fictional character in J. R. R. Tolkien's The Lord of the Rings. He is introduced as the younger brother of Boromir of the Fellowship of the Ring and second son of Denethor, the Steward of Gondor. Faramir enters the narrative in The Two Towers, where, upon meeting Frodo Baggins, he is presented with a temptation to take possession of the One Ring. In The Return of the King, he leads the forces of Gondor in the War of the Ring, coming near to death, succeeds his father as Steward, and wins the love of Éowyn, lady of the royal house of Rohan.

Tolkien wrote that of all his characters, Faramir was the most like him: Tolkien had fought in the First World War and had similarly had a vision of darkness. Scholars have likened Faramir's courage to that in the Old English poem The Battle of Maldon, and his hunting green-clad in Ithilien to the English folk hero and outlaw Robin Hood. The Tolkien scholar Jane Chance sees Faramir as central to a complex web of Germanic allegiance-relationships.

Faramir has been the subject of illustrations by Tolkien artists, including John Howe, Ted Nasmith and Anke Eißmann. He was voiced by Andrew Seear in the BBC's 1981 radio adaptation. He was played by David Wenham in Peter Jackson's film trilogy.

== Narrative ==
=== Background ===
[Faramir] read the hearts of men as shrewdly as his father, but what he read moved him sooner to pity than to scorn. He was gentle in bearing, and a lover of lore and of music, and therefore by many in those days his courage was judged less than his brother's. But it was not so, except that he did not seek glory in danger without a purpose. (Note: Tolkien 1955, Appendix A: I (iv))

— J.R.R. Tolkien, Appendix A to The Lord of the Rings

Faramir is the son of Denethor, who becomes steward of Gondor a year after Faramir's birth. (Note: Tolkien 1955, Appendix B, pp. 368–373) His mother is Finduilas, daughter of Prince Adrahil of Dol Amroth; she dies when Faramir is five, and is to him "but a memory of loveliness in far days and of his first grief". (Note: Tolkien 1955, book 6, ch. 5 "The Steward and the King") After her death Denethor becomes sombre, cold, and detached, but the relationship between Faramir and his elder brother Boromir, who is five years older, only grows closer, even though Denethor openly favours Boromir. Faramir is used to giving way and not airing his own opinions. (Note: Carpenter 2023, letter 244, draft, to a reader, 1963) Faramir displeases his father by welcoming the wizard Gandalf to Minas Tirith, Gondor's capital. Faramir, eager for knowledge, learns much from Gandalf about Gondor's history. (Note: Tolkien 1955, book 2, ch. 5 "The Window on the West")

Faramir looks much like Boromir, (Note: Tolkien 1955, Book 5, ch. 4 "The Siege of Gondor") who is described as "a tall man with a fair and noble face, dark-haired and grey-eyed, proud and stern of glance". (Note: Tolkien 1954a, book 2, ch. 2 "The Council of Elrond") In Faramir, "by some chance the blood of Westernesse [runs] nearly true". (Note: Tolkien 1955, book 5, ch. 1 "Minas Tirith") He does not enjoy fighting for its own sake.

Gondor had long been threatened by the nearby realm of Mordor, and in 3018 (when Faramir was 35) the Dark Lord Sauron begins the War of the Ring, attacking the ruined city of Osgiliath that guards the river crossing to Minas Tirith. Faramir and Boromir command the defence.

Shortly before the battle, Faramir has a prophetic dream, in which a voice speaks of the "Sword that was Broken" that is to be found at Imladris far to the north, about the awakening of "Isildur's Bane", the approach of "Doom", and the appearance of "the Halfling". Faramir decides to journey to Imladris and seek the advice of Elrond the Half-elven, but Denethor sends Boromir instead.

=== The Two Towers ===
“For myself,” said Faramir, “I would see the White Tree in flower again in the courts of the kings, and the Silver Crown return, and Minas Tirith in peace: Minas Anor again as of old, full of light, high and fair, beautiful as a queen among other queens: not a mistress of many slaves, nay, not even a kind mistress of willing slaves. War must be, while we defend our lives against a destroyer who would devour all; but I do not love the bright sword for its sharpness, nor the arrow for its swiftness, nor the warrior for his glory. I love only that which they defend: the city of the Men of Númenor; and I would have her loved for her memory, her ancientry, her beauty, and her present wisdom.”

— J.R.R. Tolkien, The Two Towers

Faramir first encounters the hobbits Frodo Baggins and Samwise Gamgee in Ithilien, and recognises them to be the Halflings mentioned in his dreams. Faramir questions Frodo about his quest, and Frodo reveals that he, along with eight other companions including Boromir, had set out from Rivendell. During the interrogation, Faramir asks often about Boromir, since he knows, as Frodo does not, that Boromir is already dead. One night, Faramir had waded down to the Anduin after seeing a boat there. It contained the dead body of his brother, who had been killed by Orcs after Frodo had left the group. Frodo tries to avoid the subject of his quest, but Faramir realises that Frodo was carrying something important to Sauron. Sam accidentally speaks of Boromir's desire for the One Ring, thus revealing what Frodo is carrying. Faramir then shows the crucial difference between him and his proud brother:

But fear no more! I would not take this thing, if it lay by the highway. Not were Minas Tirith falling in ruin and I alone could save her, so, using the weapon of the Dark Lord for her good and my glory. No, I do not wish for such triumphs, Frodo son of Drogo.

Faramir is wise enough to know that such a weapon is not to be used. He sees how his brother had been tempted beyond his strength, and wishes that he had gone on the quest himself. He gives the hobbits provisions and sends them on their way, warning Frodo that their guide, Gollum, is treacherous, and that an unknown terror lives on the pass of Cirith Ungol, where Gollum is leading them.

=== The Return of the King ===
[Pippin said:] 'Here was one with an air of high nobility such as Aragorn at times revealed, less high perhaps, yet also less incalculable and remote: one of the Kings of Men born into a later time, but touched with the wisdom and sadness of the Elder Race. [...] He was a captain that men would follow, [...] even under the shadow of the black wings [of the Nazgûl].'

— J.R.R. Tolkien, The Return of the King

The following evening, Faramir sends his company to reinforce the garrison at Osgiliath, while he and three men ride to Minas Tirith. They are pursued by the Nazgûl. Faramir rides back to help the fallen and is rescued by Gandalf. At Minas Tirith, Faramir reports to Denethor and Gandalf that he had met Frodo and Sam. Denethor becomes angry that Faramir had let them go to Mordor with the Ring, instead of bringing it to him.

The Witch-king of Angmar, leader of the Nazgûl, leads a large army from Minas Morgul, and seizes Osgiliath. Faramir stays with the rearguard, and is gravely wounded. The city's cavalry bring him back to Minas Tirith, and the Battle of the Pelennor Fields begins. Denethor believes the unconscious Faramir to be fatally injured. He has a funeral pyre built for himself and Faramir. The Hobbit Pippin Took, sworn into Denethor's service, alerts Gandalf, and Faramir is rescued from the flames. Mad with grief, Denethor lies down on the pyre, burning himself alive. (Note: Tolkien 1955, Book 5, ch. 7 "The Pyre of Denethor")

After the battle, Aragorn heals Faramir with athelas in the Houses of Healing. Recuperating, Faramir meets the Lady Éowyn of Rohan, and falls in love with her. At first, Éowyn refuses his advances, only desiring to find honour in death, but soon she loves him in return. (Note: Tolkien 1955, Book 5, ch. 8 "The Houses of Healing") Faramir becomes Steward, and prepares the city for the arrival of Aragorn, now King of Gondor. On the day of the coronation, Faramir surrenders his Stewardship. Aragorn, however, renews the office, announcing that as long as his line lasts, Faramir's descendants would be Stewards of Gondor. He makes Faramir Prince of Ithilien. (Note: Carpenter 2023, letter 323 to Christopher Tolkien, June 1971) In addition, as Steward Faramir serves as the King's chief counsellor and rules Gondor when the King is absent. With Éowyn, he settles in Ithilien, among the hills of the Emyn Arnen; they have a son named Elboron. After Faramir's death at the age of 120, his son succeeds him. Barahir, Faramir's grandson, writes The Tale of Aragorn and Arwen, said in the frame story to have been inserted in the Thain's Book by the writer Findegil. (Note: Tolkien 1954a, Prologue: "Note on the Shire records")

== Analysis ==
=== Medieval knight ===
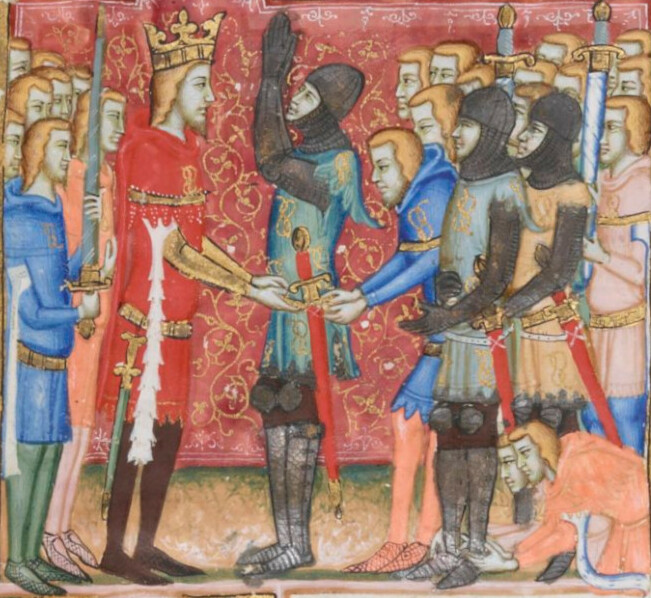
The scholar Jane Chance sees Faramir as involved in multiple feudal-style allegiance-relationships.

The Tolkien scholar Elizabeth Solopova states that Faramir's decision to reject the One Ring shows influences from a kind of courage and behaviour that was known to Tolkien from the medieval poem The Battle of Maldon. By not taking the Ring, Faramir rejects the desire for power and glory which a defeat of Sauron would bring him.

The Tolkien scholar Jane Chance analyses Faramir's place in what she identifies as an elaborate web of relationships based on a medieval Germanic worldview. Firstly, she describes Faramir and Boromir as a pair of opposites, good and evil brothers, which she likens to Theoden and Denethor whom she considers a pair of good and evil "Kings". (Note: Denethor is the Steward of Gondor, standing in for the King.) Secondly, she explores what she sees as a series of parallel instances of feudal allegiance (a man's oath of service to his lord, in return for protection) and betrayal (the breaking of that oath) involving Faramir and Frodo. Sam serves Frodo faithfully, but accidentally betrays him to Faramir with the smoke from his cooking fire and then by mentioning the Ring. Gollum's allegiance to Frodo is in the form of an oath sworn on the Ring, to obey Frodo and not to run off. Frodo "betrays" Gollum by luring him into the captivity of Faramir's men. Gollum then swears to Faramir that he will never return to the forbidden pool. The last of the parallel allegiance relationships is that Faramir grants Frodo protection, in the manner of a Germanic lord, and in return Frodo offers his service. Thirdly, after the War of the Ring, society is renewed as Aragorn marries Arwen, bringing the races of Man and Elf together, while in parallel to that Faramir marries Éowyn, bringing together the nations of Rohan and Gondor.

Imagemap with clickable links. Allegiances and betrayals around Faramir, as analysed by Jane Chance

=== Medieval outlaw ===
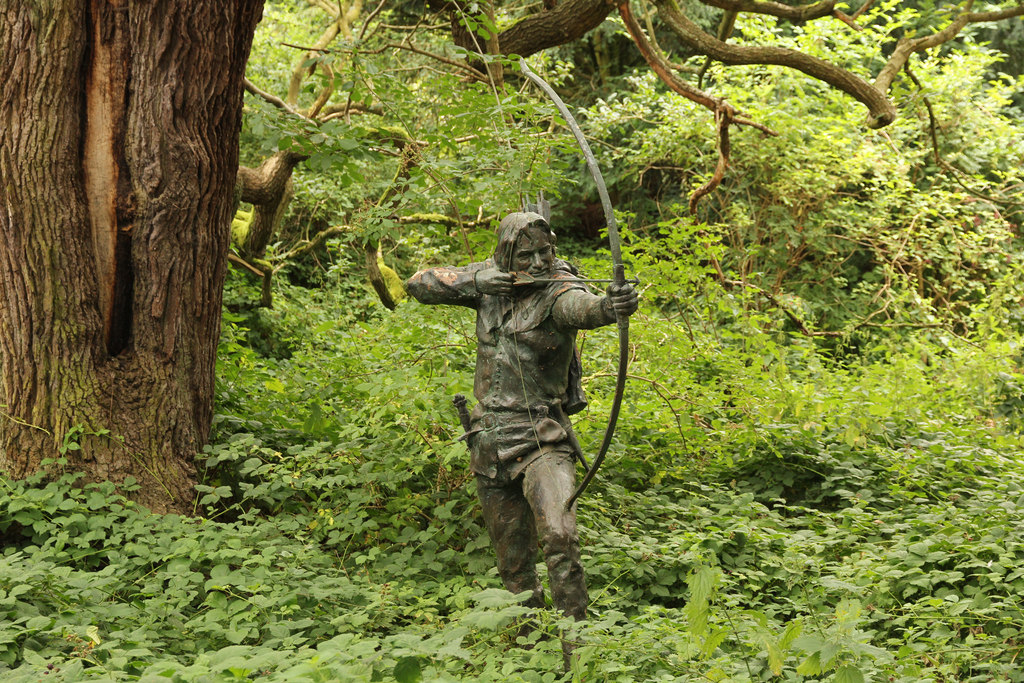
Faramir has repeatedly been likened to the legendary outlaw of Sherwood Forest, Robin Hood.

Several scholars have noted a likeness between Faramir and the legendary medieval figure of Robin Hood. Marjorie Burns sees a sign of Englishness, "a Robin Hood touch", in the green-clad Faramir and his men hunting the enemy in the forested Ithilien. P.N. Harrison comments that Faramir's "wilderness dwelling, his skill with the bow, and his choice of a green cloak, mask, and gauntlets as clothing all invite direct comparisons" with the outlaw of Sherwood Forest. Ben Reinhard, in Mythlore, writes that while there are medieval-style knights in The Lord of the Rings, and Faramir's conduct and speech are in many ways perfectly chivalric, he is definitely not a "knight in shining armour". Instead, he leads the attack on the men of Harad "in a thoroughly unchivalric guerilla ambuscade", while "clothing, weaponry, tactics, and [concealed] refuge" all indicate the opposite of the shining knight: the outlaw in the Greenwood.

=== Tolkien's personal experiences ===
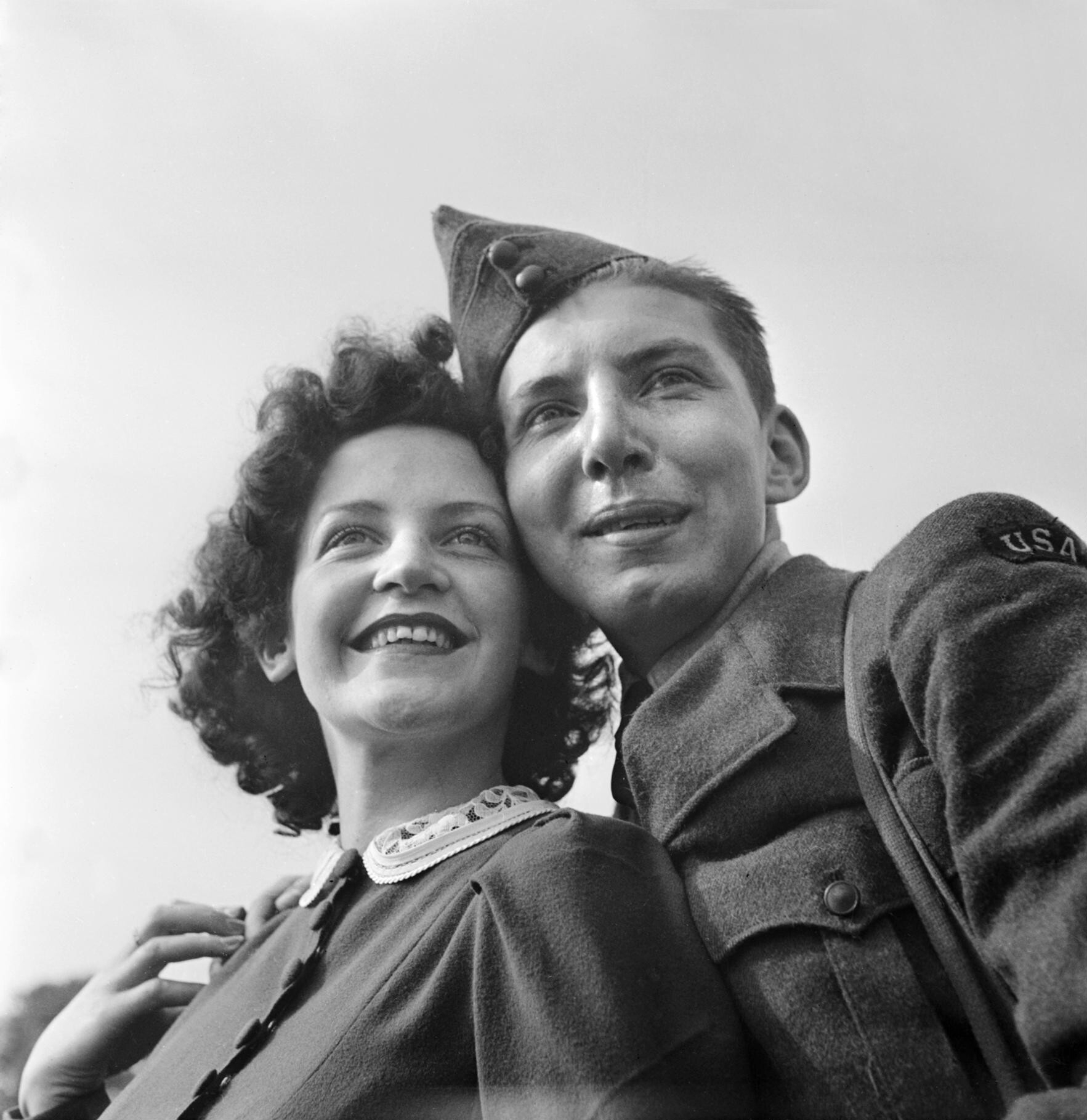
The rapid courtship of Faramir and Éowyn has been suggested to echo Tolkien's experience of war brides.

Tolkien's biographer John Garth, in his book Tolkien and the Great War: The Threshold of Middle-earth, writes that the resemblance between Faramir and the author, which Tolkien admitted in a letter ("As far as any character is 'like me', it is Faramir"), (Note: Carpenter 2023, letter 180 to Mr Thompson, draft, 14 January 1956) was that the two men were both soldiers and scholars, Faramir having "a reverence for the old histories and sacred values that helps him through a bitter war." Tolkien served as an officer in the British Army during the First World War, fighting in the Battle of the Somme in 1916. Tolkien bestowed his dream of "darkness unescapable" on Faramir, who narrates the dream to Éowyn. Of this, Tolkien wrote, "when Faramir speaks of his private vision of the Great Wave, he speaks for me. That vision and dream has been ever with me — and has been inherited (as I only discovered recently) by one of my children, Michael."

The scholar of literature Melissa A. Smith suggests that Tolkien's First World War experience of war brides may be reflected in Faramir's brief courtship of Éowyn. She notes that Tolkien wrote in response to criticism that "In my experience feelings and decisions ripen very quickly (as measured by mere 'clock-time', which is actually not justly applicable) in periods of great stress, and especially under the expectation of imminent death". Smith adds that Tolkien indeed married Edith Bratt just before he was posted to the Western Front in France.

Faramir's resemblance to the author and the medieval outlaw
| Attribute | Faramir | Tolkien | Robin Hood |
|---|---|---|---|
| Brief wartime courtship | ✓ | ✓ | |
| Scholar-soldier | ✓ | ✓ | |
| Dream of "darkness inescapable" | ✓ | ✓ | |
| Green clothing | ✓ | | ✓ |
| Skill with bow | ✓ | | ✓ |
| Ambush tactics | ✓ | | ✓ |
| Concealed refuge in forest | ✓ | | ✓ |

=== Development ===
In The History of The Lord of the Rings, Christopher Tolkien recorded that his father had not foreseen the emergence of Faramir during the writing of the book, only inventing him at the actual point of his appearance in The Two Towers. (Note: Tolkien 1990, chs. "Of Herbs and Stewed Rabbit" and "Faramir") Tolkien himself noted that the introduction of Faramir had led to postponement of the book's dénouement and to further development of the background for Gondor and Rohan. (Note: Carpenter 2023, letter 66 to Christopher Tolkien, 6 May 1944)

Faramir said: "Do not scorn pity that is the gift of a gentle heart, Éowyn! But I do not offer you my pity. For you are a lady high and valiant and have yourself won renown that shall not be forgotten; and you are a lady beautiful, I deem, beyond even the words of the Elven-tongue to tell. And I love you. Once I pitied your sorrow. But now, were you sorrowless, without fear or any lack, were you the blissful Queen of Gondor, still I would love you. Éowyn, do you not love me?"

— J.R.R. Tolkien, The Return of the King, after Tolkien had edited out all the "thou" and "thee" forms. (Note: Tolkien 1996, pp. 67–68, "The Appendix on Languages")

In early drafts, Tolkien had used the familiar forms thou and thee to show a sudden shift in the relationship between Faramir and Éowyn, a "deliberate change to a form of affection or endearment". Christopher Tolkien comments that

The 'sudden change' to which he referred here ... is possibly to be seen in their first meeting in the garden of the Houses of Healing, where Faramir says: 'Then, Éowyn of Rohan, I say to you that you are beautiful', but at the end of his speech changes to the 'familiar' form, 'But thou and I have both passed under the wings of the Shadow' (whereas Éowyn continues to use 'you'). In the following meetings, in this text, Faramir uses the 'familiar' forms, but Éowyn does not do so until the last ('Dost thou not know?'); and soon after this point my father went back over what he had written and changed every 'thou' and 'thee' to 'you'.

== Portrayal in adaptations ==
=== Art ===
Anke Eißmann's portrayal of Faramir interrogating Frodo

Faramir appears in several illustrations created by John Howe, Ted Nasmith and Anke Eißmann for The Lord of the Rings and related products. One of the scenes from the book that received many depictions is Faramir and Éowyn's meeting at the top of Minas Tirith.

=== Radio ===
In the BBC's 1981 radio adaptation of The Lord of the Rings, Faramir is voiced by Andrew Seear. The radio drama adhered faithfully to the books, and Peter Jackson gave the adaptation credit in the production of his film trilogy.

=== Film ===
In Rankin/Bass' 1980 adaptation of The Return of the King, a dark-haired man taken to be Faramir is shown next to Éowyn greeting Aragorn as he arrives to Minas Tirith.

David Wenham as Faramir in Peter Jackson's The Return of the King

In Peter Jackson's The Lord of the Rings film trilogy, Faramir is played by David Wenham. The actor joked that he got the role because he and Sean Bean, who played Boromir, both had large noses. The plot of the second film, The Lord of the Rings: The Two Towers, introduces a significant deviation from the book: Faramir does not at first let Frodo, Sam, and Gollum go, but decides to bring them and the Ring to Gondor. He takes them to Osgiliath and not until the Nazgûl attack the city and Frodo comes under the threat of capture does he release them. Jackson's explanation is that he needed another adventure to delay Frodo and Sam, because the episode at Cirith Ungol was moved to the third film, and so a new climax was needed. On the timeline given by Tolkien, Frodo and Sam had only reached the Black Gate at the time of the fall of Isengard. Jackson argues that it was necessary for Faramir to be tempted by the Ring because in his films everyone else was tempted, and letting Faramir be immune would seem inconsistent to a film audience. Jackson's portrayal of the Rangers' treatment of Gollum, who is beaten up, and Faramir's implicit compliance, have been criticised. In the book, Faramir calls the creature Sméagol instead of Gollum, and tells his men to "treat him gently, but watch him". (Note: Tolkien 1954, book 4, ch. 2 "The Forbidden Pool")

In the extended edition of The Two Towers, Jackson included an invented flashback scene in which Denethor neglects Faramir in favour of Boromir when sending him to Rivendell, so that Faramir wanted to please his father by bringing him the Ring. (The relationship is similarly strained in the book, but his father's favouritism does not seem to affect his decisions in Ithilien.) Reviewers have opined that the extended edition presents Faramir in a more favourable light.

=== Video games ===
Faramir is a bonus playable character in the video game The Return of the King. In a bonus video track within this game, Wenham says that "Faramir and Boromir were brothers, and it isn't beyond possibility that Faramir would have gone to Rivendell instead. And if that [had] happened, Faramir could have survived and returned to Gondor."

== Sources ==
- Burns, Marjorie (2005). Perilous Realms: Celtic and Norse in Tolkien's Middle-earth. University of Toronto Press. pp. 26–29. ISBN 978-0-8020-3806-7.
- Carpenter, Humphrey (1977). J. R. R. Tolkien: A Biography. New York: Ballantine Books. ISBN 978-0-04-928037-3.
- Carpenter, Humphrey, ed. (2023) [1981]. The Letters of J. R. R. Tolkien: Revised and Expanded Edition. New York: HarperCollins. ISBN 978-0-35-865298-4.
- Chance, Jane (1980) [1979]. Tolkien's Art: 'A Mythology for England'. Macmillan. ISBN 978-0-333-29034-7.
- Garth, John (2003). Tolkien and the Great War: The Threshold of Middle-earth. HarperCollins. ISBN 978-0-00711-953-0.
- Smith, Melissa A. (2015). "At Home and Abroad: Éowyn's Two-fold Figuring as War Bride in The Lord of the Rings". In Croft, Janet Brennan; Donovan, Leslie A. (eds.). Perilous and Fair: Women in the Works and Life of J. R. R. Tolkien. Mythopoeic Press. pp. 204–217. ISBN 978-1-887726-01-6. OCLC 903655969.
- Solopova, Elizabeth (2009). Languages, Myths and History: An Introduction to the Linguistic and Literary Background of J. R. R. Tolkien's Fiction. New York City: North Landing Books. ISBN 978-0-9816607-1-4.
- Tolkien, J. R. R. (1954a). The Fellowship of the Ring. The Lord of the Rings. Boston: Houghton Mifflin. OCLC 9552942.
- Tolkien, J. R. R. (1954). The Two Towers. The Lord of the Rings. Boston: Houghton Mifflin. OCLC 1042159111.
- Tolkien, J. R. R. (1955). The Return of the King. The Lord of the Rings. Boston: Houghton Mifflin. OCLC 519647821.
- Tolkien, J. R. R. (1990). Christopher Tolkien (ed.). The War of the Ring. Boston: Houghton Mifflin. ISBN 0-395-56008-X.
- Tolkien, J. R. R. (1996). Christopher Tolkien (ed.). The Peoples of Middle-earth. Boston: Houghton Mifflin. ISBN 978-0-395-82760-4.
