= Gríma Wormtongue =

Traitor and spy in The Lord of the Rings

Gríma
- Middle-earth character

In-universe information
- Aliases: Wormtongue, Worm
- Race: Men of Rohan
- Book(s): The Two Towers (1954); The Return of the King (1955); Unfinished Tales (1980)

Gríma, called (the) Wormtongue, is a fictional character in J. R. R. Tolkien's The Lord of the Rings. He serves as a secondary antagonist there; his role is expanded in Unfinished Tales. He is introduced in The Two Towers as the chief advisor to King Théoden of Rohan and henchman of Saruman.

To some psychologists, Wormtongue serves as an archetypal sycophant. Tolkien scholars note that Tolkien based Wormtongue on the untrustworthy character Unferth in Beowulf. He is presumptive, behaving as if he already rules Rohan, and exemplifies lechery, as correctly guessed by Gandalf; he hopes to become rich, and to take Éowyn as the woman he desires.

The name Gríma derives from the Old English or Icelandic word meaning "mask", "helmet", or "spectre".

== Appearances ==
=== The Two Towers ===
Gríma, son of Gálmód, is at first a faithful servant, but he falls in league with the traitorous wizard Saruman, and from then on works to weaken King Théoden of Rohan and his kingdom through lies and persuasion, in his position as chief advisor to the King. (Note: Tolkien 1954, book 3, ch. 6 "The King of the Golden Hall")

Tolkien describes him as "a wizened figure of a man, with a pale wise face, and heavy lidded eyes", and a "long pale tongue". Gríma is widely disliked in Edoras; everyone except Théoden calls him "Wormtongue". In Old English wyrm means "serpent, snake, dragon", and Gandalf repeatedly compares him to a snake:

The wise speak only of what they know, Gríma son of Gálmód. A witless worm have you become. Therefore be silent, and keep your forked tongue behind your teeth. I have not passed through fire and death to bandy crooked words with a serving-man till the lightning falls.

See, Théoden, here is a snake! To slay it would be just. But it was not always as it now is. Once it was a man, and it did you service in its fashion.

Saruman had promised him Éowyn, the king's niece, as a reward for his services. Her brother Éomer accuses him of "watching her under his lids and haunting her steps". His schemes are foiled when Gandalf the White and his companions arrived at Edoras, and convinces the king that he is not as weak as his adviser had made him seem. Upon Théoden's restoration, "many things which men had missed" are found locked in Gríma's trunk, including the king's sword, Herugrim. Théoden decides to go forth to battle at the Fords of Isen, and Gríma is given a choice: prove his loyalty and ride into battle with the king, or ride into exile. Choosing the latter, he goes to Saruman at Orthanc. Following the confrontation between Saruman and Gandalf, Gríma mistakenly throws the palantír of Orthanc at the Men of Rohan accompanying Gandalf, or possibly at Saruman himself, and so permits its capture by Peregrin Took. (Note: Tolkien 1954, book 3, ch. 10 "The Voice of Saruman")

=== The Return of the King ===
Gríma accompanies Saruman to the Shire, where Saruman seeks revenge for his defeat at Orthanc in petty tyranny over the Hobbits. During this time, Saruman shortens Gríma's nickname to "Worm" in order to demean him. When Saruman is overthrown by a hobbit rebellion and ordered to leave, Frodo Baggins implores Gríma not to follow him, and even offers him food, shelter, and forgiveness. Saruman counters by revealing to the Hobbits that Gríma had murdered and possibly eaten Lotho Sackville-Baggins, a kinsman of Frodo; whereupon Gríma kills Saruman by slitting his throat, and is in turn shot by Hobbit archers. (Note: Tolkien 1955, book 6, ch. 7 "The Scouring of the Shire")

=== Unfinished Tales ===
Gríma plays a major role in the back-story to The Lord of the Rings, prior to his first appearance in The Two Towers. In Unfinished Tales, Tolkien writes that Gríma is captured by the Nazgûl in the fields of the Rohirrim, while on his way to Isengard to inform Saruman of Gandalf's arrival at Edoras. He divulges what he knows of Saruman's plans to the Nazgûl, specifically his interest in the Shire, and its location. Gríma is set free, and the Nazgûl set out immediately for the Shire. In another version in the same chapter, this role is given to the squint-eyed southerner that the hobbits encounter at Bree. (Note: Tolkien 1980, part 3, ch. 4 "The Hunt for the Ring") Tolkien further suggests that Gríma may have given Théoden "subtle poisons" that cause him to age at an accelerated pace. (Note: Tolkien 1980, part 3, ch. 5 "The Battles of the Fords of Isen")

== Analysis ==
To the psychologists Deborah and Mark Parker, Wormtongue serves as an archetypal sycophant, flatterer, liar, and manipulator.

Tolkien scholars have noted that Wormtongue's interaction with Gandalf in Meduseld has an Old English counterpart in the epic poem Beowulf: the account is closely based on the hero Beowulf's dealings with Unferth in Heorot, where Unferth is King Hrothgar's "ambiguous" spokesman; Unferth is thoroughly discredited by Beowulf, as Wormtongue is by Gandalf.

The critic Charles W. Nelson describes Wormtongue's attitude as an example of presumption, behaving "as if he were already on the throne" of Rohan. Nelson notes that Richard Purtill suggests that Tolkien is intentionally embodying the seven deadly sins in his characters. He quotes from one of Tolkien's letters to this effect: "the encouragement of good morals in this real world, by the ancient device of exemplifying them in unfamiliar embodiments, that may tend to 'bring them home.'" Clark writes that Dwarves exemplify greed, Men pride, Elves envy, Ents sloth, Hobbits gluttony, Orcs anger, and Wormtongue lechery. That lechery is, Nelson notes, correctly guessed by Gandalf: that he would gain a large share in Meduseld's treasure, and Éowyn's hand in marriage, "on whose person Grima had long cast lecherous eyes and lascivious looks", and indeed in Éomer's words that Grima had "haunted her steps".

Colleen Donnelly writes that Wormtongue and Gollum are both distorted characters, and both end up disloyal to their masters. Donnelly notes that they are both "eaten up by desire", but comments that where Wormtongue is irredeemably full of treason against his lord, King Théoden of Rohan, Gollum remains open to kindness and can still intend to do good and honest service. Both characters end up unintentionally doing good through what seems to be an evil act: Wormtongue slits his master Saruman's throat, helping to end the harm being done to the hobbits' home, the Shire; while Gollum, desperate to get the One Ring, bites it off his master Frodo's finger and falls to his death, with the Ring, into the fires of Mount Doom, thus destroying the Ring and ending the Dark Lord Sauron's evil reign.

Gríma, as portrayed in Ralph Bakshi's The Lord of the Rings

== Portrayal in adaptations ==
Wormtongue (left, played by Brad Dourif) with King Theoden in Peter Jackson's The Two Towers as "a snivelling sidekick urging his master on to acts of increasing depravity"

In Ralph Bakshi's 1978 animated film adaptation of The Lord of the Rings, Wormtongue was voiced by Michael Deacon.

In Peter Jackson's Lord of the Rings films, Wormtongue was played by Brad Dourif, described in The Guardian as an "unnerving presence" and in The Independent as a "snivelling sidekick urging his master on to acts of increasing depravity". According to Dourif, Jackson encouraged him to shave off his eyebrows so that the audience would immediately have a subliminal reaction of unease to the character.

"The Scouring of the Shire" episode with the deaths of both Saruman and Wormtongue does not appear in the film version; the deaths were moved to an earlier scene, "The Voice of Saruman". The cut scene can be found on the Extended Edition DVD of The Return of the King.

== Sources ==
- Tolkien, J. R. R. (1954). The Two Towers. The Lord of the Rings. Boston: Houghton Mifflin. OCLC 1042159111.
- Tolkien, J. R. R. (1955). The Return of the King. The Lord of the Rings. Boston: Houghton Mifflin. OCLC 519647821.
- Tolkien, J. R. R. (1980). Christopher Tolkien (ed.). Unfinished Tales. Boston: Houghton Mifflin. ISBN 978-0-395-29917-3.
