= Jane Chance =

American scholar

- Born: 1945 (age 80–81)
- Years active: 1973–2011
- Known for: Tolkien studies
- Notable work: Tolkien's Art: A 'Mythology for England'

Jane Chance (born 1945), also known as Jane Chance Nitzsche, is an American scholar specializing in medieval English literature, gender studies, and J. R. R. Tolkien. She spent most of her career at Rice University, where since her retirement she has been the Andrew W. Mellon Distinguished Professor Emerita in English.

== Education ==
Chance earned her BA from Purdue University in 1967 with Highest Distinction and an Honors in English and her MA in English (1968) and PhD in Medieval English Literature (1971) from the University of Illinois at Urbana–Champaign.

== Teaching ==
She taught at the University of Saskatchewan and then moved to Rice University in 1973 to teach Old English literature; she was the first woman appointed to a tenure-track position in the English department there. She was appointed to the Andrew W. Mellon Professorship in 2008 and became emerita upon her retirement in 2011. She is founder president of the Consortium for the Teaching of the Middle Ages.

At Rice, Chance established what became the Medieval Studies Program; she headed the first Women's Studies program within the English department, which was nationally noted. In 1982 she was the first ever woman on the faculty at Rice University to gain maternity leave. In the late 1980s she was the first president of the Rice Commission on Women. She unsuccessfully sued the university for gender discrimination in 1988. She attempted to appeal the case in the early 1990s but was unsuccessful. In 1995 she established and funded the Julia Mile Chance Prize for Excellence in Teaching, named for her mother, "to honor women as teachers".

== Comparative literature and medievalism ==
As Jane Chance Nitzsche, Chance published a revised version of her dissertation as The Genius Figure in Antiquity and the Middle Ages in 1975. Beginning in 1994, she published a three-volume history of medieval mythography. Volume I, From Roman North Africa to the School of Chartres, A.D. 433–1177, was termed "monumental" and "highly detailed" by Sarah Stanbury in Arthuriana who nonetheless found the focus on gender poorly supported; although the reviewer in Speculum called it "disappointing"; Volume 2, From the School of Chartres to the Court at Avignon, 1177–1350, was called "immensely learned and ambitious" in the same journal in 2002. The final volume, The Emergence of Italian Humanism, 1321–1475, appeared in 2015, and was judged by one reviewer to be less comprehensive than claimed. In 1995 she also published Mythographic Chaucer: the Fabulation of Sexual Politics.

Other works in which Chance focuses on medieval women and gender studies include Woman as Hero in Old English Literature (1986), which investigated, among other things, the concept of women as peace-weavers and their frequent failure, and The Literary Subversions of Medieval Women (2007); she edited Gender and Text in the Later Middle Ages (1996) and Women Medievalists and the Academy (2005), which Helen Damico, writing in JEGP, called "massive in size and major in significance".

== Tolkien scholarship ==
Chance is a leading Tolkien scholar. Her books in this field include Tolkien's Art: A 'Mythology for England' (1979; revised edition 2001), The Lord of the Rings: The Mythology of Power (1992; revised edition 2001), in which she uses the theoretical framework of Michel Foucault, Tolkien and the Invention of Myth: A Reader (2004), and Tolkien, Self and Other: "This Queer Creature" (2016), a biography with literary analysis. Her book, Tolkien's Art: A 'Mythology for England' (1979; revised edition 2001) is considered to be one of the first scholarly studies of Tolkien's works. Through looking at Middle Earth in a new way with a Medieval lens, she adds a whole new world to the study of the works of Tolkien. She appeared in a 2001 episode of National Geographic, "Beyond the Movie:The Lord of the Rings" and another interview she did with National Geographic ended up in the Collector's DVD Edition of Peter Jackson's The Lord of the Rings: The Fellowship of the Ring.

== Honors and distinctions ==
Chance was awarded a Guggenheim Fellowship in 1980 and has also received membership in the Institute for Advanced Study in Princeton, New Jersey. In 1998 she won the IMAPCT Award for Outstanding Rice Faculty Women from Rice University.

She received numerous fellowships throughout the years for her research on Medieval Mythography. A few of the fellowships she received were the National Endowment for the Humanities (NEH) in the late 1970s, a Residency at the Rockefeller Foundation Bellagio in Lake Como, Italy in 1988, a Visiting Research Fellowship at the University of Edinburgh in the late 1980s, and a Eccles Research Fellow position at the University of Utah in the mid 1990s.

She won SCMLA Best Book awards for both the Medieval Mythography series and The Literary Subversions of Medieval Women.

In 2013 she was awarded an honorary doctorate of letters from Purdue University and honored in a symposium at the International Congress on Medieval Studies organized by the Medieval Foremothers' Society.

== Filmography ==
Year	Title	Role	Notes
2002	National Geographic: Beyond the Movie, "The Lord of the Rings"	Herself	National Geographic TV DVD; Directed by Lisa Kors
2005	Ringers: Lord of the Fans	Herself	SONY Pictures DVD; Directed by Carlene Cordova
