= Outline of Middle-earth =

Overview of the history of Middle-earth

The following outline is provided as an overview of and topical guide to the real-world history and notable fictional elements of J. R. R. Tolkien's fantasy universe. It covers materials created by Tolkien; the works on his unpublished manuscripts, by his son Christopher Tolkien; and films, games and other media created by other people.

Middle-earth – fantasy setting created by Tolkien, home to hobbits, orcs, ents, dragons, and many other races and creatures.

== Primary sources ==
=== Authors ===
- J. R. R. Tolkien
- Christopher Tolkien

=== Published works ===
==== By J. R. R. Tolkien ====
- The Hobbit (1937)
  - 2nd Edition (1951) revised to align with The Lord of the Rings
  - 3rd Edition (1966) revised to assert copyright in US
- The Lord of the Rings
  - The Fellowship of the Ring (1954)
    - The Shadow of the Past
    - The Council of Elrond
  - The Two Towers (1954)
  - The Return of the King (1955)
    - The Scouring of the Shire - a "novelistic" chapter
    - The Tale of Aragorn and Arwen
- The Adventures of Tom Bombadil (1962)
  - Revised edition (2014) with addition of original poems, sources and images, and commentary by Christina Scull and Wayne G. Hammond
- The Road Goes Ever On (1967) – music by Donald Swann, penmanship by Tolkien. See also Audio recordings
  - Revised edition (1978) – including a setting for Bilbo's Last Song

Posthumously published

- Bilbo's Last Song (1974) – Dutch translation published 1973
- "Guide to the Names in The Lord of the Rings" (1975) – also known as "Nomenclature of The Lord of the Rings"
- The Silmarillion (1977)
  - Ainulindalë
- Pictures by J. R. R. Tolkien (1979) – text by Christopher Tolkien. Most of these pictures had been previously published in calendars by Ballantine Books (1973) and George Allen & Unwin (1974, 1976–1979), some of them coloured by H. E. Riddett.
- Unfinished Tales (1980)
- J. R. R. Tolkien: Artist and Illustrator (1995) – text by Wayne G. Hammond and Christina Scull
- The Art of The Hobbit by J. R. R. Tolkien (2011) – text by Wayne G. Hammond and Christina Scull
- The Art of The Lord of the Rings by J. R. R. Tolkien (2015) – text by Wayne G. Hammond and Christina Scull

==== Edited by Christopher Tolkien ====
These works present extended selections of Tolkien's legendarium (the large body of documents relating to The Silmarillion), with extensive notes and posthumous editing by his son Christopher. The separate 4-volume body of his comments on the drafts of The Lord of the Rings is included as volumes 6–9.

===== The History of Middle-earth =====
Early legendarium
1 The Book of Lost Tales 1 (1983)
2 The Book of Lost Tales 2 (1984)
3 The Lays of Beleriand (1985)
4 The Shaping of Middle-earth (1986)
5 The Lost Road and Other Writings (1987)

The History of The Lord of the Rings
6 [1] The Return of the Shadow (1988)
7 [2] The Treason of Isengard (1989)
8 [3] The War of the Ring (1990)
9 [4] Sauron Defeated (1992)

The later Silmarillion
10 [1] Morgoth's Ring (1993)
11 [2] The War of the Jewels (1994)

Further details
12 The Peoples of Middle-earth (1996)

===== Other stories =====
- The Tolkien Reader and Tales from the Perilous Realm both reprint The Adventures of Tom Bombadil

Additional materials from the legendarium, with Christopher Tolkien's commentary.

- The Children of Húrin (2007)
- Beren and Lúthien (2017)
- The Fall of Gondolin (2018)
- The Fall of Númenor (2022)

==== Edited by other scholars ====
- The Annotated Hobbit (1988) – text of The Hobbit, with many related texts by Tolkien, edited and with commentary by Douglas A. Anderson (revised edition 2002)
- The Letters of J. R. R. Tolkien (1981) – selected, introduced and edited by Humphrey Carpenter
- The Nature of Middle-earth (2021) – essays and fragments, including on Elvish linguistics, with commentary by the scholar Carl F. Hostetter
- The History of The Hobbit (2007) – 2 volumes on the construction of The Hobbit with commentary by the scholar John D. Rateliff

=== Audio recordings ===
- Poems and Songs of Middle Earth (1967), Caedmon TC 1231 – poems read by Tolkien; songs sung by William Elvin, accompanied by composer Donald Swann (as published in The Road Goes Ever On)
- J. R. R. Tolkien Reads and Sings his The Hobbit & The Lord of the Rings (1975), Caedmon TC 1477, TC 1478 (based on an August, 1952 recording by George Sayer)
- J. R. R. Tolkien The Silmarillion Of Beren And Lúthien (1977), Caedmon TC 1564 – Christopher Tolkien reads chapter 19 of The Silmarillion, slightly abridged

=== Graphical works ===
- Tolkien's artwork
- Tolkien's maps
- Tolkien's scripts
  - Cirth
  - Sarati
  - Tengwar

== Translation ==
- Translations of The Hobbit
- Translating The Lord of the Rings (issues, challenges, approaches)
  - Translation of The Lord of the Rings into Swedish
  - List of translations of The Lord of the Rings

== Adaptations and developments ==
=== Maps ===
- A Map of Middle-earth, meaning either of two posters:
  - by Barbara Remington (1965)
  - by Pauline Baynes (1970)
- The Atlas of Middle-earth (1981, revised ed 1991) by Karen Wynn Fonstad
- Journeys of Frodo: An Atlas of J. R. R. Tolkien's The Lord of the Rings (1981) by Barbara Strachey

=== Spoken word ===
- The Hobbit (1974) – Nicol Williamson recorded an abridged, dramatic version for Decca Records on the Argo label
- The Lord of the Rings (1990) – unabridged recording by Rob Inglis for Recorded Books
- The Hobbit (1991) – unabridged recording by Rob Inglis for Recorded Books
- The Children of Húrin (2007) – Christopher Lee recorded an unabridged audiobook
- The Hobbit (2020) – Andy Serkis live-streamed an unabridged reading to raise money for NHS Charities Together
- The Hobbit (2020) – unabridged recording by Andy Serkis for HarperCollinsUK and Recorded Books
- The Lord of the Rings (2021) – unabridged recording by Andy Serkis for HarperCollinsUK and Recorded Books

=== Radio ===
- The Lord of the Rings (1955) – BBC: six 45-minute episodes for The Fellowship of the Ring, then six 30-minute episodes for all of The Two Towers and The Return of the King, adapted by Terence Tiller
- The Hobbit (1968) – BBC: eight half-hour episodes, adapted by Michael Kilgarriff
- The Lord of the Rings (1979) – National Public Radio: totalling over 11 hours, adapted by Bernard Mayes
- The Lord of the Rings (1981) – BBC: 26 half-hour instalments, later re-cut to 13 hour-long instalments, adapted by Brian Sibley and Michael Bakewell
- Der Herr der Ringe (1991) – Südwestrundfunk and Westdeutscher Rundfunk: German adaptation of The Lord of the Rings in 30 half-hour episodes, by Peter F. Steinbach

=== Motion pictures ===
- The Hobbit (1967) – Gene Deitch's short animated adaptation
- The Hobbit (1977) – an animated musical television special by Rankin/Bass
- The Lord of the Rings (1978) – an animated film of the first half of the book by Ralph Bakshi
- The Hobbit (1979) – children's program Jackanory broadcast ten 15-minute episodes
- The Return of the King (1980) – the animated sequel to 1977's The Hobbit
- Khraniteli (1991) - a "lost" Russian television play, now recovered
- Hobitit (1993) - a Finnish rendering of the Hobbits' journey in The Lord of the Rings
- The Lord of the Rings: The Rings of Power (2022) – prequel series by Amazon Studios

==== Peter Jackson ====
- The Lord of the Rings film series – the live-action trilogy by Peter Jackson
  - Films
    - The Lord of the Rings: The Fellowship of the Ring (2001)
    - The Lord of the Rings: The Two Towers (2002)
    - The Lord of the Rings: The Return of the King (2003)
  - Production
    - Wētā Workshop
  - Music
    - Recordings
  - Peter Jackson's interpretation
- The Hobbit film series – Jackson's three-part prequel to his The Lord of the Rings series
  - Films
    - The Hobbit: An Unexpected Journey (2012)
    - The Hobbit: The Desolation of Smaug (2013)
    - The Hobbit: The Battle of the Five Armies (2014)
  - Music

=== Stage ===
- Rob Inglis wrote and performed one-man adaptations of The Hobbit and The Lord of the Rings starting in the 1970s
- Lord of the Rings (2006) – Musical staged in Toronto, re-written for London in 2007

=== Games ===
==== Tabletop games ====
- Middle-earth Role Playing (1984) – Iron Crown Enterprises
- Lord of the Rings Adventure Game (1991) – Iron Crown Enterprises
- The Lord of the Rings Roleplaying Game (2002) –Decipher, Inc.
- The One Ring: Adventures over the Edge of the Wild (2011) – Cubicle 7
- Adventures in Middle-earth (2016) – OGL supplement by Cubicle 7

==== Video games ====
- The Hobbit (1982)
- Elendor (1991)
- The Lord of the Rings: The Two Towers (2002)
- The Hobbit (2003)
- The Lord of the Rings: The Return of the King (2003)
- The Lord of the Rings: The Third Age (2004)
- The Lord of the Rings: The Battle for Middle-earth (2004)
- The Lord of the Rings: The Third Age (Game Boy Advance) (2004)
- The Lord of the Rings: The Battle for Middle-earth II (2006)
- The Lord of the Rings: The Battle for Middle-earth II: The Rise of the Witch-king (2006)
- The Lord of the Rings: The White Council (2007; cancelled)
- The Lord of the Rings Online: Shadows of Angmar (2007)
- The Lord of the Rings: Conquest (2009)
- The Lord of the Rings: Tactics (2009)
- The Lord of the Rings: Aragorn's Quest (2010)
- The Lord of the Rings: War in the North (2011)
- Guardians of Middle-earth (2012)
- Lego The Lord of the Rings (2012)
- Lego The Hobbit (2014)
- Middle-earth: Shadow of Mordor (2014)
- Middle-earth: Shadow of War (2017)

=== Parodies ===
- Bored of the Rings (1969) – Harvard Lampoon novel
- Hordes of the Things (1980) – BBC radio series
- Bored of the Rings (1985) – Delta 4 video game
- The Boggit: Bored Too (1986) – Delta 4 video game
- Muddle Earth (2003) – children's novel by Paul Stewart
- Fellowship! (2004) – musical

== Geography ==
=== Cosmology of Eä ===
- Two Trees of Valinor

=== Continents of Arda ===
- Middle-earth
- Númenor
- Valinor (on Aman)

=== Nations and regions ===
- Beleriand
- Gondor
- Harad
- Lothlórien
- Mordor
- Rohan
- The Shire

=== Natural features ===
- The Lonely Mountain
- Mirkwood
- The Old Forest

=== Cities and other populated places ===
- Bag End
- Bree
- Esgaroth
- Isengard
- Moria
- Rivendell

== History ==
=== Artefacts ===
- Mithril
- The Palantíri
- Phial of Galadriel
- Rings of Power
  - The One Ring
- The Silmarils
- Weapons and armour

=== Events ===
First Age

- Sundering of the Elves

Third Age

- Battle of Helm's Deep
- Battle of the Pelennor Fields
- Battle of the Morannon
- The Scouring of the Shire

=== Characters ===
==== First Age ====
House of Finwë

- Finwë
- Fëanor
- Maedhros
- Finrod Felagund
- Galadriel
- Glorfindel

House of Elwë and Olwë

- Thingol
- Lúthien

House of Marach

- Húrin
- Túrin Turambar
- Tuor
- Eärendil and Elwing
- Elrond
- Arwen

Others

- Beren
- Sauron
- Ungoliant

==== Second Age ====
- Elendil
- Gil-galad
- Isildur

==== Third Age ====
Thorin and Company

- Thorin Oakenshield
- Balin
- Bilbo Baggins
- Gandalf

The Company of the Ring

- Frodo Baggins
- Samwise Gamgee
- Merry Brandybuck
- Pippin Took
- Aragorn
- Boromir
- Gandalf
- Legolas
- Gimli

Wizards:

- Gandalf
- Radagast
- Saruman

Elves

- Arwen
- Galadriel
- Glorfindel
- Legolas
- Thranduil

Men

- Aragorn
- Bard
- Boromir
- Denethor
- Éomer
- Éowyn
- Faramir
- Gríma Wormtongue
- Théoden

Other characters

- Barrow-wight
- Beorn
- Goldberry
- Gollum
- Old Man Willow
- Shelob
- Treebeard
- Tom Bombadil
- Watcher in the Water

== Culture ==
=== Races ===
Ainur

- Valar
- Maiar
  - Balrogs
  - Wizards

Men

- Drúedain
- Dúnedain

Monsters

- Dragons
- Nazgûl
- Orcs
- Trolls
- Wargs

Other

- Dwarves
- Eagles
- Elves
- Ents
- Hobbits

=== Languages ===
Elvish languages

- Quenya
  - Grammar of late Quenya
- Sindarin

Other

- Adûnaic
- Khuzdul
- Black Speech

=== Folklore and poetry ===
- A Elbereth Gilthoniel
- A Walking Song
- Namárië
- Song of Eärendil
- Errantry
- Fastitocalon
- The Lay of Leithian
- The Lay of the Children of Húrin
- The Man in the Moon Stayed Up Too Late
- The Road Goes Ever On
- The Sea-Bell
- The Tale of Aragorn and Arwen
- Beren and Lúthien

== Analysis ==
=== Influences ===
- J. R. R. Tolkien's influences
  - Nodens
  - Ring of Silvianus
  - Sigelwara Land
- Tolkien's impact on fantasy

=== Components ===
- Artwork
- Family trees
- Heraldry
- for Tolkien's invented Languages, see above
- Maps
- Non-narrative elements
- Tolkien's poetry
  - Poetry in The Lord of the Rings
  - see above for individual poems

=== Literary devices ===
- Anachronism
- Character pairing
- Editorial framing
- Frame stories
  - Ælfwine
  - (see also The Lost Road)
  - The Notion Club Papers
  - Red Book of Westmarch
- Impression of depth
- Interlacing
- Narrative structure
- Prose style
  - Ambiguity

=== Sources ===
- Antiquarianism
- Beowulf
- Celtic
- Classical world
- Finnish influences
- First World War
- Modern
- Norse
- Philology
- Shakespeare

=== Themes ===
- Addiction to power
- Ancestry as guide to character
- Architecture
- Christianity
- Decline and fall
- England
- Environmentalism
- Heroism
- Languages
- Light
- Luck and fate
- Magic
- Medieval
- Moral dilemma
- Music
- Naming of weapons
- Northern courage
- Old Straight Road
- Paganism
- Plants
- Psychological journeys
- Quests
- Race
- Sexuality
- Sound and language
- Time
- Trees and forests
- Women

=== Music ===
- Music of The Lord of the Rings film series
- The Tolkien Ensemble

=== Scholarship ===
==== Institutions ====
- Tolkien Gateway
- The Tolkien Society
- The Mythopoeic Society

- Elvish Linguistic Fellowship

- Marion E. Wade Center
- Signum University

==== Journals ====
- Journal of Tolkien Research
- Mallorn
- Mythlore
- Tolkien Studies
- Vinyar Tengwar

==== Scholars ====
- Douglas A. Anderson
- Nicholas Birns
- Stratford Caldecott
- Jane Chance
- Patrick Curry
- Michael D. C. Drout
- Jonathan Evans
- Jason Fisher
- Verlyn Flieger
- John Garth
- Glen GoodKnight
- Wayne G. Hammond
- Stuart D. Lee
- Jared Lobdell
- Catherine McIlwaine
- Gergely Nagy
- Corey Olsen
- John D. Rateliff
- Fleming Rutledge
- Christina Scull
- Elizabeth Solopova
- Sandra Ballif Straubhaar
- Richard C. West
- Ralph C. Wood

==== Biographical works ====
- J. R. R. Tolkien: A Biography (1977) – by Humphrey Carpenter
- Tolkien and the Great War (2003) – by John Garth
- The Ring of Words: Tolkien and the Oxford English Dictionary (2006) – by Peter Gilliver, Jeremy Marshall and Edmund Weiner

==== Works ====
- Tolkien: A Look Behind "The Lord of the Rings" (1969) – by Lin Carter (revised 2003 by Adam Roberts)
- The Complete Guide to Middle-earth (1971) – ed. Robert Foster (revised 1978, 2001)
- Master of Middle-Earth (1972) – by Paul H. Kocher
- Tolkien's Art: 'A Mythology for England' (1979) – by Jane Chance
- The Road to Middle-Earth (1982) – by Tom Shippey (revised 1993, 2005)
- Splintered Light (1983) – by Verlyn Flieger
- J. R. R. Tolkien: Author of the Century (2000) – by Tom Shippey
- Tolkien's Legendarium: Essays on The History of Middle-earth (2000) – eds Verlyn Flieger and Carl F. Hostetter
- Tolkien: A Cultural Phenomenon (2003) – by Brian Rosebury
- The Lord of the Rings: A Reader's Companion (2005) – by Wayne G. Hammond and Christina Scull
- The J. R. R. Tolkien Companion and Guide (2006) – by Wayne G. Hammond and Christina Scull
- The J. R. R. Tolkien Encyclopedia (2006) – ed. Michael D. C. Drout
- A Companion to J. R. R. Tolkien (2014) – ed. Stuart D. Lee
- Tolkien: Maker of Middle-earth (2018) – by Catherine McIlwaine
- The Worlds of J. R. R. Tolkien (2020) – by John Garth

== See also ==
- List of The Hobbit characters
- List of original characters in The Lord of the Rings film series
