= The Road Goes Ever On =

1967 song cycle and book

The Road Goes Ever On: a Song Cycle
- First edition (Houghton Mifflin)
- Author: J. R. R. Tolkien (lyrics & main text); Donald Swann (music)
- Illustrator: J. R. R. Tolkien (page decorations)
- Language: English
- Subject: Middle-earth
- Genre: sheet music & commentary
- Publisher: Houghton Mifflin (USA); George Allen & Unwin (UK)
- Publication date: 31 October 1967 (USA); 14 March 1968 (UK)
- Media type: print; in audio as Poems and Songs of Middle-earth
- Preceded by: The Tolkien Reader
- Followed by: Smith of Wootton Major

The Road Goes Ever On is a song cycle first published in 1967 as a book of sheet music and as an audio recording. The music was written by the entertainer Donald Swann, and the words are taken from poems in J. R. R. Tolkien's Middle-earth writings, especially The Lord of the Rings. The title of the song cycle is taken from "The Road Goes Ever On", the first song in the collection. The songs are designed to fit together when played in sequence. The ninth song "Lúthien Tinúviel" was added in an appendix rather than in the main sequence. Swann performed the cycle for Tolkien, who approved of the music except for the Quenya song "Namárië"; he suggested it should be in the style of a Gregorian chant, which he hummed; Swann used that melody for the song.

== Background ==
J. R. R. Tolkien was a scholar of English literature, a philologist and medievalist interested in language and poetry from the Middle Ages, especially that of Anglo-Saxon England and Northern Europe. His professional knowledge of works such as Beowulf shaped his fictional world of Middle-earth, including his fantasy novel The Lord of the Rings.

With Tolkien's approval, Donald Swann wrote the music for this song cycle, consisting of settings of some of Tolkien's poetry in The Lord of the Rings. Much of it resembles English traditional music or folk music. The sole exception is the Quenya song "Namárië", which was based on a tune by Tolkien himself; it has some affinities to Gregorian chant. In his foreword to the second edition, Swann explains that he performed the song cycle to Tolkien in Priscilla Tolkien's garden. Tolkien approved of the music except for "Namárië", and hummed its melody; Swann used that for the song.

== Content ==
The sheet music for the songs occupies most of the book, pages 1–62 and 78–84 in the 2002 edition.

=== List of songs ===
The 1967 song-cycle (as released on LP and CD) is as follows. Keys are given, but Swann notes in the foreword to the third edition that transposition is acceptable.

Song cycle
ToC	CD	Title	Source	Language	Key	Tempo	Time sig.
1	1	"The Road Goes Ever On"	LOTR, Book 1, ch. 1 "A Long-expected Party", ch. 3 "Three is Company", and Book 6, ch. 6 "Many Partings"	English	E-flat major	Moderately	4/4
2	2	"Upon the Hearth the Fire Is Red"	LOTR, Book 1, ch. 3 "Three is Company"	English	G major (Note: With some B minor in verse 3.)	Lively	2/2
3	3	"In the Willow-meads of Tasarinan"	LOTR, Book 3, ch. 4 "Treebeard"	English	D minor	Resolutely, not fast	4/4
4	4	"In Western Lands"	LOTR, Book 6, ch. 1 "The Tower of Cirith Ungol"	English	F major	Steadily	4/4
5	5	"Namárië"	LOTR, Book 2, ch. 8 "Farewell to Lórien"; Gregorian theme by Tolkien	Quenya	A major	Freely	(not marked)
6	6	"I Sit Beside the Fire"	LOTR, Book 2, ch. 3 "The Ring Goes South"	English	D major	Gently flowing	2/2
7	8	"Errantry"	The Adventures of Tom Bombadil	English	D major (Note: With several key changes.)	With easy motion	2/4

The following songs were added to the CD (but not the LP) after the first edition. A Elbereth Gilthoniel forms a continuation of song 6, "I Sit Beside the Fire", in the text, but is a separate track on the CD. "Lúthien Tinúviel" has an ambiguous status: it is shown as song 9 of the cycle in the table of contents, but it is placed in an appendix, not the main cycle, with a note that it could be incorporated into the main sequence by singing it in D major, described by Swann as "a more baritonal key".

Additional songs
ToC	CD	Title	Source	Language	First appearance	Key	Tempo	Time signature
(at end of 6)	7	"A Elbereth Gilthoniel"	LOTR, Book 2, ch. 1 "Many Meetings"	Sindarin	3rd Edition, 2002	(continues "I Sit Beside the Fire")		
8	9	"Bilbo's Last Song (At the Grey Havens)"	Given to Tolkien's secretary, Margaret Joy Hill, after his death	English	2nd Edition, 1978	G major	Flowing slowly	3/4
9 (Appdx)	10	"Lúthien Tinúviel"	The Silmarillion, ch. 19 "Of Beren and Lúthien"	English	3rd Edition, 2002	F major	Poco appassionato	3/4

=== Non-musical materials ===
One of Tolkien's decorative tailpieces created for the book

The text provides Tolkien's notes and translations of the two Elvish poems in the song cycle, on pages 63–76 of the 2002 edition. The book contains one of the longest samples of the constructed language Quenya, in the shape of the song "Namárië", as well as the Sindarin prayer "A Elbereth Gilthoniel", with grammatical explanations. Tolkien's notes in the book provided information about the First Age of Middle-earth that was not otherwise publicly available until 1977, when The Silmarillion appeared.

In addition, Tolkien contributed decorations in the form of elvish script for the top and bottom of every page of sheet music, and tailpieces for the spaces at the ends of the poems.

== Publication history ==
The first edition of The Road Goes Ever On: a Song Cycle was published on 31 October 1967, in the United States.

An LP record that included the song cycle was recorded on 12 June 1967 as Poems and Songs of Middle Earth, with Donald Swann on piano and William Elvin (Note: William Elvin was born in Turriff, Scotland in 1945. He trained at the Royal Academy of Music and sang as a soloist with Scottish Opera and then the Royal Opera House.) singing. Side one of this record consisted of Tolkien himself reading six poems from The Adventures of Tom Bombadil. The first track on side two was Tolkien reading part of the Elvish prayer "A Elbereth Gilthoniel" from book 2, chapter 1 of The Lord of the Rings. The remainder of side two contained the song cycle performed by Swann and Elvin. The LP record was released by Caedmon Records (TC 1231).

The second edition of The Road Goes Ever On, published in 1978, added music for "Bilbo's Last Song." This song was also published separately.

The third edition, published in 1993, added music for "Lúthien Tinúviel" from The Silmarillion, which had earlier appeared in The Songs of Donald Swann: Volume I. The third edition of The Road Goes Ever On was packaged with a CD that duplicated the song cycle (but not Tolkien's readings) from the 1967 LP record. The CD also included two new recordings. The third edition was reprinted in hardcover in 2002 by Harper Collins (ISBN 0-00-713655-2); this had the same text and CD as the 1993 edition.

== Analysis ==
The scholar Richard Leonberger states that Swann composed the nine settings over a period of 12 years. He began by setting seven poems from The Lord of the Rings to music in Ramallah, near Jerusalem, in 1965. These included A Elbereth Gilthoniel and O Orofarnë, Lassemista, Carnimírië; he replaced the latter with Namárië for the first edition as he felt it was too similar to Henry Purcell's "Dido's Lament".

The scholar of music Emily Sulka notes that the song cycle was created because Swann and his wife liked Tolkien's writings, and set six of the poems to music. Tolkien liked five of the settings, but proposed a melody similar to a Gregorian chant in place of the sixth, for Namárië. She notes too that Swann wanted them to be performed as a group without applause between the songs. In her view, the cycle has the theme of travel: the walking songs launch into an adventure to unknown lands, but returning home; "In the Willow-Meads of Tasarinan" speaks of Treebeard's travels in many lands, from spring to winter; "In Western Lands" in contrast begins with Sam in despondent mood, but ends with a feeling of hope. "I Sit Beside the Fire" portrays a traveller, Bilbo, reflecting on his journeys; it ends with a quotation of the melody of "The Road Goes Ever On", a poem that recurs (adapted to each context) in The Lord of the Rings. Sulka thus sees Tolkien and Swann using the poems and music to link the story of the novel with "the road always continuing, even when one's individual travel is finished". She finds Swann's account of Tolkien's poems "highly effective".

The educationist Estelle Jorgensen states that she was "struck by Swann's simple, folklike, and tonal strophic settings, harking back to an earlier time before atonal music, which seems appropriate to the rustic character of the hobbits and others he portrays." She notes that the chosen texts reflect the journey and its metaphor of the road of life, ending with the longest of the poems, "Errantry", in which the wanderer ends one journey and begins the next. In her view, the setting of "In the willow-meads of Tasarinan" captures Treebeard's strength and resilience, but not the quality of chanting that Tolkien mentions, nor the fact that the Ents had been influenced by elvish music.

For music education, Jorgensen writes that the familiarity of Peter Jackson's films of The Lord of the Rings means that Tolkien's mythology can be explored via Tolkien's prose, his poetry, film, and music. She suggests that the poetry can be compared with Swann's settings; and that "students can improvise, compose, perform, and record" their own melodies for the texts, or write and perform their own stories in which the songs might feature. She notes that in Middle-earth, singing was natural and a pleasure, as it was in times before amplified popular music changed the style of the human voice.

== Sources ==
- Carpenter, Humphrey, ed. (2023) [1981]. The Letters of J. R. R. Tolkien: Revised and Expanded Edition. New York: HarperCollins. ISBN 978-0-35-865298-4.
