= Bilbo's Last Song =

1973 poem by J.R.R. Tolkien

- 3rd edition; Red Fox, 2012
- Author: J. R. R. Tolkien
- Illustrator: Pauline Baynes
- Language: English
- Genre: Verse
- Publication date: 1974 as a poster, 1990 as a book
- Publication place: United Kingdom
- Media type: Print
- Preceded by: Smith of Wootton Major
- Followed by: The Father Christmas Letters

Bilbo's Last Song (at the Grey Havens) is a poem by J. R. R. Tolkien, written as a pendant to his fantasy The Lord of the Rings. It was first published in a Dutch translation in 1973, subsequently appearing in English on posters in 1974 and as a picture-book in 1990. It was illustrated by Pauline Baynes, and set to music by Donald Swann and Stephen Oliver. The poem's copyright was owned by Tolkien's secretary, to whom he gave it in gratitude for her work for him.

== Gift to Joy Hill ==
In 1968, aged seventy-six, Tolkien decided to retire from his house at 76 Sandfield Road, Headington, Oxford to a bungalow at 19 Lakeside Road, Poole, near Bournemouth. (Note: Tolkien. J. R. R.: The Letters of J. R. R. Tolkien; Allen & Unwin, 1981; pp. 390–396) On 17 June, while preparing for his relocation, he fell downstairs and badly injured his leg. He needed surgery, a plaster cast, crutches and several weeks of recuperation in the Nuffield Orthopaedic Centre and Bournemouth's Miramar Hotel before he was well enough to resume living independently. When he finally moved into his new home on 16 August, he found that unpacking his forty-eight crates of books and papers was too much for him. He sought the help of Margaret Joy Hill, a secretary whom his publisher, Allen & Unwin, had assigned to deal with his fan mail, and whom he and his wife had come to regard almost as a second daughter. During circa 14–18 October, while Hill was helping Tolkien to set up his new office and library, she made a discovery. "As I picked up a pile of books in my arms and put them on the shelf", she recalled in 1990, "something dropped out from between two of them. It was an exercise book: just the cover with a single sheet between, and on the page, a poem. [Tolkien] asked what it was; I gave it to him, and he read it aloud. It was Bilbo's Last Song.

The fan mail that Hill brought from Allen & Unwin to Tolkien included many packages. Hill and Tolkien used to enjoy guessing what kind of presents his devotees had sent to him. "One day", she remembered, "as he cut the string on a packet, he said 'If I find this is a gold bracelet studded with diamonds, it is to be yours.' Of course it wasn't, but the bracelet became a joke between us." On a later visit on circa 3 September 1970, Hill recollected, "[Tolkien] said: 'We've opened all the parcels and there was no gold bracelet for you. I've decided that Bilbo's Last Song is going to be your bracelet.'" Tolkien formalized his gift on 28 October 1971, sending Hill an annotated typescript of the poem and a covering letter: "Dear Joy, I have appended the following note to the copy of Bilbo's Last Song (at the Grey Havens) which I retain. A copy of this poem was presented to Miss M. Joy Hill on 3 September 1970, and also the ownership of the copyright of this poem, with the intention that she should have the right to publish it, or to dispose of the copyright, as she might wish to do, at any time after my death. This was a free gift as a token of gratitude for her work on my behalf. J. R. R. Tolkien."

Tolkien died on 2 September 1973, and Hill arranged for the poem to be published shortly afterwards. When she herself died in 1991, the poem's copyright was bequeathed to the Order of the Holy Paraclete, an Anglican educational foundation.

== The text ==
The poem comprises three stanzas, each containing four rhyming couplets. It is a dramatic lyric that the hobbit Bilbo Baggins is supposed to have composed as he contemplated his approaching death – a nunc dimittis that could have been, but was not, incorporated into the final chapter of The Lord of the Rings. The context of Bilbo's making of the poem is that he, the hobbits Frodo and Sam and the elves Elrond and Galadriel have travelled to Mithlond, the Grey Havens, where they have been met by the elvish shipwright Círdan and the wizard Gandalf. Bilbo, Frodo, Elrond, Galadriel and Gandalf are preparing to board the elven ship that will carry them magically away from the mortal world of Middle-earth to the Undying Lands beyond the sunset. Bilbo's verses acknowledge the ending of his day and the dimming of his eyes, bid farewell to the friends whom he will leave behind and look forward to the Lonely Star's guiding him to "west of West", "where night is quiet and sleep is rest".

Little is known about the poem's development. According to Christina Scull and Wayne G. Hammond, it began as early as the 1920s or 1930s in a composition in Old Norse titled Vestr um haf – "West over sea". As Scull and Hammond point out, the poem cannot have reached its final form until after Tolkien had conceived how The Lord of the Rings would conclude. A progress report on the writing of the book that Tolkien sent to his son Christopher on 29 November 1944 shows that the coda of his story had taken shape in his mind long before it was published in 1955: "The final scene will be the passage of Bilbo and Elrond and Galadriel through the woods of the Shire on their way to the Grey Havens. Frodo will join them and pass over the Sea." (Note: Tolkien, J. R. R.: The Letters of J. R. R. Tolkien; Allen & Unwin, 1981; p. 104)

== Precursors and parallels ==
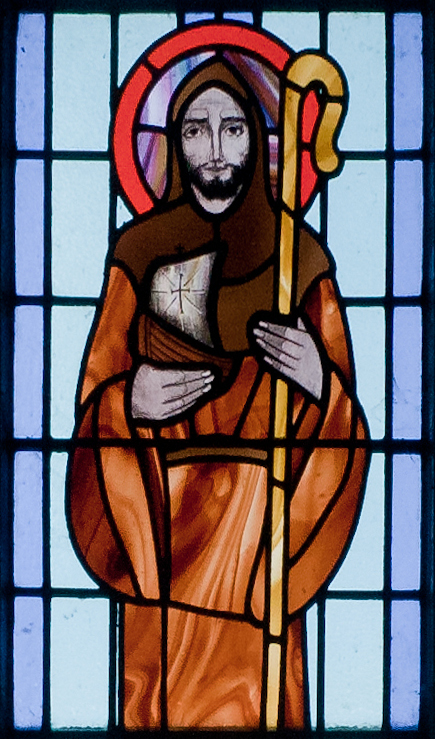
The Navigator-monk St Brendan at St Benin's Church, Kilbannen. In his 1955 poem Imram, Tolkien sends Brendan past Númenor to Aman, bringing him home to die in Ireland. (Note: Tolkien, J. R. R.: Sauron Defeated; Harper Collins, 1992; pp. 296–299)

Bilbo's voyage to the Undying Lands is reminiscent of several other journeys in English literature. Scull and Hammond observe that Bilbo's Last Song is somewhat like Tennyson's Crossing the Bar (1889), a sixteen-line religious lyric (sharing some of Tolkien's poem's vocabulary) in which a sea voyage is a metaphor for a faithful death. Other precursors of Tolkien's poem are the legend of the carrying of the wounded King Arthur to the magical isle of Avalon and the quest of Reepicheep to sail to the holy country of the divine lion Aslan in Tolkien's friend C. S. Lewis's The Voyage of the Dawn Treader.

Bilbo's Otherworld journey has further parallels in writings of Tolkien's own. The figure of the mortal who sails from the quotidian world to a paradise beyond the sea is a motif that recurs in Tolkien's poems and stories throughout his creative life. Examples are Roverandom, Eriol in The Book of Lost Tales, (Note: Tolkien, J. R. R.: The Book of Lost Tales, Part One; Allen & Unwin, 1983; passim) Tuor in Quenta Silmarillion, (Note: Tolkien, J. R. R.: The Silmarillion; Allen & Unwin, 1977; p. 245) Ar-Pharazôn in Akallabêth, (Note: Tolkien, J. R. R.: The Silmarillion; p. 278) Ælfwine in The Lost Road, (Note: Tolkien, J. R. R.: The Lost Road and Other Writings; Unwin Hyman, 1987; p. 44) St Brendan in Imram, Sam and Gimli in The Lord of the Rings (Note: Tolkien, J. R. R.: The Lord of the Rings, 50th anniversary edition; Harper Collins, 2005; pp. 1097–1098) and the narrator of "The Sea-Bell" in The Adventures of Tom Bombadil. (Note: Tolkien, J. R. R.: The Adventures of Tom Bombadil; Allen & Unwin, 1962; pp. 57–60)

== Publication history ==
Bilbo's Last Song first appeared at the end of 1973, translated into Dutch by Max Schuchart for a limited edition of two thousand numbered posters that the publisher Het Spectrum distributed as corporate New Year's gifts. In April 1974, Houghton Mifflin published the poem in the US as a poster decorated with a photograph of a river taken by Robert Strindberg. In September 1974, Allen & Unwin published the poem in the UK as a poster illustrated by Pauline Baynes. Her painting depicts the hobbits Sam, Merry and Pippin looking down on the Grey Havens and watching Bilbo's ship sailing down the firth of Lune.

In 1990, the poem was issued as a 32-page full colour hardcover picture-book illustrated with almost fifty of Baynes's paintings – the largest body of work that she created for any Tolkien project – by Unwin Hyman in the UK and by Houghton Mifflin in the US. (Note: Tolkien, J. R. R.: Bilbo's Last Song; Unwin Hyman, 1990) A second hardcover edition was published in 2002 by Hutchinson in the UK and by Alfred A. Knopf in the US. (Note: Tolkien, J. R. R.: Bilbo's Last Song; Hutchinson, 2002) A large-format paperback edition was published in both the UK and the US by Red Fox Picture Books in 2012. (Note: Tolkien, J. R. R.: Bilbo's Last Song; Red Fox, 2012) The second and third editions of the poem omitted some of the illustrations published in the first. Translations of the poem have appeared in Finnish, French, German, Italian, Japanese, Portuguese, Russian, Spanish and Swedish.

== Pauline Baynes's illustrations ==
The endpapers of Unwin Hyman's and Houghton Mifflin's 1990 edition of Bilbo's Last Song show Bilbo, Elrond, Galadriel and Gildor riding with a company of elves through an autumnal landscape, watched by a variety of woodland creatures. The text of the poem is then presented in twelve full-colour two-page spreads, each dedicated to a single couplet. The couplets are printed on the verso pages, each with a unique illuminated first letter and with a unique painting of a reposing Bilbo beneath. The recto pages present roundels narrating Bilbo's journey from retirement in Rivendell to his arrival at "fields and mountains ever blest": Bilbo is seen at his desk, looking out across the ravine of the Bruinen, talking to Elrond, mounting his horse, riding through the Shire, crossing Woody End, arriving at the Far Downs, meeting Círdan and Gandalf, hugging Sam, greeting Merry and Pippin, setting sail and nearing the Undying Lands. Each roundel is framed by a unique pair of overarching trees, beneath, on and above which are a multitude of birds and beasts: a beaver, a fox, an otter, badgers, bats, frogs, hedgehogs, mice, rabbits, squirrels, stoats, toads, a blackbird, a crow, a dove, a gull, a magpie, a wader, a woodpecker, some owls and many others. At the foot of every page, both verso and recto, is a vignette that depicts a scene from the adventures of Bilbo that Tolkien had told in The Hobbit. Baynes's twenty-six Hobbit paintings illustrate many scenes not represented in Tolkien's own Hobbit art, including, for example, the dwarves' feast in Bag End and their meetings with Elrond and Thranduil, Bilbo's finding of the One Ring and his conversation with Gollum, Bilbo's and Gandalf's meeting with Beorn, Bilbo's fight with the spiders of Mirkwood and the Battle of Five Armies. Anonymous notes at the back of the book key Baynes's paintings to the passages in The Hobbit and The Lord of the Rings which they illustrate.

Hutchinson's and Knopf's 2002 edition of the poem is broadly similar to Unwin Hyman's and Houghton Mifflin's earlier version, allocating each of Tolkien's couplets its own two-page spread and including most of Baynes's 1990 artwork. However, it omits all but one of Baynes's pictures of Bilbo at rest, and it switches her arcing trees from recto pages to verso to frame Tolkien's couplets rather than her roundels. Red Fox's large paperback edition of 2012 restores the material and design that Hutchinson and Knopf reject, but omits the endpaper painting that decorates its predecessors.

== Adaptations ==
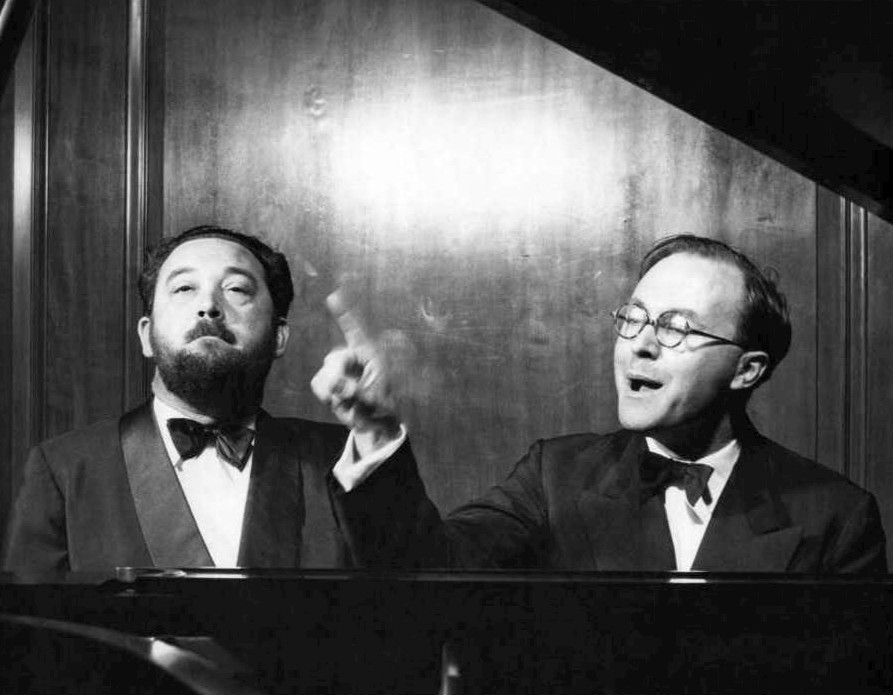
Donald Swann (right) in revue with Michael Flanders on Broadway in 1959

The first composer to set Bilbo's Last Song to music was Tolkien's fan and friend Donald Swann, who had earlier set six of Tolkien's other poems for their 1967 song-book The Road Goes Ever On. (Note: Tolkien, J. R. R. and Swann, Donald: The Road Goes Ever On; Allen & Unwin, 1968) Swann wrote about Bilbo's Last Song in his autobiography. "The lyric was handed to me at Tolkien's funeral by his dedicated secretary, Joy Hill, who is a close friend and neighbour of mine in Battersea. I was stirred up that day and went off and wrote a tune for it, to be sung as a duet, although I often perform it solo... The tune is based on a song from the Isle of Man ... [and] also resembles a Cephallonian Greek melody." Swann's setting of the poem – his favourite among his Tolkien compositions – was added to The Road Goes Ever On for its second (1978) and third (2002) editions. The latter included a CD on which Swann performed his song with William Elvin and Clive McCrombie. The song was also recorded on Swann's album Alphabetaphon (1990) and John Amis's album Amiscellany (2002)

In 1981, Brian Sibley and Michael Bakewell used Bilbo's Last Song to conclude the dramatization of The Lord of the Rings that they wrote for BBC Radio 4. The poem was set to music by Stephen Oliver, who had provided all the music for the series. The first stanza was chanted by John Le Mesurier as Bilbo, the second was omitted and the third was sung by the boy soprano Matthew Vine. An album of Oliver's music from the series included a version of the song in which Vine sang all three stanzas. Oliver's version was recorded by the Dutch Tolkien Society band The Hobbitons for their 1996 CD J. R. R. Tolkien's Songs from Middle-earth.

Peter Jackson did not follow Sibley's and Bakewell's example when adapting The Lord of the Rings for the cinema. His 2003 movie The Lord of the Rings: The Return of the King concludes not with Bilbo's Last Song but with Into the West, a song similar in mood to Oliver's written by Fran Walsh, Annie Lennox and Howard Shore, and performed by Lennox over the movie's closing credits. A Howard Shore composition for choir and orchestra called Bilbo's Song accompanies part of the Fan Club Credits on home media releases of The Return of the King's Extended Edition, but this has nothing to do with Bilbo's Last Song; its text is a translation into Tolkien's invented Sindarin of his poem I Sit Beside the Fire and Think.

== Critical reception ==
Tom Shippey brackets Bilbo's Last Song with Tolkien's late, elegiac short story Smith of Wootton Major and with his valedictory address to the University of Oxford. "[Bilbo's] words could, ... entirely appropriately for myth, be removed from their 'Grey Havens' context and be heard as the words of a dying man: but one dying contented with his life and what he had achieved, and confident of the existence of a world and a fate beyond Middle-earth."

Brian Rosebury judges the text of the poem to be banal and its couplets technically inept. He suggests that Tolkien would have been wiser to allow Bilbo's final poetic utterance to be the version of his song The Road Goes Ever On that he recites by the fireside in his room in Rivendell near the end of The Return of the King. (Note: Tolkien, J. R. R.: The Lord of the Rings, 50th anniversary edition; Harper Collins, 2005; p. 987)
