= A Map of Middle-earth =

Fictional map

Pauline Baynes's "iconic" 1970 poster-map of Middle-earth

"A Map of Middle-earth" is either of two colour posters by different artists, Barbara Remington and Pauline Baynes. Adapted from Tolkien's maps, they depict the north-western region of the fictional continent of Middle-earth. They were published in 1965 and 1970 by the American and British publishers of J. R. R. Tolkien's book The Lord of the Rings. The poster map by Baynes has been described as "iconic".

== Origins ==
All maps of Middle-earth derive ultimately from J. R. R. Tolkien's own working maps, which he constantly annotated over the years, whether in English or in Elvish. He was unable to find the time to bring them into a presentable state in time for the publication of The Lord of the Rings. The task was delegated to his son Christopher. Neither of the maps known as "A Map of Middle-earth" cover the whole continent of Middle-earth; instead they portray the north-western region of that continent at the end of the Third Age, where the story of The Lord of the Rings takes place.

Jonathan Crowe, writing on TOR.com, describes Christopher Tolkien's cartography as hugely influential on fantasy literature, setting the norm for "epic fantasy novels" which "were supposed to come with maps".

== Barbara Remington ==
The earlier poster, signed "BRem" (Barbara Remington), was published in 1965 by Ballantine Books. It features border images adapted from Remington's cover designs for the 1965 Ballantine paperback edition of The Lord of the Rings. Remington had not read the novel before designing the cover illustrations.

Barbara Remington's 1965 map with its coloured border illustrations

== Pauline Baynes ==
The second version, by Pauline Baynes, was published in 1970 by George Allen & Unwin in the UK and by Ballantine Books in the USA. It features ten small inset illustrations of important locations from the story. The poster is framed at the top by a row of nine figures representing the members of the "Fellowship of the Ring" setting out on their quest. At the bottom is an array of antagonists from the novel, including the nine Black Riders, Gollum, Shelob, and various Orcs. The poster has become iconic. Tolkien liked Baynes's illustrative style to an extent, but felt that it was too decorative to be used directly to illustrate the narrative of The Lord of the Rings. He was however pleased with at least some of her vignettes on the poster map.

Baynes's poster map helped to make the capital letter-only Uncial script the standard for Middle-earth maps.

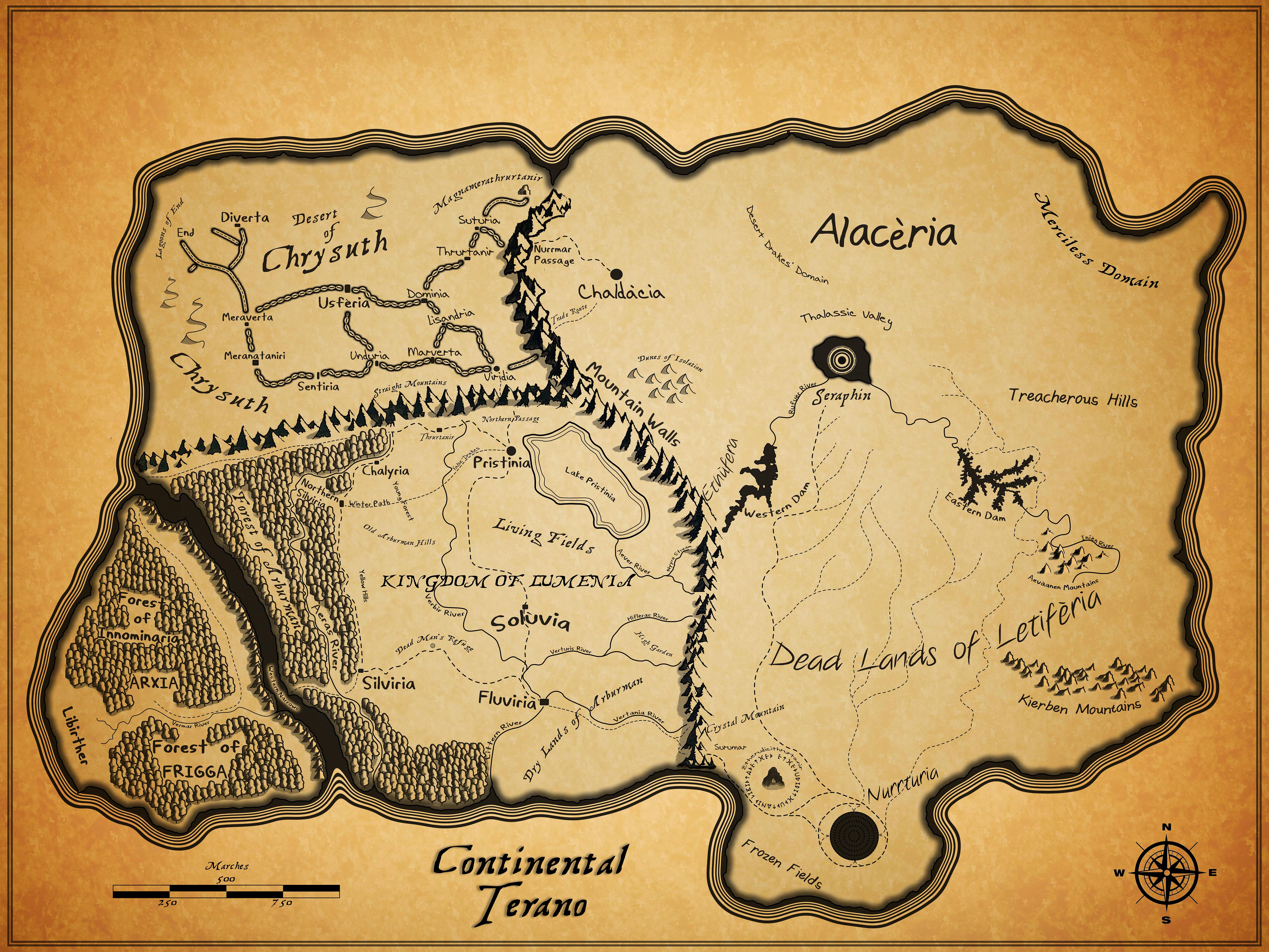
Many later fantasy maps were influenced in style by the maps of Middle-earth.

In 1971, Baynes created another map for Allen and Unwin, entitled There and Back Again: A Map of Bilbo's Journey Through Eriador and Rhovanion. It covers Bilbo's complete journey in The Hobbit, including the parts west of the Misty Mountains, and was based on Tolkien's map of Middle-earth.

== Sources ==
- Carpenter, Humphrey, ed. (2023) [1981]. The Letters of J. R. R. Tolkien: Revised and Expanded Edition. New York: Harper Collins. ISBN 978-0-35-865298-4.
- Hammond, Wayne G.; Scull, Christina (2006b). The J.R.R. Tolkien Companion and Guide: Reader's Guide. London: HarperCollins. ISBN 0-007-14918-2.
