= Barbara Remington =

American artist (1929–2020)

Barbara Remington with artwork

Barbara Remington (23 June 1929 – 23 January 2020) was an American artist and illustrator. Born in Minnesota, she was probably best known for her cover-art for Ballantine Books' first paperback editions of J. R. R. Tolkien's novels The Hobbit and The Lord of the Rings and for her Tolkien-related poster A Map of Middle-earth.

== Career ==
Remington's covers for the three books were designed as one large painting with three sections. In an interview about her association with Tolkien's works, Remington mentions that she had not been able to get hold of the books before making the illustration, and had only a sketchy idea from friends what they were about. Tolkien, the author, could not understand why her illustration included what he thought were pumpkins in a tree, or why a lion appeared at all (the lions were removed from the cover of later editions). Remington became a huge Tolkien fan, and would have "definitely drawn different pictures" had she read the books first.

The popularity of the artwork led to a successful jigsaw puzzle of the combined covers and a large edition of the poster, as well as work for similar genre fiction such as The Worm Ouroboros by E. R. Eddison. She also illustrated a number of children's books.

Remington illustrated "Scuttle The Stowaway Mouse", written by Jean and Nancy Soule in 1969. This is a great example of Remington's ability to understand and transform the characters into her own. Her imagination and eye for every small detail is impeccable. Remington wrote and illustrated the children's book “Boat” in 1975. Beautifully drawn with incredible attention to details. All done in pencil and ink.

Remington died at her home in Thompson, Pennsylvania, on January 23, 2020. She was 90 years old.
