= Pauline Baynes =

English illustrator of children's books (1922–2008)

- Portrait, c. 1974
- Born: Pauline Diana Baynes; 9 September 1922; Hove, Sussex, England
- Died: 1 August 2008 (aged 85); Dockenfield, Surrey, England
- Education: Slade School of Fine Art
- Known for: Illustration, mainly children's books
- Notable work: The Chronicles of Narnia; A Map of Middle-earth
- Spouse: Fritz Gasch (m. 1961; died 1988)
- Awards: Kate Greenaway Medal; 1968

Pauline Diana Baynes (9 September 1922 – 1 August 2008) was an English illustrator, author, and commercial artist. She contributed drawings and paintings to more than 200 books, mostly in the children's genre. She was the first illustrator of some of J. R. R. Tolkien's minor works, including Farmer Giles of Ham, Smith of Wootton Major, and The Adventures of Tom Bombadil. She became well known for her cover illustrations for The Hobbit and The Lord of the Rings, and for her poster map with inset illustrations, A Map of Middle-earth. She illustrated all seven volumes of C. S. Lewis's Chronicles of Narnia, from the first book, The Lion, the Witch and the Wardrobe. Gaining a reputation as the "Narnia artist", she illustrated spinoffs like Brian Sibley's The Land of Narnia. In addition to work for other authors, including illustrating Roger Lancelyn Green's The Tales of Troy and Iona and Peter Opie's books of nursery rhymes, Baynes created some 600 illustrations for Grant Uden's A Dictionary of Chivalry, for which she won the Kate Greenaway Medal. Late in her life she began to write and illustrate her own books, with animal or Biblical themes.

== Early life ==
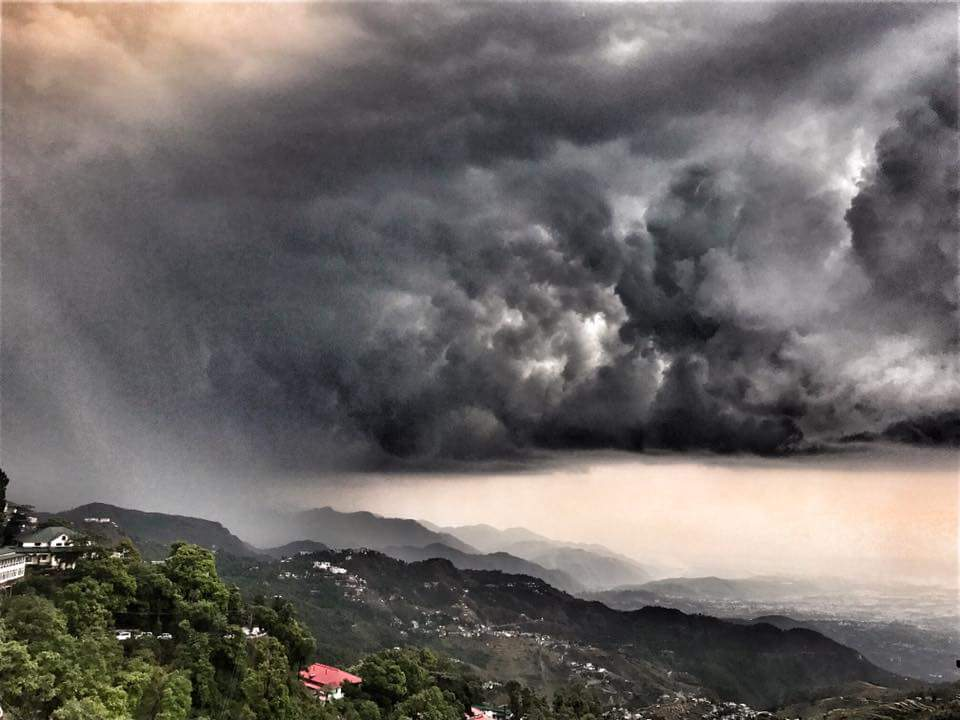
Even in her old age, Baynes never forgot the sights and sounds of Mussoorie.

Baynes was born on 9 September 1922 at 67 Brunswick Place, Hove, East Sussex, England. Her father was Frederick William Wilberforce Baynes (1887–1967) and her mother was Jessie Harriet Maude Baynes, née Cunningham (c. 1888–1958). Her only sibling was her elder sister, Angela Mary Baynes. While she was still a baby, her family went to India, where her father had been appointed District Officer in the British Imperial Indian Civil Service, serving as a First Class Magistrate. The Bayneses divided their time between the city of Agra and a refuge from the midsummer heat in the hill town of Mussoorie; Baynes was happy in her expatriate infancy.

When she was five, her mother, who was in poor health, left Baynes's father, taking both her daughters back to England. Baynes recalled crying herself to sleep on her journey home. The three returnees lived a nomadic life in Surrey, lodging with various friends and renting a series of rooms in boarding houses. Baynes's father stayed behind in India, licensed by his wife to feel "free to do as he pleased", but regularly rejoined his family for holidays in Switzerland.

== Education ==
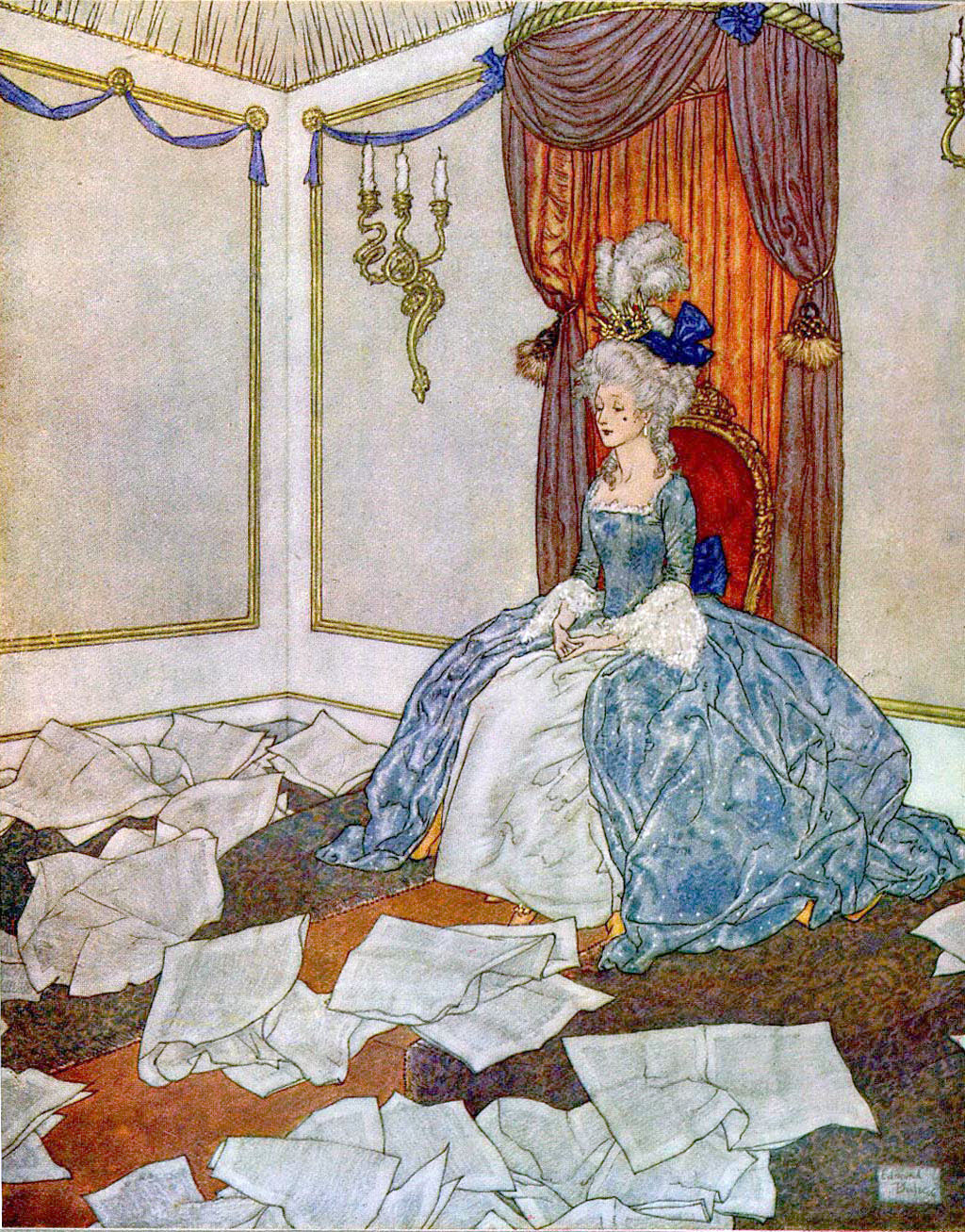
An illustration by Edmund Dulac, one of Baynes's inspirations

Baynes began her education at a convent school, where the nuns who taught her mocked her fantastical imagination, her homemade clothes and her ability to speak Hindi. Her unhappiness over their bullying was slightly mitigated when she learned that Rudyard Kipling, whom she admired, had experienced something similar. When she was nine, she was sent to Beaufront School, an independent girls' boarding school in Camberley. Her favourite subject there was art, "because it was easy". By the time that she left, she had formed the ambition of becoming an illustrator. She liked Beaufront well enough to go back to it as a schoolmistress for two years in her mid-twenties. At fifteen, she followed her sister to the Farnham School of Art (now subsumed into the University for the Creative Arts). She spent two terms studying design, which was to become the foundation of her mature technique.

At nineteen, again like her sister, she won a place at the Slade School of Fine Art, just as it left its usual premises on the Gower Street campus of University College London to begin a period of wartime cohabitation with the Ruskin School of Drawing in Oxford University. Studying the work of the illustrators Gustave Doré, Edmund Dulac, Arthur Rackham, Ernest Shepard, R. S. Sherriffs, Rex Whistler, Jacques-Marie-Gaston Onfroy de Bréville ("Job") and the anonymous illuminators of mediaeval manuscripts, she became certain that she had a vocation to follow in their footsteps. She was not a diligent student, spending time on "coffee and parties", and she left the Slade without a qualification. She did, however, achieve the distinction, one shared with her sister, of exhibiting at the Royal Academy of Arts, in 1939.

== War work and early career ==
In 1940, a year into World War II, both Baynes sisters joined the Women's Voluntary Service. The WVS sent them to the Camouflage Development Training Centre that the Royal Engineers had set up in Farnham Castle, where the sisters were put to work making models to be used as teaching aids. One of their colleagues at the centre was Powell Perry, whose family owned a company that published picture books for children. It was Perry who gave Baynes her first professional commissions. Among the Perry Colour Books to which she contributed were Question Mark, Wild Flower Rhymes and a novelization of the libretto of Mozart's opera The Magic Flute.

From 1942 until the end of the war, the Baynes sisters worked in the Admiralty Hydrographic Department in Bath, making maps and marine charts for the Royal Navy. This experience stood Baynes in good stead in later life, when she created maps of C. S. Lewis's Narnia and J. R. R. Tolkien's Middle-earth. A letter that she wrote to a friend at this time included a sketch that he passed on to Frank Whittaker, an employee of Country Life. Her friend's kindness resulted in commissions from the magazine to illustrate three books of fairy stories by Victoria Stevenson.

== Illustrating J. R. R. Tolkien ==
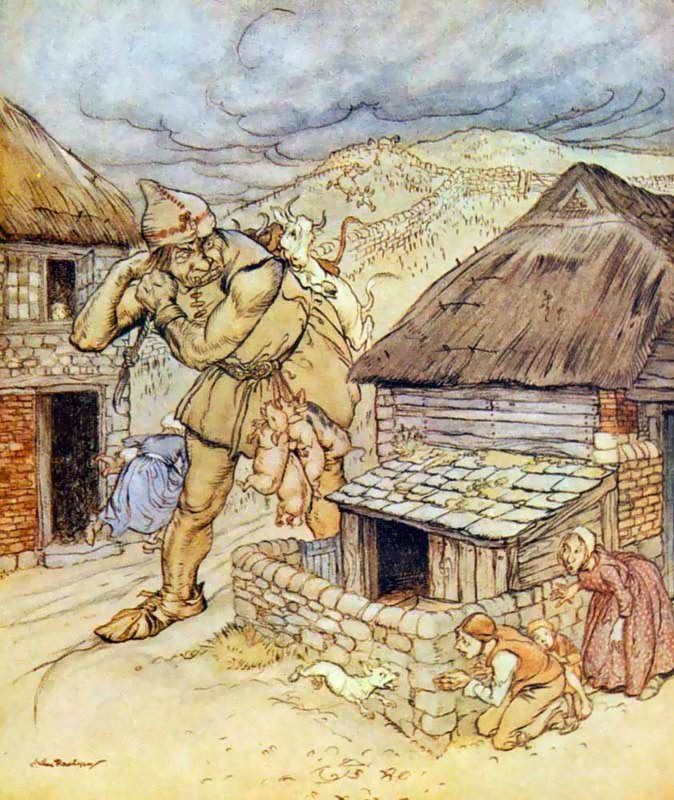
An illustration by Arthur Rackham. In 1961, Tolkien urged Baynes to "avoid the Scylla of Blyton and the Charybdis of Rackham - though to go to wreck on the latter would be the less evil fate".

=== Farmer Giles of Ham ===
In 1948, after briefly teaching at Beaufort, Baynes sought to develop her career by writing a book of her own – Victoria and the Golden Bird, a fantasy about a girl's magical visits to far-off countries – and by trying to secure work from a major London publisher. She sent Allen & Unwin a suite of comic reinterpretations of marginalia from the mediaeval Luttrell Psalter. J. R. R. Tolkien, author of Allen & Unwin's children's book The Hobbit, had recently offered the firm a mock-medieval comic novella called Farmer Giles of Ham. They had commissioned illustrations for the story from Milein Cosman, which Tolkien had disliked. On 5 August 1948, he complained to Ronald Eames, the publisher's art director, that they were "wholly out of keeping with the style or manner of the text". Five days later, Eames wrote to Baynes requesting specimen drawings for "an adult fairy story (complete with dragon and giant!)" that would require "some historical and topographical (Oxford and Wales) realism". Baynes reassured Eames that she knew Oxford from having sketched there, and knew Wales from having picked Welsh potatoes. Visiting Allen & Unwin's offices to see what Baynes had produced for him, Tolkien was won over to her cause by the images. "They are more than illustrations", he wrote to Allen & Unwin on 16 March 1949, "they are a collateral theme. I showed them to my friends whose polite comment was that they reduced my text to a commentary on the drawings."

Tolkien was so pleased that on 20 December 1949, he wrote to her expressing the wish that she would one day illustrate two other books that he was working on – the tales that eventually became The Lord of the Rings and The Silmarillion. Tolkien's publishers thought differently, preferring to have his books illustrated by Alan Lee, Francis Mosley, Ted Nasmith and Margrethe II of Denmark. Ultimately, Tolkien decided that Baynes was not the right artist to illustrate his major works, judging that they needed pictures "more noble or awe-inspiring" than she could produce.

=== The Adventures of Tom Bombadil ===
Baynes's illustration The Hoard for J. R. R. Tolkien's 1962 book The Adventures of Tom Bombadil. The image was Baynes's favourite among the book's illustrations, but it disappointed Tolkien as he felt both the figures were implausible: the knight should have had a shield and helmet, while the dragon should have been watching the cave's entrance.

In 1961 Tolkien turned to Baynes again when he was compiling an anthology of some of his shorter pieces of verse. "You seem able to produce wonderful pictures with a touch of 'fantasy'", he wrote on 6 December, "but primarily bright and clear visions of things that one might actually see". The Adventures of Tom Bombadil, featuring some of Baynes's most delicate and meticulous imagery, was published in 1962. Baynes told Tolkien that her favourite among the book's poems was The Hoard; only much later did she learn that her illustration for that particular poem had disappointed him – she had drawn a dragon facing away from the mouth of its cave and a knight without either a shield or a helmet, which he had thought looked implausible. He would also have preferred Tom Bombadil to have been shown on the front of the book rather than on the back, a wish which HarperCollins eventually granted when the book was reprinted in a pocket edition in 2014.

=== Cover art for The Hobbit and The Lord of the Rings ===
In 1961 Puffin used a painting by Baynes for the cover of a paperback edition of The Hobbit. Three years later, Allen & Unwin published The Lord of the Rings in a three-volume deluxe hardback edition for which they asked Baynes to design a slipcase. Never having read the story, Baynes was faced with the prospect of having to read a thousand pages of narrative before picking up a brush. Her sister, who knew the book well, rescued her from her predicament by painting a panorama of Tolkien's characters and locales that Baynes was able to borrow from. The triptych that Baynes created became one of the most widely reproduced of all her paintings, being recycled for the iconic cover art of a one-volume paperback edition of The Lord of the Rings in 1968 and a three-volume Unwin Paperbacks version in 1981. Baynes also created an image of Aragorn's standard that was used to promote The Return of the King in a newspaper advertisement in October 1955.

=== Smith of Wootton Major ===
In 1967 Baynes illustrated the last piece of Tolkien's fiction to be published in his lifetime, his allegorical short story Smith of Wootton Major. Ballantine's American edition of the book was issued with an alternative Baynes cover. Yet another cover appeared when the book was reissued in the United Kingdom in 1975 in a second edition that was uniform with The Adventures of Tom Bombadil. Her illustrations were also used in an edition published in 2005 that was edited by Verlyn Flieger and included additional material written by scholars of Tolkien's work.

=== Maps of Middle-earth ===
In 1969, while waiting for Tolkien to finish The Silmarillion, Allen & Unwin commissioned Baynes to paint a map of his Middle-earth. Tolkien supplied her with copies of the several, variously scaled graph paper charts that he had made in the course of writing The Lord of the Rings, and annotated her copy of the map that his son Christopher had produced for The Fellowship of the Ring in 1954. Her working Fellowship map, scribbled over with new place names and some barely legible notes on latitudes, ships, trees, horses, elephants and camels, was bought by Oxford's Bodleian Library in 2016 for roughly £60,000.

With the help of cartographers from the Bordon military camp in Hampshire, Baynes created A Map of Middle-earth that Allen & Unwin published as a poster in 1970. It was decorated with a header and footer showing some of Tolkien's characters, and with vignettes of some of the places described in The Lord of the Rings. Tolkien wrote that her ideas of the Teeth of Mordor, the Argonath, Barad-dûr and, especially, Minas Morgul were very similar to his own, although he was less happy with her images of his heroes and their enemies. A companion map for The Hobbit, entitled There and Back Again: a Map of Bilbo's Journey Through Eriador and Rhovanion, was published by Allen & Unwin in 1971. Both maps became famous.

=== Bilbo's Last Song ===
In 1974, a year after Tolkien's death, Allen & Unwin published his poem Bilbo's Last Song as Baynes's third and final Tolkien poster. Her painting showed a scene that Tolkien described in the closing pages of The Lord of the Rings: Sam, Merry and Pippin stand at the Grey Havens, watching an elvish ship carrying Frodo, Bilbo, Elrond, Galadriel and Gandalf away from Middle-earth to the land of Aman. In 1990, the poem was reissued as a book with three parallel sequences of Baynes's paintings: one illustrating Bilbo's journey from Rivendell to the Undying Lands, one showing Bilbo in various states of repose, and one depicting the events narrated in The Hobbit. Some of the illustrations were omitted when the book was reissued by other publishers twelve years later.

=== Other works ===
In 1978 Baynes painted a cover for a paperback edition of Tolkien's translations of Sir Gawain and the Green Knight, Pearl and Sir Orfeo. In 1980 Allen & Unwin published Poems and Stories, a de luxe, boxed, single-volume anthology of several of Tolkien's shorter works. The book featured new illustrations by Baynes for the short story Leaf by Niggle, the verse drama The Homecoming of Beorhtnoth Beorhthelm's Son, Farmer Giles of Ham, The Adventures of Tom Bombadil and Smith of Wootton Major. It also included all of Baynes's original illustrations for the latter three titles, some revised with grey and orange tinting. Baynes used the opportunity provided by revisiting Tom Bombadil to rework her illustration for The Hoard to make its dragon and knight look the way Tolkien had wanted them to.

In 1999, half a century after her collaboration with Tolkien had begun, Baynes returned to Farmer Giles of Ham once again to add a map of the story's Little Kingdom. The book was published with the revised cover that Baynes had painted for its second edition in 1976. It was reissued with a modified version of this cover when it was published in a pocket-sized edition in 2014. Baynes's final Tolkien art was published in 2003, when an audiobook of Smith of Wootton Major and Leaf by Niggle was issued with a CD insert showing an image of Niggle painting his Great Tree that had been commissioned from Baynes in the 1970s but had remained unpublished.

== Illustrating C. S. Lewis ==
=== The Chronicles of Narnia ===
C. S. Lewis, seeking a suitable artist who could draw children and animals, felt that Baynes would meet the requirement. Here, she shows the children being drawn in to a painting of the Dawn Treader and the enchanted world of Narnia. She illustrated all seven Narnia books.

When C. S. Lewis was sixteen, he conceived the idea of a faun walking through a snowy forest carrying an umbrella and some parcels. In 1949, after ten years of false starts, he finally completed a story about the country where the faun lived – the land of Narnia, where it was always winter but never Christmas. A close friend of Tolkien's, Lewis chose Baynes to illustrate his tale after enjoying her artwork for Farmer Giles of Ham, encouraged also by a bookshop assistant. Baynes signed a contract with Lewis's publisher, Geoffrey Bles, in 1949, and delivered drawings, a coloured frontispiece and a cover design for the book the following year. The Lion, the Witch and the Wardrobe was published in 1950. At Lewis's request, Baynes went on to illustrate all six of the book's sequels – Prince Caspian: the Return to Narnia (1951), The Voyage of the Dawn Treader (1952), The Silver Chair (1953), The Horse and His Boy (1954), The Magician's Nephew (1955) and The Last Battle (1956). Too unworldly to negotiate the royalties deal that would have made her a multi-millionaire, Baynes sold her work to Lewis's publishers for a flat fee of just £100 per book. Lewis commented that her work had done much to make the Narnia books popular and she became increasingly linked to the series and known as the "Narnia artist", a title she retained for much of her career.

Baynes revisited The Chronicles of Narnia several times. When the books were issued as Puffin paperbacks between 1959 and 1965, Baynes created new covers for them, and slipcase artwork. In the 1970s, she created a third set of covers for hardback editions by The Bodley Head and Collins. In 1991, HarperCollins published a special edition of The Lion, the Witch and the Wardrobe with seventeen new paintings, and in 1998 they commemorated the centenary of Lewis's birth by reissuing the complete Chronicles with all Baynes's line illustrations tinted by her in watercolour. In 2000, HarperCollins published a 50th anniversary edition of The Lion, the Witch and the Wardrobe including all Baynes's illustrations and her 1968 colour poster map of Narnia.

=== C. S. Lewis on Baynes ===
Lewis met Baynes only three times – at his publisher's office, at a lunch party at Magdalen College in 1949 and at the Charing Cross Hotel in London in 1951. He found her "good and beautiful and sensitive". In his letters to Baynes, he praised her effusively. Her drawings were "really excellent" with a "wealth of vigorous detail". She did "each book a little bit better than the last". When she congratulated him on winning the Carnegie literary award for The Last Battle, he replied "is it not really 'our' Medal? I'm sure the illustrations were taken into consideration as well as the text." Sometimes, though, he was frank about her technical limitations. "If only you cd. take 6 months off and devote them to anatomy, there's no limit to your possibilities", he wrote.

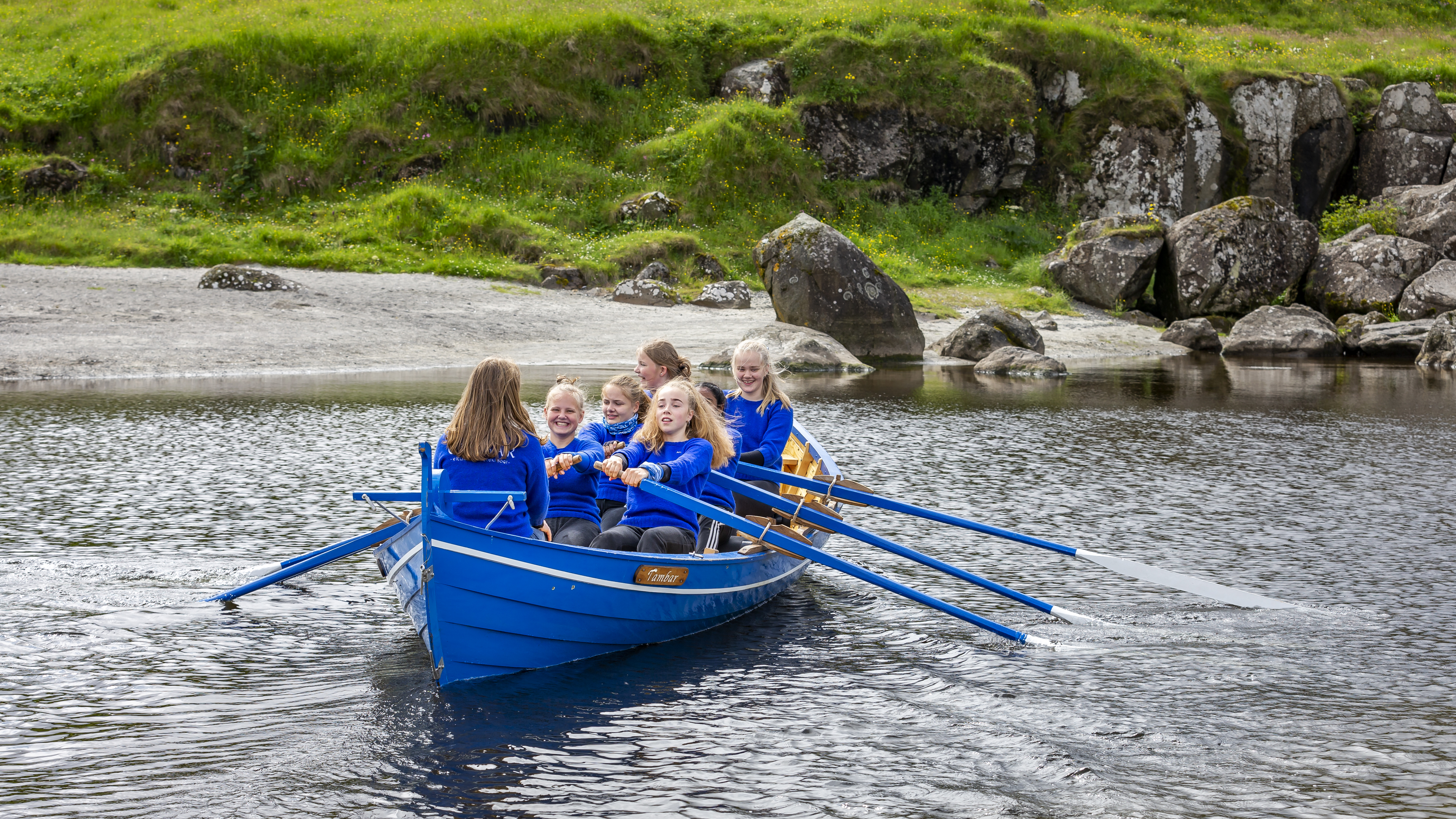
Lewis recorded that he had difficulty convincing Baynes that "rowers face aft" in a boat, not forwards.

According to Lewis, she had "Magna virtutes nec minora vitia" – great virtues, but vices no less great. He felt that the faces of her children were often "empty, expressionless and too alike", and that she could not draw lions. Indeed, "In quadrupeds claudicat" (she limps); he wrote that she would profit from a visit to a zoo. He noted that a knight was wearing his shield on his right arm instead of his left. "What", he asked I. O. Evans, "is one to do with illustrators – especially if, like, mine, they are timid, shrinking young women who, when criticized, look as if you'd pulled their hair or given them a black eye? My resolution was exhausted by the time I'd convinced her that rowers face aft not (as she thinks) forward."

Lewis told his friend Dorothy L. Sayers that "The main trouble about Pauline B. is ... her total ignorance of animal anatomy. In the v. last book she has at last learned how to draw a horse. I have always had serious reservations about her ... But she had merits (her botanical forms are lovely), she needed the work (old mother to support, I think), and worst of all she is such a timid creature, so 'easily put down' that criticism cd. only be hinted ... At any real reprimand she'd have thrown up the job, not in a huff but in sheer, downright, unresenting, pusillanimous dejection. She is quite a good artist on a certain formal-fantastic level (did Tolkien's Farmer Giles far better than my books) but has no interest in matter – how boats are rowed, or bows shot with, or feet planted, or fists clenched. Arabesque [decoration] is really her vocation." Sayers in turn was scathing about Baynes's work.

=== Baynes on C. S. Lewis ===
Lewis made little impression on Baynes in their meetings. They corresponded little; she found him "kindly and tolerant", charming and polite. In 1962, she sent him an aptly Narnian Christmas present; he replied that he appreciated her "enduring White Witch even more than the transitory joys of the Turkish Delight." Much later, she learnt from a 1988 biography of Lewis that he had complained about her behind her back. "One doesn't need to have liked him to admire him", she told her confidante Charlotte Cory. "He never became a friend." Baynes's feelings about Lewis's books were conflicted too. She thought his stories "marvellous", but, even though she was a Christian, she was uncomfortable with their Christian subtext. She claimed not to have identified the lion Aslan with Christ until after she had finished work on The Last Battle, despite having drawn him standing upright like a man in The Lion, the Witch and the Wardrobe. She regretted that her Narnian art had overshadowed the rest of her work and she was ruefully aware that a book collector would pay more for a first edition of The Lion, the Witch and the Wardrobe than she had been paid for illustrating it.

== Other artwork ==
Baynes contributed to Narnia spinoffs. Brian Sibley's The Land of Narnia, including many new paintings and drawings, appeared in 1989. In 1994, James Riordan's A Book of Narnians provided a portrait gallery of Narnia's dramatis personae. Among others of Baynes's Lewisiana were Douglas Gresham's The Official Narnia Cookbook, The Magical Land of Narnia Puzzle Book, Sibley and Alison Sage's A Treasury of Narnians, The Narnia Trivia Book, The Wisdom of Narnia and Narnia Chronology.

The illustrations of which Baynes was most proud were the almost six hundred that she created for Grant Uden's A Dictionary of Chivalry, on which she laboured for nearly two years. They won her the Chartered Institute of Library and Information Professionals' Kate Greenaway Medal for the best book illustrations of 1968. In 1972, Baynes achieved a runner-up's commendation in the Greenaway competition with her illustrations for Helen Piers's Snail and Caterpillar. Among the other books in her bibliography are works by Richard Adams, Hans Christian Andersen, Enid Blyton, Rumer Godden, Roger Lancelyn Green, Jacob and Wilhelm Grimm, Rudyard Kipling, George MacDonald, Mary Norton, her friends Iona and Peter Opie, Beatrix Potter, Arthur Ransome, Alison Uttley and Amabel Williams-Ellis. Several of her commissions were the result of the bond that she formed with Puffin Books' Kaye Webb. Baynes contributed artwork to many magazines, including Holly Leaves, Lilliput, Puffin Post, The Sphere, The Tatler and The Illustrated London News; she had been introduced to The Illustrated London News by another of its artists, her friend and mentor Ernest Shepard. Stationery companies commissioned her to design Christmas cards – some of which are still reproduced decades after she painted them – and Huntley and Palmers employed her to advertise their biscuits. The Church of the Good Shepherd in her home village of Dockenfield has a pair of Baynes's stained glass windows. For the Plymouth Congregational Church in Minneapolis, Baynes designed the world's largest pieces of crewel embroidery.

== As author ==
In Baynes's later years commissions could be hard to come by. There were days when fan mail and a rejection letter would arrive in the same post. Baynes used her fallow periods to put together some books of her own. Several came from her delight in animals – The Elephant's Ball (based on a nineteenth-century narrative poem), How Dog Began (a Kiplingesque fable dedicated to eleven of her own pets) and Questionable Creatures (a pseudo-mediaeval, cryptozoological fantasia that only found an American publisher when Baynes agreed to paint out a mermaid's breasts). But most of Baynes's books were the fruit of her abiding interest in religion. Good King Wenceslas celebrated the famous Christmas carol; The Song of the Three Holy Children illustrated an apocryphal passage from the Book of Daniel; Noah and the Ark and In the Beginning were drawn from the Book of Genesis; Thanks Be to God was an international anthology of prayers; How excellent is thy name! illustrated Psalm 8; and I Believe illustrated the Nicene Creed.

== Personal life ==
When Baynes's father retired he left India and returned to England, settling with Baynes's mother in a house close to Baynes's own near Farnham in southwest Surrey. Long estranged, they maintained a pretence of marriage, but lived lives that were essentially separate. A mistress with whom Baynes's father had established a relationship in India followed him to Surrey and set up home nearby. Baynes looked after both her parents loyally, even when the burden of caring for them became so great that she could do her illustrating only in the small hours of the night.

In 1961, after many "interesting and highly enjoyable" but evanescent love affairs, Baynes answered a knock on her door from an itinerant dog's meat salesman. He was Friedrich Otto Gasch, usually known as Fritz. Born on 21 September 1919 in Auerswalde, Saxony, Germany, Gasch had served in Erwin Rommel's Afrika Korps during the Second World War, had been taken prisoner and had then been sent via the United States to an English PoW camp. Once the war had ended he had decided to adopt England as his home. A whirlwind courtship culminated in Baynes's and Gasch's marrying on 18 March 1961. "Meeting Fritz", Baynes said, "was the best thing that ever happened to me; he was a splendid man and a wonderful husband who was completely tolerant of his wife's obsession to draw!" The Gasches lived in Rock Barn Cottage, Heath Hill, Dockenfield, in the North Downs. Their only child, a son, was stillborn. After retiring from work as a contract gardener, Gasch died on 28 October 1988 at the age of sixty-nine.

Two years after her husband died Baynes was contacted by Karin Gasch (born 1942), a daughter of Gasch's by an earlier marriage. Baynes took on the role of a Gasch family member. "It was", she said, "like something magical coming back at me through a wardrobe." Baynes became a friend of the Tolkien scholars Wayne G. Hammond, David Henshaw, Christina Scull and Brian Sibley. Baynes was also close to Tolkien, whose Christianity she approved of as "more rooted and unobtrusive" than Lewis's. After Tolkien and his wife had retired to Bournemouth, Baynes and Gasch used to visit them and join them for holidays.

== Death and legacy ==
Baynes died in Dockenfield on 1 August 2008, leaving behind unpublished illustrations for the Quran, Aesop's Fables and Sibley's Osric the Extraordinary Owl: this last was printed thirteen years later. She bequeathed her archive of several hundred drawings and paintings, her library of more than two thousand books, and her intellectual property rights to the Oxford Programme of Williams College, Williamstown, Massachusetts, with a request that her collection should be housed in the college's Chapin Library of Rare Books. There is a second, small Baynes archive at the University of Oregon. Sibley, writing in The Independent, summed up the style of his friend thus:

The hallmarks of her work were a talent for lively, imaginative designs; the ability to create a sense of energy and animation; a confident fluidity of line; a bold use of vibrant, gem-like colours and the subtle employment of negative space.

Baynes's standing in the pantheon of children's book illustrators is high, her drawings and paintings changing hands for thousands of pounds sterling. Most of the art that she created for Tolkien's and Lewis's books has remained continuously in print ever since it was first published. As of 1998, the Narnia stories alone had sold more than one hundred million copies. Baynes's paintings of Narnia have gained still wider currency through their use in featurettes in-home media releases of Hollywood's Chronicles of Narnia movies. Looking back after half a century, Baynes's verdict on her momentous trip through the back of a wardrobe was down to earth. "I just thought of it as work." In their In Memoriam for Baynes in the Mythlore Inklings journal, Hammond and Scull stated that

by her hand, the invented worlds of J. R. R. Tolkien and C. S. Lewis first came visually to life. Some readers, indeed, have said that for them, her pictures were Middle-earth, they were the land of Narnia".

== Bibliography ==
(Where more than one edition of a book by Lewis or Tolkien is listed, it is because they have different illustrations.)

=== Books by or edited by Baynes ===
- Victoria and the Golden Bird, Blackie, 1948
- How Dog Began, Methuen, 1985
- The Song of the Three Holy Children, Methuen, 1986
- Good King Wenceslas. Lutterworth, 1987
- Noah and the Ark, Methuen, 1988
- In the Beginning, Dent, 1990 (issued in the US as Let There Be Light, Simon & Schuster, 1991)
- Thanks Be to God: Prayers from Around the World, Lutterworth, 1990
- I Believe: The Nicene Creed, Frances Lincoln, 2003
- Questionable Creatures, Frances Lincoln, 2006
- The Elephant's Ball, Eerdmans, 2007
- Psalm 8: How Excellent is Thy Name!, Marion E. Wade Center, 2007

=== Books by or related to C. S. Lewis ===
- Gresham, Douglas: The Official Narnia Cookbook, HarperCollins, 1998
- Lewis, C. S.: The Lion, the Witch and the Wardrobe, Bles, 1950; Puffin, 1959; Collins, 1974; HarperCollins, 1991, 1998 and 2000
- —— Prince Caspian, Bles, 1951; Puffin, 1962; Collins, 1974; HarperCollins, 1998
- —— The Voyage of the Dawn Treader, Bles, 1952; Puffin, 1965; Collins, 1974; HarperCollins, 1998
- —— The Silver Chair, Bles, 1953; Puffin, 1965; Collins, 1974; HarperCollins, 1998
- —— The Horse and His Boy, Bles, 1954; Puffin, 1965; Collins, 1974; HarperCollins, 1998
- —— The Magician's Nephew, The Bodley Head, 1955; Puffin, 1963; The Bodley Head, 1975; HarperCollins, 1998
- —— The Last Battle, The Bodley Head, 1956; Puffin, 1964; The Bodley Head, 1977; HarperCollins, 1998
- —— (adapted): A Map of Narnia and the Surrounding Countries, poster, Collins, 1968
- —— (adapted): The Magical Land of Narnia Puzzle Book, HarperCollins, 1998
- —— (adapted): The Narnia Trivia Book, HarperCollins, 1999
- —— (adapted): The Wisdom of Narnia, HarperCollins, 2001
- —— (adapted): Narnia Chronology, HarperCollins, 2008
- Riordan, James: A Book of Narnians, HarperCollins, 1994
- Sibley, Brian: The Land of Narnia, HarperCollins, 1989
- Sibley, Brian and Sage, Alison: A Treasury of Narnia, HarperCollins, 1989

=== Books by J. R. R. Tolkien ===
- Farmer Giles of Ham, Allen & Unwin, 1949; HarperCollins, 1999 and 2014
- The Hobbit, Puffin, 1961 [cover only]
- The Adventures of Tom Bombadil, Allen & Unwin, 1962; HarperCollins, 2014
- Smith of Wootton Major, Allen & Unwin, 1967; Ballantine, 1969; Allen and Unwin, 1975; HarperCollins, 2015
- The Lord of the Rings, 3-volume de luxe edition, Allen & Unwin, 1964 [slipcase only]
- The Lord of the Rings, paperback, Allen & Unwin, 1968 [cover only]
- A Map of Middle-Earth, poster, Allen & Unwin, 1970
- There and Back Again: a Map of Bilbo's Journey Through Eriador and Rhovanion, poster, Allen & Unwin, 1971
- Bilbo's Last Song, poster, Allen & Unwin, 1974
- Sir Gawain and the Green Knight, Pearl and Sir Orfeo, Unwin Paperbacks, 1978 [cover only]
- The Fellowship of the Ring, Unwin Paperbacks, 1981 [cover only]
- The Two Towers, Unwin Paperbacks, 1981 [cover only]
- The Return of the King, Unwin Paperbacks, 1981 [cover only]
- Poems and Stories, Allen & Unwin, 1981
- Bilbo's Last Song, Unwin Hyman, 1990
- Smith of Wootton Major and Leaf by Niggle, audiobook, HarperCollins, 2003

=== Books by other authors ===
- Adams, Richard: Watership Down, Puffin, 1972 [cover and maps]; Allen Lane/Kestrel Books, 1982 [cover and maps]
- Alexander, Cecil Frances: All Things Bright and Beautiful, Lutterworth, 1986
- Andersen, Hans Christian: Andersen's Fairy Tales, Blackie, 1949
- —— Stories from Hans Christian Andersen selected by Philippa Pearce, Collins, 1972
- Backway, Monica: Hassan of Basorah, Blackie, 1958
- Barber, Richard: A Companion to World Mythology, Kestrel, 1979
- Bate, Joan Mary: The Curious Tale of Cloud City, Blackie, 1958
- de Beaumont, Jeanne-Marie Leprince: Beauty and the Beast, Perry Colour Books, 1942
- Bebbington, William George: And It Came to Pass, Allen & Unwin, 1951
- Blackmore, R. D.: Lorna Doone, Collins, 1970
- Blyton, Enid et al.: The Wonder Book for Children, Odhams, 1948
- Blyton, Enid: The Land of Farbeyond, Methuen, 1973
- Borer, Mary Cathcart: Don Quixote: Some of His Adventures, Longman, 1960
- —— Boadicea, Longman, 1965
- —— Christopher Columbus, Longman, 1965
- —— Joan of Arc, Longman, 1965
- —— King Alfred the Great, Longman, 1965
- Bremer, Francis J.: The Puritan Experiment, St James, 1977
- Bunyan, John: The Pilgrim's Progress, Blackie, 1949
- Burrough, Loretta: Sister Clare, W. H. Allen, 1960
- Carroll, Lewis: Alice in Wonderland and Through the Looking-Glass, Blackie, 1950
- Clark, Leonard: All Along Down Along, Longman, 1971
- Cockrill, Pauline: The Little Book of Celebrity Bears, Dorling Kindersley, 1992
- Denton, E. M.: Stars and Candles, Ernest Benn, 1958
- Dickinson, Peter: The Iron Lion, Blackie, 1983
- Dickinson, William Croft: Borrobil, Puffin, 1973
- Ensor, Dorothy: The Adventures of Hatim Tai, Harrap, 1960
- Field, William: An Historical and Descriptive Account of the Town and Castle of Warwick and the Neighbouring Leamington Spa, S. R. Publishers, 1969
- Foreman, Michael: Sarah et le Cheval de Sable, Deflandre Francoise, 1997
- Gail, Marzieh: Avignon in Flower, 1304 - 1403, Victor Gollancz, 1966
- Garnett, Emmeline: The Civil War 1640 - 1660, A. & C. Black, 1956
- Godden, Rumer: The Dragon of Og, Macmillan, 1981
- —— Four Dolls, Macmillan, 1983
- —— The Little Chair, Hodder, 1996
- Greaves, Margaret: The Naming, Dent, 1992
- Green, Roger Lancelyn: The Tale of Troy, Puffin, 1970
- —— Tales of the Greek Heroes, Puffin, 1983
- Grimm, Jacob and Wilhelm: Grimm's Fairy Tales, Blackie, 1949
- Harris, Rosemary: The Moon in the Cloud, Puffin, 1978 [cover only]
- —— The Shadow on the Sun, Puffin, 1978 [cover only]
- —— The Bright and Morning Star, Puffin, 1978 [cover only]
- —— The Enchanted Horse, Kestrel, 1981
- —— Love and the Merry-go-round, Hamish Hamilton, 1988
- —— Colm of the Islands, Walker, 1989
- Harvey, David: Dragon Smoke and Magic Song, Allen & Unwin, 1984
- Haskell, Arnold L. (ed.): The Ballet Annual 1951, A. & C. Black, 1951
- Hawkins, Robert Henry: Primary English Practice, Longman, 1958
- Henshall, David: Starchild and Witchfire, Macmillan, 1991
- Hickman, G. M. and Mayo, R. Elizabeth: Adventures at Home: Pilgrim Way Geographies, Book 1, Blackie, 1961
- Hickman, G. M.: Adventuring Abroad: Pilgrim Way Geographies, Book 2, Blackie, 1962
- Hieatt, Constance B.: The Joy of the Court, Thomas Y. Crowell, 1971
- Hitchcock, Albert: Great People Through the Ages, Blackie, 1954
- —— The British People: Their Work & Way of Life, Blackie, 1955
- Homans, Abigail Adams: Education by Uncles, Houghton Mifflin, 1966
- Hughes, Arthur George: Ali Baba and Aladdin, Longman, 1960
- Hume, Emily Gertrude: Days Before History, Blackie, 1952
- —— Children Through the Ages, Blackie, 1953
- Hunter, Eileen: Tales of Way-Beyond, Andre Deutsch, 1979
- Jekyll, Lady Agnes: Kitchen Essays, Collins, 1969
- Jenkins, A. E.: Titterstone Clee Hills: Everyday Life, Industrial History and Dialect, A. E. Jenkins, 1982
- Jones, Gwyn: Welsh Legends and Folk Tales, Puffin, 1979
- Kipling, Rudyard: How the Whale Got His Throat, Macmillan, 1983
- Koralek, Jenny: The Cobweb Curtain: a Christmas Story, Methuen, 1989
- —— The Moses Basket, Frances Lincoln, 2003
- —— The Coat of Many Colours, Frances Lincoln, 2004
- Krutch, Joseph Wood: The Most Wonderful Animals That Never Were. Houghton Mifflin, 1969
- Lethbridge, Katherine Greville: The Rout of the Ollafubs, Faber & Faber, 1964
- Llewellyn, Bernard: China's Courts and Concubines: Some People in China's History, Allen & Unwin, 1956
- MacBeth, George: The Story of Daniel, Lutterworth, 1986
- MacDonald, George: The Princess and the Goblin, Puffin, 1971 [cover only]
- —— The Princess and Curdie, Puffin, 1966 [cover only]
- Malcolmson, Anne Burnett: Miracle Plays: Seven Medieval Plays for Modern Players, Constable, 1960
- Markham, George (ed. Lucid, Dan): The Compleat Horseman, Robson, 1976
- Mitchison, Naomi: Graeme and the Dragon, Faber & Faber, 1954
- Morris, James (subsequently Jan): The Upstairs Donkey and Other Stolen Stories, Faber & Faber, 1962
- Muir, Lynette: The Unicorn Window, Abelard-Schuman, 1961
- Nicolas, Claude and Roels, Iliane: How Life Goes On: the Butterfly, Chambers, 1974
- —— How Life Goes On: the Duck, Chambers, 1975
- —— How Life Goes On: the Bee and the Cherry Tree, Chambers, 1976
- —— How Life Goes On: the Salmon. Chambers, 1976
- —— How Life Goes On; the Dolphin, Chambers, 1977
- —— How Life Goes On: the Frog, Chambers, 1977
- —— How Life Goes On; the Roe Deer, Chambers, 1977
- Norton, Mary: The Borrowers, Puffin, 1980 [cover only]
- —— The Borrowers Aloft, Puffin, 1980 [cover only]
- —— The Borrowers Afloat, Puffin, 1980 [cover only]
- —— The Borrowers Afield, Puffin, 1980 [cover only]
- —— The Borrowers Avenged, Kestrel, 1982
- Nuttall, Kenneth: Let's Act, Book 4, Longman, 1960
- Opie, Iona and Peter: The Puffin Book of Nursery Rhymes, Puffin, 1963
- —— A Family Book of Nursery Rhymes, Oxford University Press, 1964
- Peppin, Anthea: The National Gallery Children's Book, National Gallery, 1983
- Perry, Powell: Question Mark, Perry Colour Books, ?1942
- —— Wild Flower Rhymes, Perry Colour Books, ?1942
- —— Oldebus, Perry Colour Books, 1945
- —— Jumblebus 10, Perry Colour Books, 1951
- Phillips, Marjorie: Annabel and Bryony, Oxford University Press, 1953
- Piers, Helen: Snail and Caterpillar, Longman Young, 1972
- —— Grasshopper and Butterfly, Kestrel, 1975
- —— Frog and Water Shrew. Kestrel, 1981
- Potter, Beatrix: Country Tales, Frederick Warne, 1987
- —— Wag-by-Wall, Frederick Warne, 1987
- Pourrat, Henri: A Treasury of French Tales, Allen & Unwin, 1953
- Power, Rhoda D.: From the Fury of the Northmen, Houghton Mifflin, 1957
- Pridham, Radost: A Gift from the Heart: Folk Tales from Bulgaria, Methuen, 1966
- Ransome, Arthur: Old Peter's Russian Tales, Puffin, 1974 [cover only]
- Ray, Elizabeth: The Resourceful Cook, Macmillan, 1978 [cover only]
- Schikaneder, Emanuel (adapted by Perry, Powell): The Magic Flute, Perry Colour Books, 1943
- Sewell, Anna: Black Beauty, Puffin, 1954 [cover only]
- Sibley, Brian: Osric the Extraordinary Owl, Jay Johnstone, 2021
- Spenser, Edmund (ed. Warburg, Sandol Stoddard): Saint George and the Dragon, Houghton Mifflin, 1963
- Squire, Geoffrey: The Observer's Book of European Costume, Frederick Warne, 1975
- Stevenson, Victoria: Clover Magic, Country Life, 1944
- —— The Magic Footstool, Country Life, 1946
- —— The Magic Broom, Country Life, 1950
- Stewart, Katie: The Times Cookery Book, Collins, 1972
- Swift, Jonathan: Gulliver's Travels, Blackie, 1950
- Symonds, John: Harold: the Story of a Friendship, Dent, 1973 [cover only]
- Tower, Christopher: Oultre Jourdain, Weidenfeld & Nicolson, 1980
- Uden, Grant: A Dictionary of Chivalry, Longman, 1968
- Uttley, Alison: The Little Knife Who Did All the Work: Twelve Tales of Magic, Faber & Faber, 1962
- —— Recipes From an Old Farmhouse, Faber & Faber, 1966
- Westwood, Jennifer: Medieval Tales, Rupert Hart-Davis, 1967
- —— The Isle of Gramarye: an Anthology of the Poetry of Magic, Rupert Hart-Davis, 1970
- —— Tales and Legends, Rupert Hart-Davis, 1972
- Williams, Ursula Moray: The Adventures of the Little Wooden Horse, Puffin, 1985 [cover only]
- —— The Further Adventures of Gobbolino and the Little Wooden Horse, Puffin, 1984
- Williams-Ellis, Amabel: The Arabian Nights, Blackie, 1957
- —— Fairy Tales from the British Isles, Blackie, 1960
- —— More British Fairy Tales, Blackie, 1965
- Various: Puffin Annual No. 1, Puffin, 1974
- —— Puffin Annual No. 2, Puffin, 1975
