= Elendor =

- Engine: PennMUSH
- Platform: Platform independent
- Release: 1991
- Genre: MUSH
- Mode: Multiplayer

Elendor is a free online text-based multi-user game that simulates the environment of J. R. R. Tolkien's Middle-earth. Users create characters by determining species, sex, culture, description, history (and sometimes persona) and then role-playing with other users within the setting and atmosphere of Tolkien's world. For the purposes of consistency, the game accepts The Lord of the Rings, The Hobbit and The Silmarillion and to a lesser extent the other works of Tolkien as canonical materials. The time frame is shortly before the onset of the main events of The Lord of the Rings with Bilbo having gone to Rivendell. The game is run on a MUSH server using a variant of PennMUSH.

The game was established in October 1991 and has been called "the original Tolkien Middle-Earth MUSH". It has been noted for its large player population, and at its height during the late 1990s and early 2000s, the time of the production and release of Peter Jackson's film trilogy, Elendor was regarded as one of the most popular text-based worlds on the Internet. It was chosen as "Best Tolkien Community Site" by Yahoo! Internet Life magazine.

== Game play and mechanics ==
Elendor comprises twenty-one factions known within the game as cultures. Each covers a different group or geographic area of Middle-earth. As in The Lord of the Rings, action is confined to the northwest of Middle-earth. Users may play an Orc from Moria, an Elf from Mirkwood, a mortal Man from Dunland or a Hobbit from the Shire and other creatures and species. Some cultures and species are restricted and require approval by the game administration. These include the Ents, Trolls and Dúnedain as well as other special or powerful species. "Feature" Characters (FC) and "Book Feature" Characters (BFC) are granted to users as rewards for their dedicated work for a culture, good roleplaying ability and seniority.

The cultures are each governed by a "+ruler" (an out of character position) and a council of "Local Admins" or "LAs" who assist the +ruler. These users are responsible for the theme and day-to-day operation of their respective cultures. Above the +rulers is a council of "royals", and then "wizards", who are MUSH-wide administrators who have wide-ranging responsibilities that range from code and server maintenance to user arbitration and game theme oversight.
