= The Adventures of Tom Bombadil =

1962 poetry collection by J. R. R. Tolkien

The Adventures of Tom Bombadil and Other Verses from the Red Book
- Author: J. R. R. Tolkien
- Illustrator: Pauline Baynes
- Cover artist: Pauline Baynes
- Language: English
- Subject: Fantasy
- Genre: Poetry
- Publisher: George Allen & Unwin
- Publication date: 1962
- Publication place: United Kingdom
- Media type: Print (hardback and paperback)
- Pages: 304 (paperback)
- ISBN: 978-0007557271
- Preceded by: The Lord of the Rings
- Followed by: Tree and Leaf

The Adventures of Tom Bombadil is a 1962 collection of poetry by J. R. R. Tolkien. The book contains 16 poems, two of which feature Tom Bombadil, a character encountered by Frodo Baggins in The Lord of the Rings. The rest of the poems are an assortment of bestiary verse and fairy tale rhyme. Three of the poems appear in The Lord of the Rings as well. The book is part of Tolkien's Middle-earth legendarium.

The volume includes The Sea-Bell, subtitled Frodos Dreme, which W. H. Auden considered Tolkien's best poem. It is a piece of metrical and rhythmical complexity that recounts a journey to a strange land beyond the sea. Drawing on medieval "dream vision" poetry and Irish immram poems, the piece is markedly melancholic and the final note is one of alienation and disillusion.

The book was originally illustrated by Pauline Baynes and later by Roger Garland. The book, like the first edition of The Fellowship of the Ring, is presented as if it is an actual translation from the Red Book of Westmarch, and contains some background information on the world of Middle-earth that is not found elsewhere: e.g. the name of the tower at Dol Amroth and the names of the Seven Rivers of Gondor. There is some fictional background information about those poems, linking them to Hobbit folklore and literature and to their supposed writers, in some cases Sam Gamgee.

== Publication history ==
The Adventures of Tom Bombadil was first published as a stand-alone book in 1962. Some editions, such as the Unwin Paperbacks edition (1975) and Poems and Stories, erroneously state that it was first published in 1961. Tolkien's letters confirm that 1962 is the correct year. Beginning with The Tolkien Reader in 1966, it was included in anthologies of Tolkien's shorter works. This trend continued after his death with Poems and Stories (1980) and Tales from the Perilous Realm (1997). In 2014 Christina Scull and Wayne G. Hammond edited a new stand-alone edition, which includes for each poem detailed commentary, original versions and their sources.

Only one of the poems, "Bombadil Goes Boating", was written specially for the book.

Seven of the works in the book are included on the 1967 album of Tolkien's songs and poems, Poems and Songs of Middle Earth. Six are read by Tolkien; the seventh, "Errantry", is set to music by Donald Swann.

== Contents ==
The poems are all supposedly works that Hobbits enjoyed; all are in English. Several are attributed in a mock-scholarly preface to Hobbit authors or traditions. Three are also among the many poems in The Lord of the Rings.

Contents
Group	No.	Title	Date	Hobbit "Author"	The Lord of the Rings ch.	Original title	Notes
Tom Bombadil	1	"The Adventures of Tom Bombadil"	1934	Buckland tradition			The character was named for a Dutch doll owned by Tolkien's children.
Tom Bombadil	2	"Bombadil Goes Boating"	1962	Buckland tradition			written for the book
Fairies	3	"Errantry"	1933	Bilbo Baggins			Shares rhyming scheme, metre and some lines with "Song of Eärendil"
Fairies	4	"Princess Mee"	1924			"The Princess Ni"	
Man in the Moon	5	"The Man in the Moon Stayed Up Too Late"	1923	Bilbo Baggins	I.9 "At the Sign of the Prancing Pony"		Sung by Frodo in Bree expanded from "Hey Diddle Diddle (the Cat and the Fiddle)"
Man in the Moon	6	"The Man in the Moon Came Down Too Soon"	1915 (MS)	"ultimately from Gondor"			Mentions Bay of Belfalas
Trolls	7	"The Stone Troll"	1954	Sam Gamgee	I.12 "Flight to the Ford"		Recited by Sam in the Trollshaws
Trolls	8	"Perry-the-Winkle"		Sam Gamgee			
An odd one out	9	"The Mewlips"	1937			"Knocking at the Door"	It concerns the Mewlips, an imaginary race of evil creatures that feed on passers by, collecting their bones in a sack. The poem describes the long and lonely road needed to reach the Mewlips, travelling beyond the Merlock Mountains, and through the marsh of Tode and the wood of "hanging trees and gallows-weed". None of these names appear on maps of Middle-earth. "Gorcrow" is an old name for the carrion crow.
Bestiary	10	"Oliphaunt"	1954	Sam Gamgee	IV.3 "The Black Gate is Closed"		recited in Ithilien
Bestiary	11	"Fastitocalon"	1962			"Adventures in Unnatural History and Medieval Metres, being the Freaks of Fisiologus"	
Bestiary	12	"Cat"		Sam Gamgee			
Atmosphere and emotion	13	"Shadow-Bride"	1936			"The Shadow Man"	
Atmosphere and emotion	14	"The Hoard"	1923			"Iúmonna Gold Galdre Bewunden"	
Atmosphere and emotion	15	"The Sea-Bell" or "Frodos Dreme"	1934	Associated with Frodo Baggins		"Looney"	
Atmosphere and emotion	16	"The Last Ship"	1934	"ultimately from Gondor"			Originally called "Firiel"

== Reception ==
In a 1963 review, Kirkus Reviews described the book's verses as "roll[ing] along in strange meters and weird words". It called the poems "difficult fun to read aloud", but suggested that the Stone Troll and Bombadil himself, though "memorable acquaintances", might be enjoyed more by adults than by children.

Richard C. West wrote that the book was the idea of Tolkien's aunt, Jane Neave, who wanted something about Tom Bombadil along the lines of one of Beatrix Potter's Little Books; but that Tolkien's publisher wanted a larger volume. Accordingly, Tolkien assembled poems he had on hand of a sort that Hobbits might enjoy, grouping them (according to the 2015 edition's editors Scull and Hammond) "like with like as far as possible", complete with "mock-scholarly preface".
