= George Allen & Unwin =

British publishing company

George Allen & Unwin was a British publishing company. Its history goes back to the 19th century when it was founded by George Allen with the backing of John Ruskin. When Allen died in 1907, the business continued under two of his sons, but merged with Swan Sonnenschein. After Sir Stanley Unwin purchased a controlling interest, the company changed its name to include Unwin's in 1914.

In 1936 the firm took on the task of publishing "The Hobbit", which appeared the following year and was a great success.

The firm established an Australian subsidiary in 1976. In 1990 Allen & Unwin was sold to HarperCollins, and the Australian branch was the subject of a management buy-out. The Australian firm is known as Allen & Unwin, whereas George Allen & Unwin is a convenient term to refer to the original British company.
