= J. R. R. Tolkien bibliography =

List of works by J. R. R. Tolkien

This is a bibliography of J. R. R. Tolkien (1892–1973), the English writer, philologist and Oxford professor best known for The Hobbit (1937) and The Lord of the Rings (1954–1955). Many of his posthumous works were edited by his son Christopher Tolkien.

== Middle Earth ==
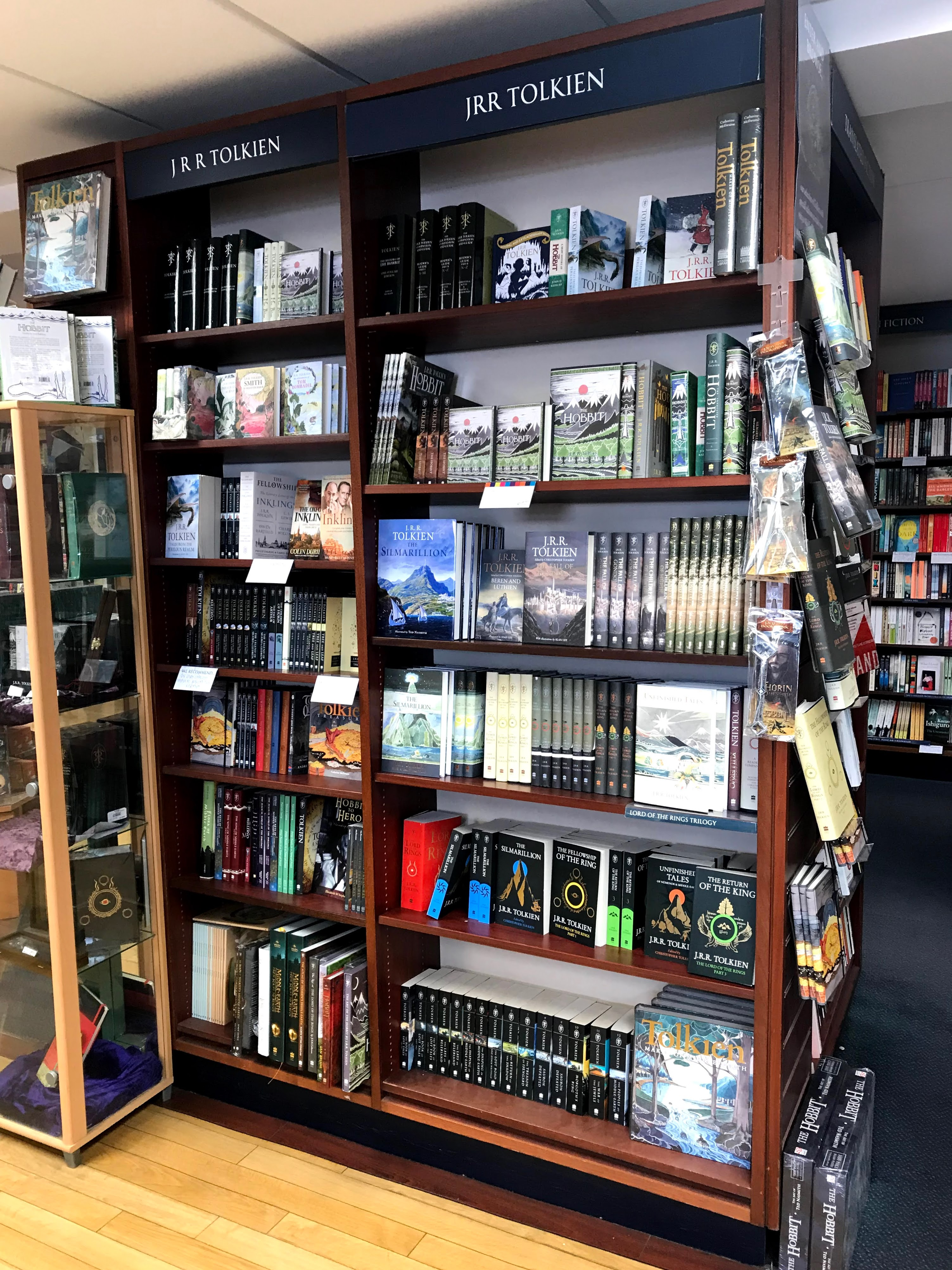
A selection of J. R. R. Tolkien's work

=== Published in Tolkien's lifetime ===
Middle-earth works published during Tolkien's lifetime
Year	Title	Publisher	Notes
1937	The Hobbit	George Allen & Unwin	Children's fantasy novel, subtitled or There and Back Again, illustrated by Tolkien. Revised in 1951 and 1966.
1954–55	The Lord of the Rings	George Allen & Unwin	Sequel to The Hobbit, published in three volumes: The Fellowship of the Ring (1954), The Two Towers (1954) and The Return of the King (1955). Second edition 1966, with a revised text and a new foreword.
1962	The Adventures of Tom Bombadil	George Allen & Unwin	Verse collection, subtitled and Other Verses from the Red Book, presented as poems from the hobbits' Red Book of Westmarch. Illustrated by Pauline Baynes.
1967	The Road Goes Ever On: A Song Cycle	Houghton Mifflin	Book of sheet music consisting of poems by Tolkien from The Lord of the Rings and The Adventures of Tom Bombadil set to music by Donald Swann, followed by notes and translations by Tolkien. A companion LP, Poems and Songs of Middle Earth, is listed under Recordings.

=== Posthumous ===
Middle-earth works by J. R. R. Tolkien published posthumously
Year	Title	Editor	Publisher	Notes
1974	"Bilbo's Last Song"	–	Houghton Mifflin	Poem in the voice of Bilbo Baggins at the Grey Havens, first published as a poster illustrated by Pauline Baynes. Published as an illustrated book in 1990.
1977	The Silmarillion	Christopher Tolkien	George Allen & Unwin	Mythology and history of the First Age and the later ages of Middle-earth, in five parts, compiled from drafts Tolkien worked on from the 1910s until his death. The original texts later appeared in The History of Middle-earth. Second edition 1999, with corrections.
1980	Unfinished Tales of Númenor and Middle-earth	Christopher Tolkien	George Allen & Unwin	Collection of narratives, essays and notes on Númenor and Middle-earth, most of them incomplete or left in draft. Presented as a companion to The Silmarillion, it covers the First, Second and Third Ages, with commentary by the editor on the sources and their relation to the published texts.
1983	The Book of Lost Tales, Part One	Christopher Tolkien	George Allen & Unwin	The History of Middle-earth, vol. I. The earliest versions of Tolkien's mythology, written mostly between 1916 and 1920, that include early accounts of the creation of the world and the coming of the Valar.
1984	The Book of Lost Tales, Part Two	Christopher Tolkien	George Allen & Unwin	The History of Middle-earth, vol. II. Early versions of the stories of Beren and Tinúviel, Túrin and the fall of Gondolin.
1985	The Lays of Beleriand	Christopher Tolkien	George Allen & Unwin	The History of Middle-earth, vol. III. Two long narrative poems on the First Age: "The Lay of the Children of Húrin" in alliterative verse and "The Lay of Leithian", the story of Beren and Lúthien, in rhyming couplets. Also includes shorter related verse and the editor's commentary.
1986	The Shaping of Middle-earth	Christopher Tolkien	George Allen & Unwin	The History of Middle-earth, vol. IV. Early outlines of the mythology, the first annals, and the cosmological text Ambarkanta, with maps.
1987	The Lost Road and Other Writings	Christopher Tolkien	Unwin Hyman	The History of Middle-earth, vol. V. Includes the unfinished story "The Lost Road", early writings on the fall of Númenor, and The Etymologies, a dictionary of Elvish roots.
1988	The Return of the Shadow	Christopher Tolkien	Unwin Hyman	The History of Middle-earth, vol. VI. First of four volumes on the composition of The Lord of the Rings, covering its early drafts.
1989	The Treason of Isengard	Christopher Tolkien	Unwin Hyman	The History of Middle-earth, vol. VII. Second volume on the composition of The Lord of the Rings, covering the drafts of the middle of the story.
1990	The War of the Ring	Christopher Tolkien	Unwin Hyman	The History of Middle-earth, vol. VIII. Third volume on the composition of The Lord of the Rings, covering the drafts of the war chapters.
1992	Sauron Defeated	Christopher Tolkien	HarperCollins	The History of Middle-earth, vol. IX. Completes the history of the writing of The Lord of the Rings, and includes The Notion Club Papers and "The Drowning of Anadûnê".
1993	Morgoth's Ring	Christopher Tolkien	HarperCollins	The History of Middle-earth, vol. X. First of two volumes on the later development of The Silmarillion, including the dialogue "Athrabeth Finrod ah Andreth" and the essay "Myths Transformed".
1994	The War of the Jewels	Christopher Tolkien	HarperCollins	The History of Middle-earth, vol. XI. Second of two volumes on the later development of The Silmarillion, including "The Wanderings of Húrin" and the essay "Quendi and Eldar".
1996	The Peoples of Middle-earth	Christopher Tolkien	HarperCollins	The History of Middle-earth, vol. XII. Final volume of the series, covering the making of the appendices to The Lord of the Rings and Tolkien's late writings.
2007	The Children of Húrin	Christopher Tolkien	HarperCollins	Story of Túrin Turambar and his sister Nienor, assembled into a continuous narrative from Tolkien's unfinished drafts. Illustrated by Alan Lee.
2017	Beren and Lúthien	Christopher Tolkien	HarperCollins	Story of Beren and Lúthien, shown through its successive versions. Illustrated by Alan Lee.
2018	The Fall of Gondolin	Christopher Tolkien	HarperCollins	Story of the fall of the hidden Elvish city of Gondolin, presented through its versions. Illustrated by Alan Lee.
2021	The Nature of Middle-earth	Carl F. Hostetter	HarperCollins	Late writings on Elvish life and death, time, the Valar and the geography of Middle-earth.
2022	The Fall of Númenor	Brian Sibley	HarperCollins	Selection of Tolkien's writings on the Second Age, arranged as a narrative by Brian Sibley and illustrated by Alan Lee.

== Other fiction and poetry ==
Other fiction and poetry by J. R. R. Tolkien
Year	Title	Editor	Publisher / Published in	Notes
1936	Songs for the Philologists	–	Privately printed in the Department of English, University College, London	Small collection of humorous and philological songs and poems in English and several older languages, by Tolkien, E. V. Gordon, and others.
1945	"Leaf by Niggle"	–	The Dublin Review (London), January 1945, pp. 46–61	Short story about a painter and his unfinished picture of a tree. Reprinted, with minor revisions, in Tree and Leaf (1964).
1945	"The Lay of Aotrou and Itroun"	–	The Welsh Review (Cardiff), December 1945, pp. 254–266	Narrative poem based on Breton ballads, completed in its original form in 1930 and revised for publication. Published as a book in 2016.
1949	Farmer Giles of Ham	–	George Allen & Unwin	Comic fable in the manner of a medieval romance, illustrated by Pauline Baynes.
1953	The Homecoming of Beorhtnoth Beorhthelm's Son	Geoffrey Bullough	Essays and Studies by Members of the English Association, new series, vol. 6 (John Murray)	Verse dialogue on the aftermath of the Battle of Maldon (991), with a prose introduction and a critical essay, "Ofermod". Reprinted in The Tolkien Reader (1966).
1964	Tree and Leaf	–	George Allen & Unwin	Pairs the essay "On Fairy-Stories" (revised from its 1947 publication) with the short story "Leaf by Niggle" (first printed in 1945), and adds an introduction by Tolkien on their composition. The 1988 edition added the poem "Mythopoeia".
1966	The Tolkien Reader	–	Ballantine Books	Omnibus that reprints Farmer Giles of Ham, The Adventures of Tom Bombadil, "Leaf by Niggle" and "On Fairy-Stories", with the first book publication of The Homecoming of Beorhtnoth Beorhthelm's Son.
1967	Smith of Wootton Major	–	George Allen & Unwin	Fantasy novella, illustrated by Pauline Baynes.
1982	Mr. Bliss	–	George Allen & Unwin	Children's picture book that Tolkien wrote and illustrated for his own children around 1932, about a man whose first motor-car leads to a series of mishaps. Published as a facsimile of his manuscript and drawings.
1998	Roverandom	Christina Scull and Wayne G. Hammond	HarperCollins	Children's story told in 1925 to Tolkien's son Michael, about a dog turned into a toy by a wizard. Submitted for publication in 1937 but unpublished until 1998.
2009	The Legend of Sigurd and Gudrún	Christopher Tolkien	HarperCollins	Two narrative poems in alliterative verse on the Norse legend of Sigurd, with the editor's commentary.
2013	The Fall of Arthur	Christopher Tolkien	HarperCollins	Unfinished narrative poem in alliterative verse on the legend of King Arthur, written in the 1930s and abandoned, edited with commentary by Christopher Tolkien.
2015	The Story of Kullervo	Verlyn Flieger	HarperCollins	Tolkien's prose retelling, written in 1914–1915, of a story from the Kalevala, with two of his essays on the epic.
2024	The Collected Poems of J. R. R. Tolkien	Christina Scull and Wayne G. Hammond	HarperCollins	Three-volume collection of most of Tolkien's known poetry, including a number of previously unpublished poems.
2025	The Bovadium Fragments	Christopher Tolkien	HarperCollins	Previously unpublished short satirical fantasy, written between the late 1950s and about 1960 and published with his illustrations, together with an essay by Richard Ovenden, "The Origin of Bovadium".

== Scholarship and translations ==
Scholarship and translations by J. R. R. Tolkien
Year	Title	Editor	Publisher / Published in	Notes
1922	A Middle English Vocabulary	–	Clarendon Press	Companion glossary for Kenneth Sisam's anthology Fourteenth Century Verse & Prose (1921), compiled by Tolkien while he was at the University of Leeds.
1925	Sir Gawain and the Green Knight	E. V. Gordon (co-editor)	Clarendon Press	Scholarly edition of the Middle English poem, with introduction, notes and glossary. Later revised by Norman Davis (1967).
1937	Beowulf: The Monsters and the Critics	–	Humphrey Milford (Oxford University Press)	Tolkien's 1936 British Academy lecture on Beowulf criticism, given as the Sir Israel Gollancz Memorial Lecture. Published separately before appearing in the Proceedings of the British Academy. Reprinted in The Monsters and the Critics, and Other Essays (1983).
1939	The Reeve's Tale	–	Privately printed, Oxford	Pamphlet with a two-page introduction by Tolkien and a reworked, slightly abbreviated text of Chaucer's "The Reeve's Tale", prepared for recitation.
1944	Sir Orfeo	–	The Academic Copying Office, Oxford	Booklet reproducing the Middle English poem as edited by Tolkien, with his editorial note. His modern English translation appeared in Sir Gawain and the Green Knight, Pearl, and Sir Orfeo (1975).
1947	"On Fairy-Stories"	C. S. Lewis	Essays Presented to Charles Williams (Oxford University Press)	Essay on the fairy-story as a literary form, based on Tolkien's 1939 Andrew Lang lecture at the University of St Andrews, which he expanded for this publication. Revised again for Tree and Leaf (1964). An expanded edition appeared in 2008.
1962	Ancrene Wisse: The English Text of the Ancrene Riwle	–	Early English Text Society (Oxford University Press)	Tolkien's edition of the English text from the manuscript in Corpus Christi College, Cambridge, with an introduction by N. R. Ker.
1963	"English and Welsh"	–	Angles and Britons: O'Donnell Lectures (Cardiff: University of Wales Press)	Lecture on the English and Welsh languages, delivered in 1955 and first printed here. Reprinted in The Monsters and the Critics, and Other Essays (1983).
1975	Sir Gawain and the Green Knight, Pearl, and Sir Orfeo	Christopher Tolkien	George Allen & Unwin	Tolkien's verse translations into modern English of three Middle English poems of the 14th century, with commentary. Short translation of "Gawain's Leave-taking" is added at the end.
1982	The Old English Exodus	Joan Turville-Petre	Clarendon Press	Tolkien's text, translation and commentary on the Old English poem Exodus, edited from his lecture notes of the 1930s–1950s.
1982	Finn and Hengest: The Fragment and the Episode	Alan Bliss	George Allen & Unwin	Tolkien's Oxford lecture materials on the Finn and Hengest story in the Finnesburg Fragment and Beowulf.
1983	The Monsters and the Critics, and Other Essays	Christopher Tolkien	George Allen & Unwin	Collection of seven essays and lectures on language and literature: "Beowulf: The Monsters and the Critics", "On Translating Beowulf", "Sir Gawain and the Green Knight" (a 1953 lecture published here for the first time), "On Fairy-Stories", "A Secret Vice" (a 1931 address published here for the first time), "English and Welsh" and "Valedictory Address to the University of Oxford, 5 June 1959".
2002	Beowulf and the Critics	Michael D. C. Drout	Arizona Center for Medieval and Renaissance Studies, Arizona State University	Scholarly edition of two manuscript drafts of Tolkien's longer essay on Beowulf, which he condensed into the 1936 lecture "Beowulf: The Monsters and the Critics".
2008	Tolkien On Fairy-stories	Verlyn Flieger and Douglas A. Anderson	HarperCollins	Expanded edition of Tolkien's essay "On Fairy-Stories", reprinting the 1964 text with the editors' commentary, a textual history, contemporary newspaper reports of the 1939 lecture, and two earlier drafts of the essay.
2014	Beowulf: A Translation and Commentary	Christopher Tolkien	HarperCollins	Tolkien's prose translation of the Old English poem Beowulf, made in the 1920s, with his commentary on it, which was the basis for the 1936 lecture "Beowulf: The Monsters and the Critics". Also includes his previously unpublished story "Sellic Spell" and two versions of "The Lay of Beowulf".
2016	A Secret Vice: Tolkien on Invented Languages	Dimitra Fimi and Andrew Higgins	HarperCollins	Expanded edition of Tolkien's 1931 lecture on constructed languages, first published in The Monsters and the Critics, and Other Essays (1983). Adds text omitted from earlier printings, new manuscript material, and essays on Tolkien and invented languages.
2023	The Battle of Maldon: together with The Homecoming of Beorhtnoth	Peter Grybauskas	HarperCollins	Tolkien's prose translation of the Old English poem The Battle of Maldon, published with The Homecoming of Beorhtnoth Beorhthelm's Son and a previously unpublished lecture, "The Tradition of Versification in Old English".

=== Selected academic papers ===
- 1924–1927: "Philology: General Works". The Year's Work in English Studies 4–6 (covering 1923–1925). London: Oxford University Press for the English Association. Three annual review essays.
- 1925: "Some Contributions to Middle-English Lexicography". The Review of English Studies 1, no. 2 (April), pp. 210–215. Notes on Middle English words and their etymologies, about half of them on the glossary to the Early English Text Society edition of Hali Meidenhad.
- 1929: "Ancrene Wisse and Hali Meiðhad". In H. W. Garrod, ed., Essays and Studies by Members of the English Association, vol. 14, pp. [104]–126. Oxford: Clarendon Press. A study of the language of two Middle English texts, influential for identifying the dialect later called the "AB language".
- 1932: "The Name 'Nodens'". In R. E. M. Wheeler and T. V. Wheeler, Report on the Excavation of the Prehistoric, Roman, and Post-Roman Site in Lydney Park, Gloucestershire, pp. 132-137. London: Society of Antiquaries of London; printed at Oxford University Press. A note on the etymology of the name of the Romano-British god Nodens.
- 1932–1934: "Sigelwara Land". Medium Ævum 1, no. 3 (December 1932), pp. 183–196 (Part 1); 3, no. 2 (June 1934), pp. 95–111 (Part 2). A study of the Old English word Sigelhearwa.
- 1934: "Chaucer as a Philologist: The Reeve's Tale". Transactions of the Philological Society (1934), pp. [1]–70. London: David Nutt (A. G. Berry), for the Philological Society. A study of the northern dialect that Chaucer gives the two Cambridge students in "The Reeve's Tale".
- 1953: "Middle English 'Losenger': Sketch of an Etymological and Semantic Enquiry". In Essais de philologie moderne (1951), pp. [63]–76. Paris: Les Belles Lettres. Tolkien's lecture to the Congrès International de Philologie Moderne in September 1951, where he attended as Oxford's official representative. It traces the etymology of losenger as a way into the contact between Germanic and Latin in northern Gaul.

== Letters ==
Published letters of J. R. R. Tolkien
Year	Title	Editor	Publisher	Notes
1976	The Father Christmas Letters	Baillie Tolkien	George Allen & Unwin	Illustrated letters Tolkien wrote to his children each Christmas from 1920 to 1943, in the persona of Father Christmas.
1981	The Letters of J. R. R. Tolkien	Humphrey Carpenter, with Christopher Tolkien	George Allen & Unwin	A selection of 354 letters, excerpts and drafts, with endnotes.
2023	The Letters of J. R. R. Tolkien: Revised and Expanded Edition	Humphrey Carpenter, with Christopher Tolkien	HarperCollins	Expanded edition of the 1981 collection, restoring material cut from the original and adding letters that were not previously published.

== Art ==
Published art by J. R. R. Tolkien
Year	Title	Editor	Publisher	Notes
1976	Catalogue of an Exhibition of Drawings by J. R. R. Tolkien	–	Ashmolean Museum	Catalogue of an exhibition at the Ashmolean Museum, Oxford (1976–1977), and the National Book League, London (1977).
1979	Pictures by J. R. R. Tolkien	Christopher Tolkien	George Allen & Unwin	A collection of Tolkien's paintings, drawings and designs, with a foreword and notes by Christopher Tolkien.
1995	J. R. R. Tolkien: Artist and Illustrator	Wayne G. Hammond and Christina Scull	HarperCollins	Reproduces Tolkien's paintings, drawings and designs, with an accompanying text by the authors.
2011	The Art of The Hobbit	Wayne G. Hammond and Christina Scull	HarperCollins	Reproduces Tolkien's illustrations, sketches, and paintings for The Hobbit, with commentary by the authors.
2015	The Art of The Lord of the Rings	Wayne G. Hammond and Christina Scull	HarperCollins	Reproduces Tolkien's drawings, maps, and designs for The Lord of the Rings, with commentary by the authors.

== Recordings ==
- 1967: Poems and Songs of Middle Earth. Caedmon Records (TC 1231). Tolkien reading poems from The Adventures of Tom Bombadil and The Lord of the Rings, with Donald Swann's settings from The Road Goes Ever On performed by William Elvin and Swann.
- 1975: J. R. R. Tolkien Reads and Sings His The Hobbit and The Lord of the Rings. Caedmon Records (TC 1477 and TC 1478). Two LPs based on a recording made by George Sayer in August 1952.

== Contributions to books and periodicals ==
- 1915: Oxford Poetry 1915. Oxford: Blackwell. Includes Tolkien's poem "Goblin Feet".
- 1918: Smith, Geoffrey Bache. A Spring Harvest. London: Erskine Macdonald. Includes a three-paragraph prefatory note by Tolkien.
- 1923: The Gryphon (Leeds), January, p. 130. First printing of the poem "Iúmonna Gold Galdre Bewunden", based on a line of Beowulf; revised in 1937 and again as "The Hoard" in The Adventures of Tom Bombadil.
- 1923: A Northern Venture: Verses by Members of the Leeds University English School Association. Leeds: Swan Press. Includes three poems by Tolkien: "Þā Eadigan Saelidan: The Happy Mariners", "Why the Man in the Moon Came Down Too Soon" and "Enigmata Saxonica Nuper Inventa Duo".
- 1923: Yorkshire Poetry (Leeds) 2, no. 19 (October–November), pp. [1–3]. First printing of "The Cat and the Fiddle: A Nursery-Rhyme Undone and Its Scandalous Secret Unlocked", revised for The Lord of the Rings and The Adventures of Tom Bombadil (as "The Man in the Moon Stayed Up Too Late").
- 1924: Leeds University Verse 1914–24. Leeds: Swan Press. Includes three poems by Tolkien: "An Evening in Tavrobel", "The Lonely Isle" and "The Princess Ni".
- 1925: The Gryphon (Leeds), June, p. 217. First printing of the poem "Light as Leaf on Lindentree", later incorporated into "The Lay of the Children of Húrin" in The Lays of Beleriand (1985).
- 1927: Stapeldon Magazine (Exeter College, Oxford), June, pp. 123–127. Two bestiary poems signed "Fisiologus", early versions of "Fastitocalon" (The Adventures of Tom Bombadil) and "Oliphaunt" (The Two Towers).
- 1927: Tancred, G. S., ed. Realities: An Anthology of Verse. Leeds: Swan Press. Includes Tolkien's poem "The Nameless Land".
- 1928: Haigh, Walter E. A New Glossary of the Dialect of the Huddersfield District. London: Oxford University Press. Includes a foreword by Tolkien.
- 1933: The Oxford Magazine 52, no. 5 (9 November), p. 180. First printing of Tolkien's poem "Errantry", in a version later revised for The Adventures of Tom Bombadil (1962). It is also the source of Bilbo's song of Eärendil in The Fellowship of the Ring, book 2.
- 1934: The Oxford Magazine, 18 January, p. 340. First printing of "Looney", revised as "The Sea-Bell".
- 1934: The Oxford Magazine, 15 February, pp. 464–465. First printing of "The Adventures of Tom Bombadil", introducing Tom Bombadil; revised for the 1962 collection..
- 1934: Chronicle of the Convent of the Sacred Heart, Roehampton 4, pp. 30–32. First printing of "Firiel", revised as "The Last Ship".
- 1937: The Oxford Magazine, 18 February, p. 403. First printing of the poem "Knocking at the Door", signed "Oxymore", revised as "The Mewlips" in The Adventures of Tom Bombadil.
- 1940: Clark Hall, John R., trans. Beowulf and the Finnesburg Fragment: A Translation into Modern English Prose. New edition, completely revised. London: George Allen & Unwin. Includes Tolkien's "Prefatory Remarks on Prose Translation of Beowulf", later reprinted as "On Translating Beowulf" in The Monsters and the Critics, and Other Essays (1983).
- 1953: Gordon, E. V., ed. Pearl. Oxford: Clarendon Press. Includes notes and corrections by Tolkien and part of the introduction, "Form and Purpose".
- 1955: Salu, M. B., trans. The Ancrene Riwle. London: Burns & Oates. Includes a two-paragraph preface by Tolkien.
- 1955: Time and Tide (London), 3 December, p. 1561. First printing of Tolkien's poem "Imram", on the voyage of Saint Brendan. Earlier versions, under the titles "The Ballad of St. Brendan's Death" and "The Death of St. Brendan", appear in The Notion Club Papers, published in Sauron Defeated (1992).
- 1958: Goolden, Peter, ed. The Old English Apollonius of Tyre. Oxford University Press. With a prefatory note by Tolkien.
- 1965: Hillier, Caroline, ed. Winter's Tales for Children 1. London: Macmillan. Includes two poems by Tolkien, "Once Upon a Time" and "The Dragon's Visit".
- 1966: Jones, Alexander, ed. The Jerusalem Bible. London: Darton, Longman & Todd. Includes Tolkien's translation of the Book of Jonah, which was edited by others before publication. His own text was published in 2014 in the Journal of Inklings Studies.
- 1966: "Tolkien on Tolkien". Diplomat (New York), October, p. 39. Autobiographical article, incorporating part of a statement Tolkien prepared for Houghton Mifflin and three further paragraphs.
- 1967: Shenandoah (Lexington, Virginia) 18, no. 2 (Winter), pp. 96–97. "For W. H. A.", a poem in Old English with a facing modern English version, written as a tribute to W. H. Auden on his sixtieth birthday.
- 1971: Byrne, Evelyn B., and Otto M. Penzler, eds. Attacks of Taste. New York: Gown Publishers. Includes a one-paragraph statement by Tolkien.
- 1975: Lobdell, Jared, ed. A Tolkien Compass. La Salle, Illinois: Open Court. Includes Tolkien's "Guide to the Names in The Lord of the Rings", revised for publication by Christopher Tolkien. A fuller version, "Nomenclature of The Lord of the Rings", was published in 2005 in Hammond and Scull's The Lord of the Rings: A Reader's Companion.
- 1979: Salu, Mary, and Robert T. Farrell, eds. J. R. R. Tolkien, Scholar and Storyteller: Essays in Memoriam. Ithaca, New York: Cornell University Press. Includes Tolkien's "Valedictory Address to the University of Oxford, 5 June 1959".

== See also ==
- J. R. R. Tolkien § Writing
- Tolkien research
- Languages constructed by J. R. R. Tolkien
- Tolkien's legendarium
- Translations of The Lord of the Rings
- Translations of The Hobbit
- Works inspired by J. R. R. Tolkien

== Sources ==
- Hammond, Wayne G. (1993). J. R. R. Tolkien: A Descriptive Bibliography. New Castle, Delaware: Oak Knoll Books. ISBN 0-938768-42-5.
