= Tolkien's Art: 'A Mythology for England' =

1979 book by Jane Chance

Tolkien's Art
- First paperback edition
- Author: Jane Chance
- Language: English
- Subject: J. R. R. Tolkien
- Genre: Tolkien studies
- Publisher: Macmillan
- Publication date: 1979
- Publication place: United Kingdom
- Media type: Hardcover (paperback, 1980)
- Pages: 164
- ISBN: 978-0-333-29034-7

Tolkien's Art: 'A Mythology for England' is a 1979 book of Tolkien scholarship by Jane Chance, writing then as Jane Chance Nitzsche. The book looks in turn at Tolkien's essays "On Fairy-Stories" and "Beowulf: The Monsters and the Critics"; The Hobbit; the fairy-stories "Leaf by Niggle" and "Smith of Wootton Major"; the minor works "Lay of Autrou and Itroun", "The Homecoming of Beorhtnoth", "Imram", and Farmer Giles of Ham; The Lord of the Rings; and very briefly in the concluding section, The Silmarillion. In 2001, a second edition extended all the chapters but still treated The Silmarillion, that Tolkien worked on throughout his life, as a sort of coda.

Tolkien scholars including Tom Shippey and Verlyn Flieger, while noting some good points in the book, roundly criticised Chance's approach as seeking to fit his writings into an allegorical pattern which in their view did not exist, and disagreeing with points of detail. They noted that Bilbo Baggins, for instance, is nothing like a king. Others commented that the second edition had failed to keep up with advances in Tolkien scholarship. The scholar Michael Drout has praised the appropriateness of the subtitle's description of Tolkien's legendarium, "A mythology for England", though it seems that Tolkien never used that exact phrase.

== Context ==
The English philologist J. R. R. Tolkien published the bestselling children's book The Hobbit in 1937, and the bestselling fantasy novel The Lord of the Rings in 1954–1955. His fantasy writings were severely criticised by the literary establishment. From the 1970s, Tolkien scholars including Tom Shippey and Verlyn Flieger began to mount a detailed defence of Tolkien.

Jane Chance (formerly writing as Jane Chance Nitzsche) is an American scholar, from 1973 at Rice University, specializing in medieval English literature, gender studies, and Tolkien.

== Book ==
=== Publication history ===
Tolkien's Art: 'A Mythology for England' was first published by Macmillan in London in 1979. A paperback edition in Papermac appeared in 1980. A revised edition was published by the University Press of Kentucky in 2001.

=== Synopsis ===
The Lord of the Rings resembles The Hobbit which ... must acknowledge a great thematic and narrative debt to the Old English epic [Beowulf], even though The Hobbit's happy ending renders it closer to fantasy ... than to the elegy with its tragic ending... Both works have the same theme, a quest on which a most unheroic hobbit achieves heroic stature; they have the same structure, the 'there and back again' of the quest romance, and both extend the quest through the cycle of one year...

— Tolkien's Art, ch. 5 "The Lord of the Rings: Tolkien's Epic"

The first edition had five named chapters, and a short concluding section. "The Critic as Monster" looked at Tolkien's major essays "On Fairy-Stories" and "Beowulf: The Monsters and the Critics". Chance notes the powerful effect that Tolkien's Beowulf essay had on scholarship, and that it provoked a lasting controversy over the poem's Germanic and Christian components. "The King Under the Mountain: Tolkien's Children's Story", dealt with The Hobbit. She notes the central place given to the book's two leading monsters, Gollum and Smaug, and the monstrous aspects of the Elvenking, the Master of Dale, and the dwarf-king, to whom she ascribes "the more 'spiritual' sins" compared to the gluttony, sloth, and anger of the other monsters such as the trolls, goblins, and wargs. She contrasts the "unobtrusive" hobbit Bilbo Baggins with the "usually obtrusive" and uncharitable narrator of the story. "The Christian King: Tolkien's Fairy-Stories", explored the Christian symbolism and allegory of "Leaf by Niggle" and "Smith of Wootton Major". "The Germanic King: Tolkien's Medieval Parodies", looked at some minor works, namely "The Lay of Aotrou and Itroun", "The Homecoming of Beorhtnoth", "Imram", and Farmer Giles of Ham, comparing them to Old English and Middle English works such as Beowulf, The Battle of Maldon, and Sir Gawain and the Green Knight. "The Lord of the Rings: Tolkien's Epic" set Tolkien's book in the context of epic works from Beowulf to Le Morte d'Arthur, Faerie Queene and Don Quixote. Those books variously explore chivalric and Christian ideals and modern realism, overlaid according to Chance on medieval heroism and medieval Christianity. Chance contrasts Tolkien's "two Germanic lords", the dour legalistic Denethor and the loving Théoden. A final brief section dealt with The Silmarillion: "Basically the mythology dramatises the conflict between the fallen Vala Melkor, or Morgoth, followed by his Maia servant Sauron and the One, Eru or Iluvatar, 'Father of All', although this is not at first apparent because of the bewildering array of tales and characters". She describes the work's themes as "clearly biblical", concluding that Tolkien had "indeed finally written that 'mythology for England'".

The 2001 revised edition extended all the chapters in the light of Tolkien scholarship and of Christopher Tolkien's 12-volume The History of Middle-earth, but continued to describe The Silmarillion as "an appropriate coda to Tolkien's life".

== Reception ==
=== First edition ===
Reviewing the first edition, Shippey writes that "a proper reading of Tolkien must depend on some sensitivity to the other literatures and views of literature he spent his time considering". In his view, Chance rightly set out to find the "seeds" of Tolkien's "a mythology for England" (a phrase due to his biographer Humphrey Carpenter) in the medieval: it was "regrettable that [her attempt] fails". Shippey writes that Chance does not grasp Tolkien's valuing of the literal: that the Beowulf dragon is still a real dragon, "not yet Satan" – as it would have been a few centuries later. In Shippey's opinion, this "mistake" makes it too easy for the critic to impute meanings that Tolkien did not intend. He gives as example Chance's assertion that Tolkien's talk of disliking allegory since he grew "old and wary enough to detect its presence" must be an allegory, and that his reference to age must mean he did not really dislike allegory: Shippey calls this a perfectly circular argument. He replies that Tolkien in fact definitely liked "strong fierce old men", such as Aragorn, Théoden King, Helm Hammerhand, and Gandalf; and that they represent "that unyielding courage to which Tolkien gave so high a value, and which he set at the heart of his mythology". He states that Chance has no time for such old-fashioned values, and instead praises Bilbo's growth as a "type of the good king". He observes that Bilbo is nothing like a king, and that talk of "types" just muddies the waters. Shippey ends by saying that there are "some" good points in the book: Chance rightly sees "self-images of Tolkien" throughout his fiction; and she is right, too, in seeing Middle-earth as a balance between creativity and scholarship, "Germanic past and Christian present".

The scholar of literature and religion David Lyle Jeffrey, writing in VII, states that Chance interpreted Tolkien's various activities – philology, editing scholarly textbooks, translating, storytelling – "as roles", a sort of "complex psychological warfare in Tolkien's conscious and subconscious mind". Jeffrey comments that this has the advantage of causing the reader to look at Tolkien in the context of his professional work and intellectual history, but that he fears that she "offers us a more complex and schizophrenic Tolkien" than might be justified by the diversity of his lines of work. He writes that Chance "tries to 'save the appearances' for allegory" by demonstrating that Tolkien deliberately played "as a bad exegete". He states, too, that she argued that Tolkien's "old critic" represented St Augustine's "Old Man" who adhered to the letter rather than the spirit of the law. Jeffrey doubts that Chance was correct to conclude this, or that there was a mental split between Tolkien the writer and Tolkien the philologist.

Leslie Stratyner, writing in Mythlore, notes that Chance argues that the enemy in The Lord of the Rings works mainly as "'a symbolic perversion of Christian rather than Germanic values'". Stratyner objects that the One Ring, embodying the nature of Sauron, can be read in terms of the Anglo-Saxon practice of giving rings to loyal followers, "twisted to his dark purpose"; his loyal thanes are the Nazgûl, and they serve him not because they feel loyal and loving towards him, but because he has enslaved them with magic rings.

=== Second edition ===
The Tolkien scholar Verlyn Flieger welcomes the "solid critical work" of the 2001 edition amidst the publicity for Peter Jackson's then-forthcoming films of The Lord of The Rings. She agrees with Chance's identification of the Finnish Kalevala as the trigger for Tolkien's legendarium, but found misleading her general comparison with "mythological tales that often begin with creation" – as diverse as the Bible, Ovid's Metamorphoses, and the Mabinogion. Flieger agrees with Chance's comparison of Eru Ilúvatar with God, and the Valar with the Bible's angels, but writes that Chance "fails to note the equally important differences" where Tolkien intentionally "diverged from these models". Flieger writes that Chance was following Tolkien's intentions in calling the tales of Middle-earth "a mythology for England", but that she is not persuaded by Chance's argument that this applies to all of Tolkien's fiction. That would, Flieger writes, leave The Silmarillion only as a "'coda', as if it were an addendum to the principal composition", ignoring the lifetime's work that Tolkien put into that work, and from which The Hobbit and The Lord of the Rings both emerged. Finally, she states that Chance follows Tolkien's biographer, Humphrey Carpenter, throughout the book in describing Tolkien as "two people", one a dry scholar, the other an artist in words, supporting this with "sound scholarly evidence". Flieger disagrees with some "points of interpretation", writing that "Frodo, not Sam, is 'the real threat to Sauron'" and finds "Gollum's sacrifice of himself" an over-generous description of "that unhappy creature". She concludes that the book does explain "the scholarly roots of Tolkien's fiction", and how "those roots nourished the tree".

The independent scholar Daniel J. Smitherman writes that Chance had narrowed her scope to "the theme of kingship and its adversaries—of the heroes and the monsters". He agrees that in Tolkien, both hero and monster sometimes appear directly, and are sometimes concealed. He finds Chance's 1979 demonstration that Tolkien used (medieval) English literature significant, but by the 2000s there was so much Tolkien scholarship, and it was based on so much more of Tolkien's writing than Chance had access to in the 1970s, that the revision seemed less than valuable; and that would have been true even if Chance's writing style had been better.

Margaret Hiley, writing in Modern Fiction Studies, calls Chance's Tolkien's Art and Shippey's The Road to Middle-earth "the best" of "many critical studies" of Tolkien's method in creating a new mythology.

=== "A mythology for England" ===
Tolkien scholars have analysed the extent to which Tolkien intended his Middle-earth writings, his legendarium, to form "A mythology for England", as the book's subtitle proposes. In a 1951 letter to the publisher Milton Waldman, Tolkien wrote "I had a mind to make a body of more or less connected legend, ranging from the large and cosmogonic, to the level of romantic fairy-story – the larger founded on the lesser in contact with the earth, the lesser drawing splendour from the vast backcloths – which I could dedicate simply to: to England; to my country. ..." Michael Drout states that Tolkien never used the actual phrase "A mythology for England", though commentators have found it appropriate as a description of much of his approach in creating Middle-earth. In the first edition, the subtitle was placed in inverted commas, indicating that it had been thought to be a direct quotation; the punctuation marks were removed from the subtitle in the revised edition of 2002, and Tolkien's 1951 letter to Waldman is quoted at length, heading the book's introduction.

== See also ==
- Tolkien and the Invention of Myth – a later book about Middle-earth edited by Jane Chance

== Sources ==
- Chance, Jane (1980) [1979]. Tolkien's Art: 'A Mythology for England'. Macmillan. ISBN 978-0-333-29034-7.
