= Niggles =

Niggles may refer to:

- A symptom of decompression sickness
- "Leaf by Niggle", a short story by J. R. R. Tolkien
