= The Tolkien Reader =

1966 anthology of works by J. R. R. Tolkien

- Cover of the first edition
- Author: J. R. R. Tolkien
- Illustrator: Pauline Baynes
- Language: English
- Genre: Fantasy short stories, play, essay, poetry
- Publisher: Ballantine Books
- Publication date: September 1966
- Publication place: United States
- Media type: Print (Paperback)
- Pages: xvi, 24, 112, 79, 64 pp (contents separately paginated)
- ISBN: 0-345-34506-1 (reprint)
- OCLC: 49979134
- Preceded by: Tree and Leaf
- Followed by: The Road Goes Ever On

The Tolkien Reader is an anthology of works by J. R. R. Tolkien. It includes a variety of short stories, poems, a play and some non-fiction. It compiles material previously published as three separate shorter books (Tree and Leaf, Farmer Giles of Ham, and The Adventures of Tom Bombadil), together with one additional piece and introductory material. It was published in 1966 by Ballantine Books in the USA.

Most of these works appeared in journals, magazines, or books years before the publication of The Tolkien Reader. The earliest published pieces are the poems "The Man in the Moon Stayed Up Too Late" and "The Hoard", both of which were first published in 1923. They were reprinted together with a variety of other poems in the book The Adventures of Tom Bombadil in 1962, and the entire book was included in The Tolkien Reader in 1966. The section titled Tree and Leaf is also a reprint. It was published as a book bearing the same name in 1964, and consists of material initially published in the 1940s. The book Farmer Giles of Ham was published in 1949, and unlike The Adventures of Tom Bombadil and Tree and Leaf, it did not merge previously published material, although unpublished versions of the story had existed since the 1920s. "The Homecoming of Beorhtnoth Beorhthelm's Son" was first printed in an academic journal in 1953.

The "Publisher's Note" and "Tolkien's Magic Ring" are the only works in the book which Tolkien did not write. They are also the only parts of the book which were written in the same year that The Tolkien Reader was published.

== Context ==
J. R. R. Tolkien wrote the works contained within The Tolkien Reader in different contexts and for different purposes. The Adventures of Tom Bombadil began as a single poem, inspired by a Dutch doll belonging to Tolkien's son, Michael. Tolkien wrote the poem as a form of entertainment for his children, but by 1934 it had been published in The Oxford Magazine. In October 1961, Tolkien's aunt Jane Neave encouraged him to put together a small book which would have "Tom Bombadil at the heart of it." Tolkien took her advice and a year later Allen & Unwin published The Adventures of Tom Bombadil. It contains both older works, such as "Oliphaunt" (1927), and works written specifically for the book, such as "Tom Bombadil Goes Boating" (1962). The collection has connections to Tolkien's trilogy The Lord of the Rings. There are a few points in the trilogy where the main characters recite or sing the poems in The Adventures of Tom Bombadil. Frodo sings “The Man in the Moon Stayed Up Too Late,” during his stay at The Prancing Pony in Bree, and Samwise recites “Oliphaunt” during a battle. The title character of the poems, Tom Bombadil, appears on several occasions in the series, one time being when he rescues Frodo from the Barrow-wights in The Fellowship of the Ring.

Farmer Giles of Ham, a tale about a “semilegendary England,” grew out of Tolkien's curiosity about the etymology of place-names, particularly the name “Worminghall.” Like The Adventures of Tom Bombadil, it was originally a story which he told to his children, but which was later published. The year of publication was 1949, the same year that Tolkien finished The Lord of the Rings. It is generally considered to be a light, comical read in which Tolkien “laughs good-humoredly at much that is taken most seriously by his epic.” Tolkien was a professor of Anglo-Saxon in Oxford at the time, and scholars assert that Tolkien wrote Farmer Giles of Ham as a mockery of the discipline of philology, which was his area of expertise.

Other works, such as “On Fairy Stories” and “The Homecoming of Beorhtnoth Beorhthelm's Son” were contributions to academia. Tolkien was a professor of English Language and Literature, and “On Fairy Stories” was initially a lecture, delivered in 1939 at the University of St. Andrews. "Leaf by Niggle", first published in 1945, is a short story that Tolkien wrote to accompany "On Fairy Stories", and which has been described as an autobiographical allegory.

“The Homecoming of Beorhtnoth Beorhthelm's Son” was a submission for the English Association's Essays and Studies for 1953, which Tolkien wrote while he was teaching at the University of Oxford sometime before 1945.

Peter S. Beagle's five-part introduction "Tolkien's Magic Ring" serves as an accompaniment to works in The Tolkien Reader. Beagle was familiar with Tolkien's writing, having previously collaborated with Chris Conkling on a screenplay for The Lord of the Rings. In "Tolkien's Magic Ring", which was first published in Holiday Magazine in 1966, Beagle gives the reader a short summary of Tolkien's The Lord of the Rings trilogy.

== Contents ==
Title	Publication Date	Publication Location	Content	Type
"Publisher's Note"	1966	The Tolkien Reader, Ballantine Publishing Group	An overview of the contents of The Tolkien Reader. A short description is provided for each of the works contained within the book.	Overview
"Tolkien's Magic Ring"	1966	Holiday Magazine, Curtis Publishing	An introduction to the world of J. R. R. Tolkien by Peter S. Beagle. It provides short descriptions of J. R. R. Tolkien's books The Lord of the Rings and The Hobbit.	Introduction
"The Homecoming of Beorhtnoth Beorhthelm's Son"	1953	Essays and Studies for 1953, The English Association	I. "The Death of Beorhtnoth": the events of “Beorhtnoth’s Death” are outlined. Following this is an analysis of the Battle of Maldon, which was fought between the English and the Danes in 991.	Essay
"The Homecoming of Beorhtnoth Beorhthelm's Son"	1953	Essays and Studies for 1953, The English Association	II. "The Homecoming of Beorhtnoth Beorhthelm's Son": Torhthelm, a poet, and Tídwald, a farmer, go to the battlefield to retrieve the body of their slain master, Beorhtnoth. The men search through the bodies until they have found Beorhtnoth, whereafter they put the corpse on a wagon and travel to Ely. As they approach the abbey of Ely, they hear the monks singing a dirge.	Play
"The Homecoming of Beorhtnoth Beorhthelm's Son"	1953	Essays and Studies for 1953, The English Association	III. “Ofermod”: the concept of heroism is discussed and critiqued.	Essay
Tree and Leaf	1964	Tree and Leaf, George Allen & Unwin	"On Fairy-Stories": Tolkien discusses the definition, origin and purpose of fairy stories.	Essay
Tree and Leaf	1964	Tree and Leaf, George Allen & Unwin	"Leaf by Niggle": a painter named Niggle paints an elaborate picture of a tree. Duties and a journey eventually force Niggle to abandon his painting. A small fragment of the picture - depicting a single leaf - ends up in a museum. Niggle travels to the country of the Tree and Forest, the place which he had painted from afar.	Short story
Farmer Giles of Ham	1949	Farmer Giles of Ham, George Allen & Unwin	Ægidius Ahenobarbus Julius Agricola de Hammo, known colloquially as Farmer Giles of Ham, wakes up to find that a giant has killed his cow. Giles manages to drive the giant away but is later forced to take action again when a dragon attacks the kingdom. Giles manages to build an alliance with the dragon and win his hoard of gold. In the end he builds his own “Little Kingdom”, which he rules over.	Short story
The Adventures of Tom Bombadil	1962	The Adventures of Tom Bombadil, George Allen & Unwin	Sixteen poems including "Errantry", "The Man in the Moon Stayed Up Too Late", "Fastitocalon", and "The Sea-Bell", with a frame story preface that pretends Tolkien found the poems.	Poetry

== Critical reception ==
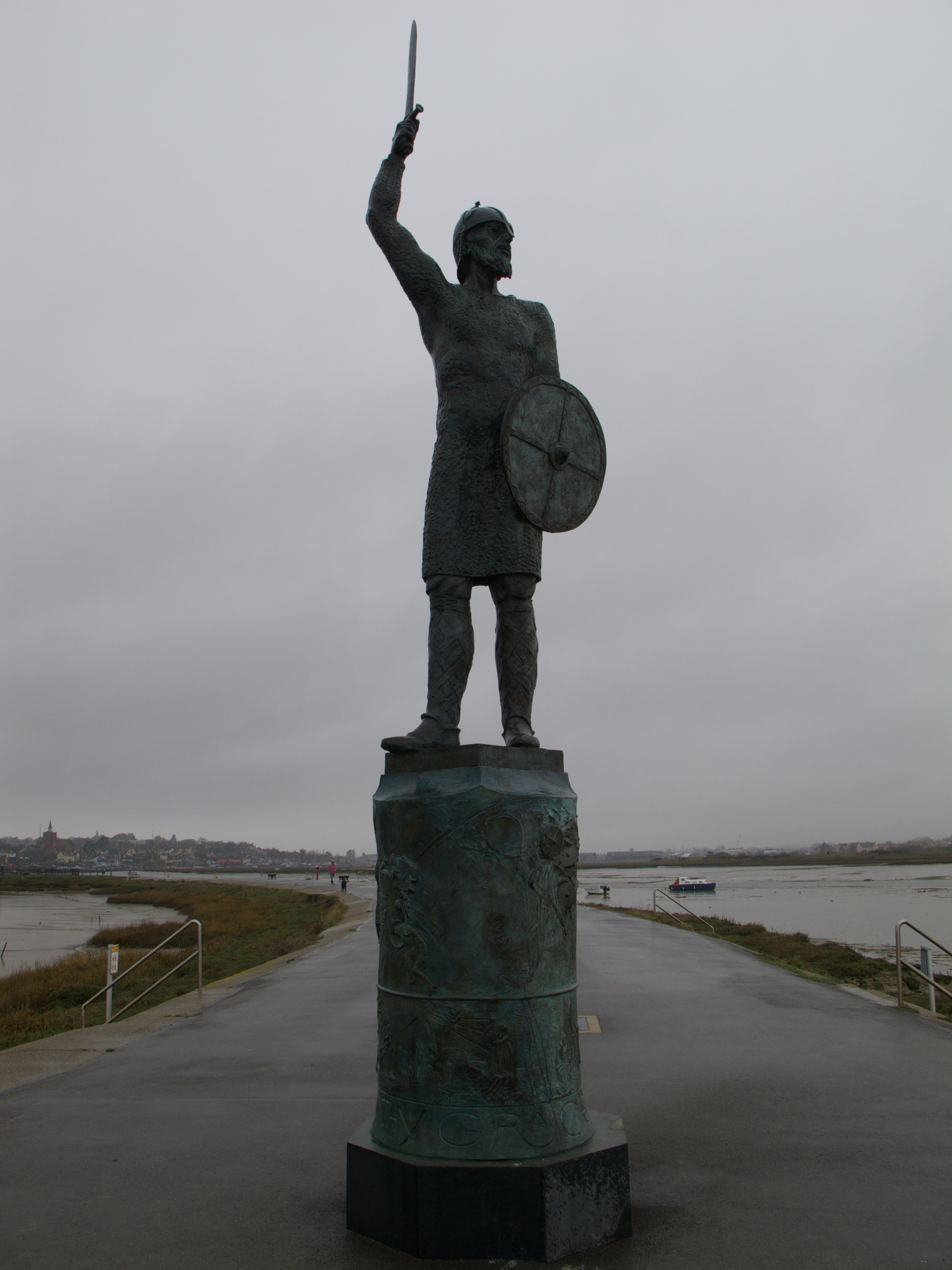
The English earl Beorhtnoth, who fought in the Battle of Maldon. He is the titular character of Tolkien's essay and play "The Homecoming of Beorhtnoth Beorhthelm's Son."

"On Fairy-Stories" has received both praise and criticism from scholars. Tom Shippey describes the essay as "Tolkien’s least successful if most discussed piece of argumentative prose" and as coming “perilously close to whimsy”. J. Reilly proposes that the essay can be used as a guide for understanding Tolkien's trilogy The Lord of the Rings. He makes the case that “the genre and the meaning of the trilogy are to be found in his essay on fairy stories.” Another scholar, Tanya Caroline Wood, calls attention to the similarities between Tolkien's “Of Fairy-Stories” and Sir Philip Sidney's Defense of Poesy. She qualifies both writers as “Renaissance Men,” based on her observation that both of their works demonstrate elements of Renaissance philosophy.

"The Homecoming of Beorhtnoth Beorhthelm's Son" too has received scholarly attention. Shippey praises the work, arguing that Tolkien's interpretation of The Battle of Maldon is one of the few to correctly identify the poem's main message.

In his essay "J.R.R. Tolkien and the True Hero", George Clark writes about how works like “Homecoming” demonstrate Tolkien's fascination with Anglo-Saxon literature. He points out what he believes to be an incongruence between Tolkien's Catholic faith and his obsession with narratives that have "no explicitly Christian references".

== Adaptations ==
Radio adaptations of Farmer Giles of Ham and Leaf by Niggle were included in the BBC Radio 5 series Tales from a Perilous Realm. The recording was released in 1993. These two works have also been made into theatrical dramatisations in Sweden and the Netherlands.

In 2016, The Puppet State Theatre Company premiered a theatrical rendition of Leaf by Niggle, and they have performed the play several times since.

== Editions ==
Del Rey Books, an imprint of The Random House Publishing Group, released a second edition of The Tolkien Reader in 1986.

== Similar collections ==
Among similar collections of Tolkien's minor works are Poems and Stories (Allen & Unwin 1980, illustrated by Pauline Baynes) and Tales from the Perilous Realm (HarperCollins 1997, without illustrations; revised edition illustrated by Alan Lee, 2008).

== Sources ==
- Shippey, Tom (2005) [1982]. The Road to Middle-Earth: How J. R. R. Tolkien Created a New Mythology (Third ed.). HarperCollins. ISBN 978-0-261-10275-0.
