= Roverandom =

Novella by J. R. R. Tolkien

- Hardback edition, featuring Tolkien's illustration of a fantasized moonscape
- Editor: Christina Scull & Wayne G. Hammond
- Author: J. R. R. Tolkien
- Language: English
- Genre: Children's literature
- Publisher: HarperCollins (UK)
- Publication date: 1998
- Publication place: United Kingdom
- Media type: Print (hardback and paperback)
- Pages: 144 (hardback)
- ISBN: 978-0007523283
- Preceded by: The Peoples of Middle-earth
- Followed by: The Children of Húrin

Roverandom is a novella by J. R. R. Tolkien, originally told in 1925, about the adventures of a young dog, Rover. In the story, an irritable wizard turns Rover into a toy, and Rover goes to the Moon and under the sea in order to find the wizard again to turn him back into a normal-sized dog. The author wrote Roverandom for his son Michael to amuse him upon the loss of his favourite toy, a little leaden dog which he lost on a beach of grey shingle stones the same size and colour as the toy. The work is in tone a children's story, but contains many allusions and references in the manner of Farmer Giles of Ham.

It was submitted for publication in 1937 after the success of The Hobbit, but was not published for over sixty years, finally being released in 1998. Roverandom was included in the collection Tales from the Perilous Realm from its 2009 reprinting onwards.

== Characters ==
=== Major ===
- Rover(andom) - The main character. A young puppy that is white with black ears. He is rather rude and excitable when first introduced. This is what causes him to irritate Artaxerxes in the first place.
- Mr. Artaxerxes Pam - The wizard who meets Roverandom while on holiday. Wears a green hat with a blue feather in it. Comes from Persia but got lost and now lives in Pershore.
- Psamathos Psamathides - The chief of all Psamathists (sand-sorcerers). He is described as being the size of a large dog and being very ugly, with long ears that stick up. Days and nights he hides closely under the surface of the cove's sands, taking a nap - or two. He snuggles himself into the sand as into a warm blanket and only comes out when the sky begins to look like teatime or when some amusement is going on: a dance of the mermaids, for example. Otherwise one can hardly find him, tucked up amidst the endlessly stretching covesands.
- Man-in-the-Moon - A friendly wizard whom Roverandom meets on the Moon. He is responsible for conjuring and protecting people's dreams.
- Moon-Rover - The Man-in-the-Moon's dog
- Sea-Rover - The dog under the Deep Blue Sea

=== Minor ===
- Tinker - The cat whom Rover lived with before becoming a toy
- Two - The boy who owned Rover as a toy. An allusion to Michael Tolkien, the author's second son
- Great White Dragon - The chief of the Moon's dragons
- Sea-serpent
- Uin - The Right Whale that takes Roverandom under the Deep Blue Sea
- Two's grandmother - Roverandom's first owner. It is revealed at the end that she is the grandmother of Two
- Mer-king - ruler of the mer-folk
- Mrs. Artaxerxes Pam - Daughter of the mer-king and wife of Artaxerxes

== Places ==
- The Moon - Rover goes to the Moon seeking the Man-in-the-Moon's help. The Moon is highly fantasized; envisioned by Tolkien as a place full of mythical creatures reminiscent of those found in the works of Lewis Carroll. Traits of the Moon's trees foreshadow those of the mallorn trees of Lothlórien.
- Cove of the sand-sorcerer - Where Psamathos lives and Roverandom is accidentally left by Boy Two. It is located on the north-east coast of England. Its description as a "queer cove", an allusion to the English expression meaning 'odd fellow, rogue', is one of many plays-on-words in the book.
- Isle of Lost Dogs - An island Mew and Rover fly over on the way to the moon. Mew describes it as a place lucky or deserving lost dogs go. A place where they can make as much noise as they want, with bone trees growing everywhere. It is a fanciful allusion to the Isle of Dogs and the Dogger Bank.
- Deep Blue Sea - The mer-king's realm
- Faery: the tale's brief glimpse of the Shadowy Seas and Elvenhome links it to Tolkien's Middle-earth legendarium.

== Sources ==
- Tolkien, J. R. R., Roverandom. London: HarperCollins, 1998.
