= Tree and Leaf =

1964 book by J. R. R. Tolkien

- First edition
- Author: J. R. R. Tolkien
- Illustrator: Pauline Baynes
- Genre: Essay
- Publisher: George Allen and Unwin
- Publication date: 28 May 1964
- Publication place: United Kingdom
- Preceded by: The Adventures of Tom Bombadil
- Followed by: The Tolkien Reader

Tree and Leaf is a small anthology of works by J. R. R. Tolkien published in 1964 and originally illustrated by Pauline Baynes which consisted of:

- a revised version of an essay called "On Fairy-Stories" (originally published in 1947 in Essays Presented to Charles Williams)
- an allegorical short story called "Leaf by Niggle" (originally published in the Dublin Review in 1945).

Both pieces were re-issued in the collection The Tolkien Reader (1966), and have also appeared in various subsequent collections.

Tolkien's poem "Mythopoeia" was added to the 1988 second edition (ISBN 0395502322), and his poem "The Homecoming of Beorhtnoth Beorhthelm's Son" was added in the 2001 third edition (ISBN 9780007105045).
