= The Sea-Bell =

Poem by J.R.R. Tolkien

"The Sea-Bell" or "Frodos Dreme" is a poem with elaborate rhyme scheme and metre by J.R.R. Tolkien in his 1962 collection of verse The Adventures of Tom Bombadil. It was a revision of a 1934 poem called "Looney". The first-person narrative speaks of finding a white shell "like a sea-bell", and of being carried away to a strange and beautiful land.

The poet W. H. Auden thought it Tolkien's finest poem. It has been related to the Irish immram tradition of tales and medieval dream vision poetry. The scholar of English literature Verlyn Flieger calls the poem "a cry of longing for lost beauty", and relates it to the sense of alienation many of Tolkien's generation felt on returning from the First World War.

== Background ==
The work is based on an earlier poem entitled "Looney", which Tolkien had published in The Oxford Magazine in 1934. The 1962 version of the poem is considerably darker than, and twice as long as, the earlier version. Tolkien was initially reluctant to include the work in the collection, feeling that it was out of keeping with the other poems. Although "Looney" was composed long before Tolkien began work on The Lord of the Rings, the 1962 version is subtitled "Frodos Dreme". Tolkien's mock-academic framing of the collection suggests that, although the poem may not have been composed by Frodo Baggins, it was associated with him by its readers and reflects the dark dreams that plagued him in his final days in the Shire.

== Narrative ==
Lines from the poem

I walked by the sea, and there came to me,
as a star-beam on the wet sand,
a white shell like a sea-bell;
trembling it lay in my wet hand...

Then I saw a boat silently float
On the night-tide, empty and grey...

It bore me away, wetted with spray,
wrapped in a mist, wound in a sleep,
to a forgotten strand in a strange land.
In the twilight beyond the deep
I heard a sea-bell swing in the swell,...

The poem is a first person narrative by a speaker who is never identified in the main body of the poem. Tolkien's rhyme scheme and metre are highly elaborate.

"The Sea-Bell" opens with the speaker coming across a white shell "like a sea-bell" as he walks by the shore. He hears the sound of distant harbours and seas as he holds the shell in his hand. Suddenly a boat appears and he is borne away "to a forgotten strand in a strange land./ In the twilight beyond the deep".

The land he arrives in is glittering, beautiful and mysterious. He hears the sound of distant music, voices and footfalls, but when he seeks the source of the sound the mysterious inhabitants of the land flee from him. Climbing onto a mound he presumptuously names himself king of the land and challenges its people to come forth. Darkness descends upon him and he falls to the ground, blinded and bent. For a year and a day afterwards he dwells in the wood "wandering in wit" and growing grey and old.

Eventually, broken and weary, he seeks out the sea and boards a ship that will take him back to his own land. However, when he arrives home the sea-bell no longer carries sounds from over the sea to him. The poem ends on a note of anguish as the speaker finds himself alienated from his own world, misunderstood and forsaken by those he once knew. The final image is of the narrator walking along a dark, rainy street talking to himself "for still they speak not, men that I meet".

== Themes and reception ==
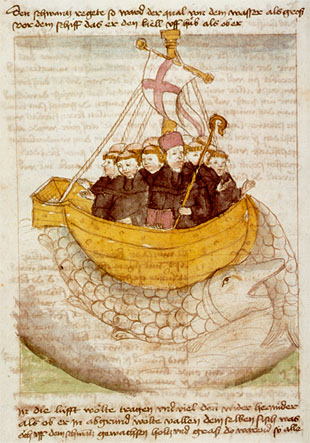
The poem has been related to the Celtic immram and the voyage of the Irish monk Saint Brendan (pictured).

The poem touches on many themes which are recurrent in Tolkien's work: mortality, the otherworld, alienation, desire, suffering, pride, the sea and nature.

The poet W. H. Auden wrote to Tolkien, in a March 1967 letter, that he considered "The Sea-Bell" his "finest" poetic work, calling it "wonderful"; Tolkien replied that the praise "really made me wag my tail". Years prior, Tolkien had written to his illustrator, Pauline Baynes, that the poem was "the poorest" among several writings he had sent her.

Norma Roche writes that the poem, along with "The Last Ship", are both full of regret for the loss of the Blessed Realm, and relates them to the Celtic immram tradition of tales about a hero's sea journey to the Otherworld; she notes indeed that Tolkien wrote a 1955 poem called Imram about the voyage of the Irish monk Saint Brendan.

Michael D. C. Drout suggests that the poem that follows it in The Adventures of Tom Bombadil, "The Last Ship", is a companion piece. Other scholars have noted that Tolkien wrote a series of works featuring Irish Otherworld voyages, including his childhood Roverandom and the later "Bilbo's Last Song".

The scholar of English literature Verlyn Flieger calls the poem "a cry of longing for lost beauty", and relates the poem to the sense of alienation many of Tolkien's generation felt on returning from the First World War, but notes that it differs from many literary responses to the war by operating 'in the fantastic mode, rather than the realistic'. She has also argued that the final association of "The Sea-Bell" with Frodo gives the poem considerably more depth than it had in its 1934 recension and adds much to our understanding of the central character of The Lord of the Rings.

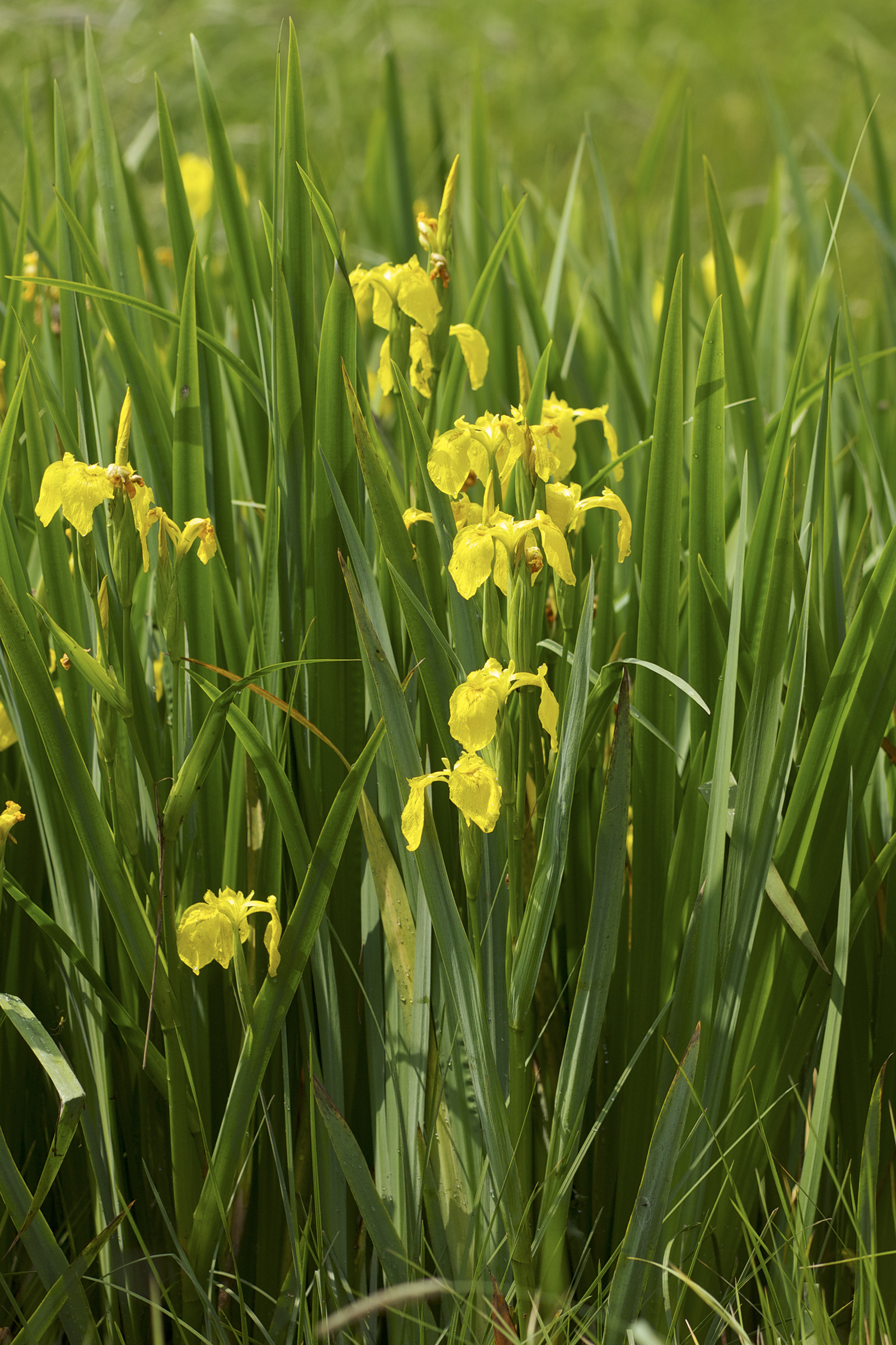
The revised poem mentions "gladdon-swords", leaves of the yellow iris, an ominous echo of Isildur's death in the Gladden Fields that led ultimately to the War of the Ring.

The Tolkien scholar Tom Shippey calls the addition of the subtitle "Frodos Dreme" to the poem, and the fictional editorial introduction, a "striking revision", because it attached the poem as a piece of imaginary prehistory of Hobbits, making them originally mariners, rather than the "Earth-fast" beings they otherwise are in Middle-earth. He notes the "increasing darkness" in the poem's revision, along with a mention of "gladdon-swords" (the blade-like leaves of the waterside yellow iris): an ominous mention, as Isildur, the man who cut the One Ring from the Dark Lord's hand, died in the Gladden Fields. In Shippey's view, however, a bigger change is that the revision makes the speaker seem guilty, apparently because he presumed to call himself "king"; and that guilt changes the end of the poem, from still having a shell with the voice of the sea, to a "silent and dead" one. The change goes with a ban on returning to Faery, just as the subtitle "Frodos Dreme" is a reminder of Frodo's final sense of loss and defeat in The Lord of the Rings. Shippey suggests that Tolkien, too, had come to doubt his theory of "sub-creation", which held that since creativity came from God, literary creation too was ultimately from God; but "by the 1960s, ... he no longer imagined himself rejoining his own creations after death, like Niggle; he felt they were lost, like the Silmarils.

Sue Bridgwater compares the poem to W. B. Yeats's 1891 poem "The Man who Dreamed of Faeryland", with Dream Vision narrative and Faery as references. Both, she writes, place the realm of Faery on an island across the western sea, with trees or forests; as in Tolkien's forested Elvish land of Lothlórien, time passes differently in "The Sea-Bell". Compared to "Looney", the poem is twice as long, and, she notes, both Flieger and Shippey find it "darker and more despairing", attributes true also of Yeats's poem. Both Tolkien and Yeats were dissatisfied with the poems. Both, Bridgwater states, bring out the otherworldly with words suggesting light and shade: Tolkien with "stars", "white", "glimmer", "glitter", "gleaming"; Yeats with "silver" and "gold" in each of his first three verses, words that Tolkien uses once each. Where Tolkien uses positive, even romantic images of nature, with " green-ness, water, heart's ease, flowers, star, river, animals and birds", Yeats uses lowly, even disgusting organisms: dead fish, a lugworm, knot-grass, worms. Both open with a collision of the known and unknown worlds, Tolkien's "I walked by the sea", Yeats's different in each verse, as in "He wandered by the sands" or "He mused beside the well". Both are vague as to where the Otherland might be; and in both, the dream turns to a nightmare. Bridgwater writes that the theme of vanishing Faery is traditional and that Tolkien used it not just in The Sea-Bell (lines 53ff) but in The Hobbit where the Hobbit and Dwarves, lost in the great forest of Mirkwood, try vainly to approach the Elves, just as the medieval Sir Orfeo sees the King of Elfland's hunt go past at a distance: being lost in a haunted forest poetically parallels being out of one's mind.
