= Mythopoeia (poem) =

Poem by J. R. R. Tolkien

"Mythopoeia" is a poem by J.R.R. Tolkien. The word mythopoeia means myth-making, and has been used in English since at least 1846.

== Origins ==
J. R. R. Tolkien wrote "Mythopoeia" following a discussion on the night of 19 September 1931 that took place at Magdalen College, Oxford with C. S. Lewis and Hugo Dyson. Lewis said that myths were "lies breathed through silver". Tolkien's poem explained and defended creative myth-making. The discussion was recorded in the book The Inklings by Humphrey Carpenter. The poem features words from "Philomythos" (myth-lover) to "Misomythos" (myth-hater) who defends mythology and myth-making as a creative art about "fundamental things". It begins by addressing C. S. Lewis as the Misomythos, who at the time was sceptical of any truth in mythology:

To one who said that myths were lies and therefore worthless, even though "breathed through silver".

== Analysis ==
Tolkien chose to compose the poem in heroic couplets, the preferred metre of British Enlightenment poets, as it was attacking the proponents of materialist progress ("progressive apes") on their own turf:

I will not walk with your progressive apes,
erect and sapient. Before them gapes
the dark abyss to which their progress tends—...

The poem refers to the creative human author as "the little maker" wielding his "own small golden sceptre" ruling his subcreation (understood as genuine creation within God's primary creation):

Your world immutable wherein no part
the little maker has with maker's art.
I bow not yet before the Iron Crown,
nor cast my own small golden sceptre down...

The reference to not bowing before "the Iron Crown", and later reference rejecting "the great Artefact" have been interpreted as Tolkien's opposition and resistance to accept what he perceived to be modern man's misplaced "faith" or "worship" of a kind of rationalism, and "progress" when defined by science and technology. Tolkien further built upon this theme in The Silmarillion, in which the Luciferian figure of Morgoth is said to have embedded the stolen silmarils – the last source of unsullied light in Arda – within his iron crown. It is through coerced worship of Morgoth that his servant Sauron is later able to bring about the destruction by Ilúvatar of the Númenorean people, an event analogous with the fall of Atlantis (and The Fall at large). Tolkien continues:

man ...keeps the rags of lordship once he owned,
his world-dominion by creative act:
not his to worship the great Artefact.

"Mythopoeia" takes the position that mythology contains spiritual and foundational truths, while myth-making is a "creative act" that helps narrate and disclose those truths:

...There is no firmament,
only a void, unless a jewelled tent
myth-woven and elf-patterned; and no earth,
unless the mother's womb whence all have birth.

Verlyn Flieger writes that the theme of light is significant in the poem, as elsewhere in Tolkien's work, especially The Silmarillion. The light, emanating from the Creator, is, in her view, splintered and passed on through every author's works in the act of subcreation.

== Publication ==
The complete poem was first published in the 1988 edition of Tree and Leaf.

== See also ==
- Inklings
- List of poems by J. R. R. Tolkien
- Mythopoeia
- Poetry in The Lord of the Rings
