= On Fairy-Stories =

Essay by J. R. R. Tolkien

- Author: J. R. R. Tolkien
- Genre: Essay
- Publisher: Oxford University Press
- Publication date: 4 December 1947
- Media type: Print, in Essays Presented to Charles Williams
- Preceded by: "Leaf by Niggle"
- Followed by: "Farmer Giles of Ham"

"On Fairy-Stories" is a 1947 essay by J. R. R. Tolkien which discusses the fairy story as a literary form. It was written as a lecture entitled "Fairy Stories" for the Andrew Lang lecture at the University of St Andrews, Scotland, on 8 March 1939.

The essay is significant because it contains Tolkien's explanation of his philosophy on fantasy, and his thoughts on mythopoeia and sub-creation or worldbuilding. Alongside his 1936 essay "Beowulf: The Monsters and the Critics", it is his most influential scholarly work.

Several scholars have used "On Fairy-Stories" as a route to understanding Tolkien's own fantasy, The Lord of the Rings, complete with its sub-created world of Middle-earth. Clyde Northrup contends that in the essay, Tolkien argues that "fairy-story" must contain four qualities, namely fantasy, recovery, escape, and consolation. Derek Shank argues that while Tolkien objects to structuralism in the essay, Tolkien also proposes that a secondary world must have a structure with coherently related parts; but since it works by its effect on the reader, humans are inside the structure and cannot analyse it objectively.

== Context ==
J. R. R. Tolkien was a professional philologist and an author of fantasy fiction, starting with the children's book The Hobbit in 1937. The Andrew Lang Lecture was important as it brought him to clarify his view of fairy stories as a legitimate literary genre, rather than something intended exclusively for children. By the time of the lecture, The Hobbit had become extremely popular, and Tolkien had started work on a sequel, which became The Lord of the Rings.

== History ==
Tolkien created the material as a lecture entitled "Fairy Stories"; he delivered it as the Andrew Lang lecture at the University of St Andrews, Scotland, on 8 March 1939.

"On Fairy-Stories" first appeared in print, with some enhancement, in 1947, in a festschrift volume, Essays Presented to Charles Williams, compiled by C. S. Lewis. Charles Williams, a friend of Lewis's, had been relocated with the Oxford University Press staff from London to Oxford during the London blitz in World War II. This allowed him to participate in gatherings of the Inklings with Lewis and Tolkien. The volume of essays was intended to be presented to Williams upon the return of the Oxford University Press staff to London with the ending of the war. However, Williams died suddenly on 15 May 1945, and the book was published as a memorial volume. Essays Presented to Charles Williams received little attention and was out of print by 1955.

"On Fairy-Stories" began to receive much more attention in 1964, when it was published in Tree and Leaf. Since then, Tree and Leaf has been reprinted several times, and "On Fairy-Stories" has been reprinted in other compilations of Tolkien's works, such as The Tolkien Reader in 1966, though that edition was impaired by poor proofreading. It appeared again in the 1980 Poems and Stories, and in the 1983 The Monsters and the Critics, and Other Essays. "On Fairy Stories" was published on its own in an expanded edition in 2008.

== Synopsis ==
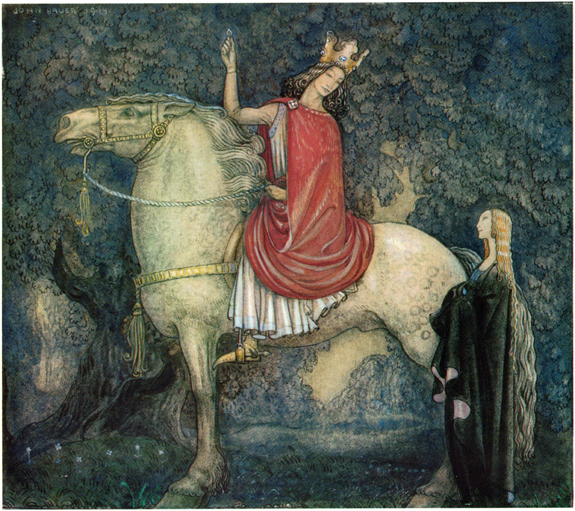
In the essay, Tolkien distinguished fairy tales from what he considered separate genres like beast fables and dream stories. Illustration for Helena Nyblom's fairy tale "The Ring" by John Bauer, 1914

The essay "On Fairy-Stories" is an attempt to explain and defend the genre of fairy tales, under the following headings.

=== Fairy-story ===
Tolkien distinguishes fairy tales from "traveller's tales" (such as Gulliver's Travels), science fiction (such as H. G. Wells's The Time Machine), beast fables (such as Aesop's Fables and The Tale of Peter Rabbit), and dream stories (such as Alice in Wonderland).

Tolkien claims that one touchstone of the authentic fairy tale is that it is presented as wholly credible: "It is at any rate essential to a genuine fairy-story, as distinct from the employment of this form for lesser or debased purposes, that it should be presented as 'true'. ... But since the fairy-story deals with 'marvels', it cannot tolerate any frame or machinery suggesting that the whole framework in which they occur is a figment or illusion."

=== Origins ===
Tolkien comments that fairy stories are ancient, and that it was once thought that they had derived from powerful, elemental "nature-myths", with gods personifying the sun, night, and other elements of nature. These myths were humanised to legends by telling them with human heroes as protagonists. Finally, the legends dwindled to folktales and fairy stories. But in Tolkien's view, this is "almost upside down". A tale of the Norse god Thor in the Elder Edda, the Thrymskvitha, is "certainly just a fairy-story"; it is just as old as the Norse myths. The historical King Arthur, perhaps a minor figure, went into the "Cauldron of Story", and "was boiled for a long time", eventually becoming a "King of Faërie". Tolkien notes that these old stories produce an effect of "distance and a great abyss of time", and suggests that they were selected precisely because they created this literary effect.

=== Children ===
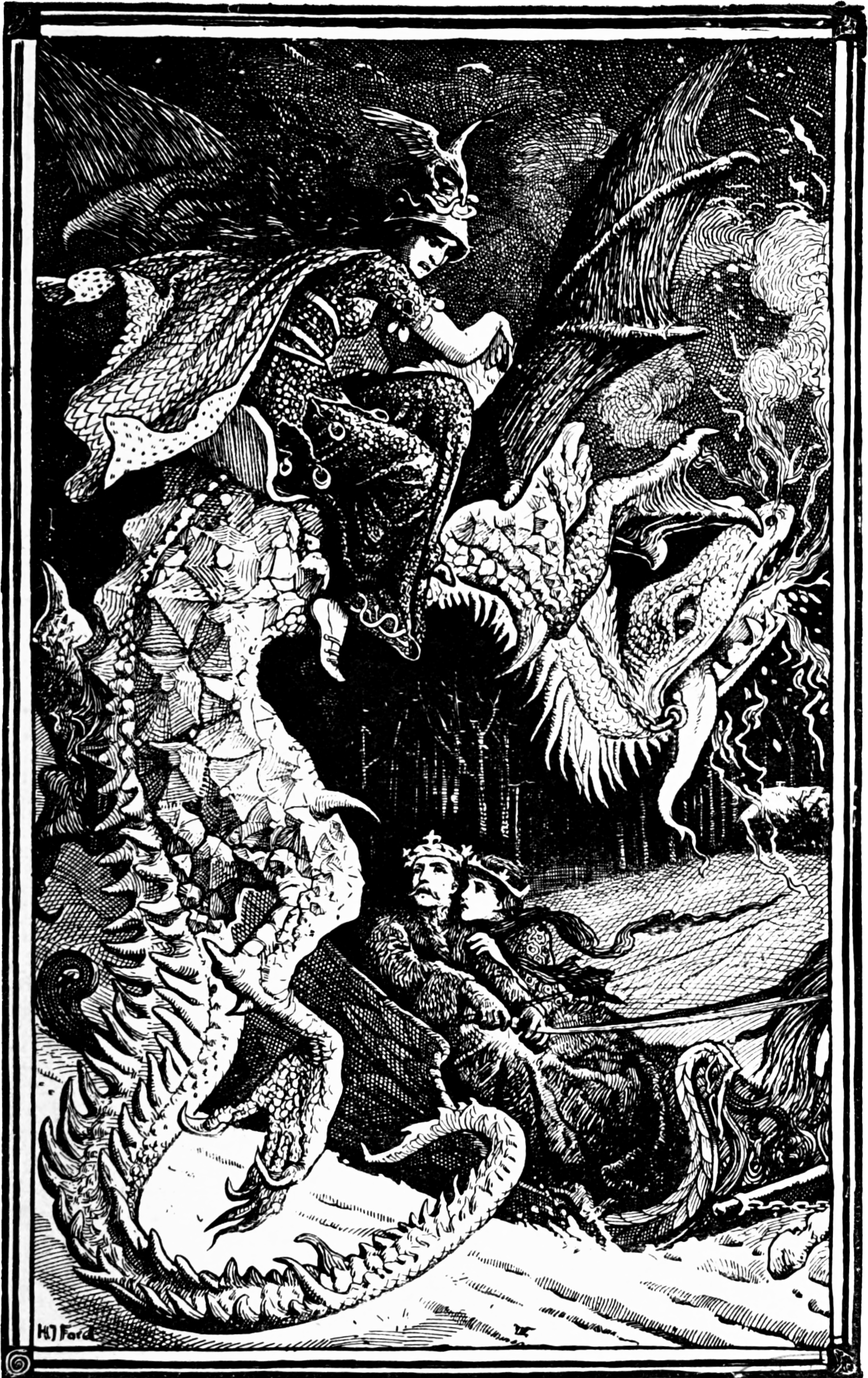
An illustration in Andrew Lang's The Green Fairy Book

Tolkien argues that there is no essential connection between fairy stories and children, but that this "is an accident of our domestic history", meaning that they have been relegated "to the nursery" because adults no longer wanted them. Only some children, he writes, "have any special taste for them", and he suggests that the taste "increases with age, if it is innate". He criticises Andrew Lang's suggestion that children have an "unblunted edge of belief" as trading on their credulity and inexperience. As an infant, when the Green Fairy Book was published, Tolkien says he had "no special 'wish to believe'. I wanted to know." On the other hand, fairy stories did awaken desire, such as for dragons. He had no time for Lang's talking down to children, or for "covertly sniggering". He notes that G. K. Chesterton remarked that children are not uncritically tender: "For children are innocent and love justice; while most of us are wicked and naturally prefer mercy."

=== Fantasy ===
Tolkien emphasises that through the use of fantasy, which he equates with imagination, the author can bring the reader to experience a world that is consistent and rational, under rules other than those of the normal world. He calls this "a rare achievement of Art", and notes that it was important to him as a reader: "It was in fairy-stories that I first divined the potency of the words, and the wonder of things, such as stone, and wood, and iron; tree and grass; house and fire; bread and wine."

=== Recovery, Escape, Consolation ===
Tolkien suggests that fairy stories allow the reader to review his own world from the "perspective" of a different world. Tolkien calls this "recovery", in the sense that one's unquestioned assumptions might be recovered and changed by an outside perspective. Second, he defends fairy stories as offering escapist pleasure to the reader, justifying this analogy: a prisoner is not obliged to think of nothing but cells and wardens. And third, Tolkien suggests that fairy stories can provide moral or emotional consolation, through their happy ending, which he terms a "eucatastrophe".

=== Epilogue ===
In conclusion, Tolkien asserts that a truly good fairy story is marked by joy: "Far more powerful and poignant is the effect [of joy] in a serious tale of Faërie. In such stories, when the sudden 'turn' comes we get a piercing glimpse of joy, and heart's desire, that for a moment passes outside the frame, rends indeed the very web of story, and lets a gleam come through." Tolkien sees Christianity as partaking in and fulfilling the overarching mythological nature of the cosmos:

I would venture to say that approaching the Christian Story from this direction, it has long been my feeling (a joyous feeling) that God redeemed the corrupt making-creatures, men, in a way fitting to this aspect, as to others, of their strange nature. The Gospels contain a fairy-story, or a story of a larger kind which embraces all the essence of fairy-stories. They contain many marvels ... and among the marvels is the greatest and most complete conceivable eucatastrophe. The Birth of Christ is the eucatastrophe of Man's history. The Resurrection is the eucatastrophe of the story of the Incarnation.

== Analysis ==
The Tolkien scholar Verlyn Flieger states that "On Fairy-Stories" would be at the centre of Tolkien research simply because it is Tolkien's own explanation of his art, of the "sub-creation" (in his terminology) of a secondary world. She at once adds that it is much more than that, since it is "a deeply perceptive commentary on the interdependence of language and human consciousness", a useful summary of the study of folklore at that time, and a "cogent" analysis of myth, fairy-story, and "the poet's craft". It is also, Flieger writes, an essential text for study of "the multivalent myth, epic and fairy tale romance that is The Lord of the Rings." In her view, alongside his 1936 essay "Beowulf: The Monsters and the Critics", the essay is his most influential scholarly work. In the lecture, Tolkien focused on Andrew Lang's work on fairy tales. He disagreed with Lang's broad inclusion of traveller's tales, beast fables, and other types of stories in his 1889–1910 Fairy Books collection. Tolkien viewed fairy stories more narrowly as those that took place in the enchanted realm of Faerie, with or without fairies as characters. He disagreed with both Lang and Max Müller in their theories of the development of the fairy story, which he viewed as a natural result of the way that imagination and language interact in the human mind.

The folklorist Juliette Wood, writing in A Companion to J. R. R. Tolkien, comments that the image of Galadriel's creating her magic mirror by pouring water illustrated how central the "imaginative reworking of reality" was to the theory of fantasy that Tolkien set out in the essay. Carl Phelpstead, also writing in the Companion, notes that the essay attempts to answer three questions, namely what fairy-tales are, their origins, and their value, the last of these related to Tolkien's concept of mythopoeia.

Clyde Northrup argues that through the essay Tolkien creates a framework of four necessary qualities for interpreting "Tolkienian fantasy", or as he called it "fairy-story". These are fantasy (the contrast of enchantment and ordinariness), recovery (as the reader sees the "magic" of simple things in daily life), escape (from the primary world), and consolation (the "happy ending"). He suggests that these can be applied both to Tolkien's own Middle-earth fantasies, The Hobbit and The Lord of the Rings, and to the works of later fantasy authors including David Eddings, Roger Zelazny, Stephen R. Donaldson, and J. K. Rowling.

Derek Shank, in Tolkien Studies, argues that while "On Fairy-Stories" criticises the application of structuralism to folklore, since "being bound up in the transcendental, it cannot account for the transcendent", Tolkien actually uses a similar analysis to relate "human beings, language, stories, and the external world." Shank notes that in the essay, Tolkien states that fantastic language alone, in his words "the green sun", is not enough to create fantasy. Instead, the green sun will only become believable, Shank writes, when the author, the sub-creator or worldbuilder, "construct[s] the Secondary World to form a coherent and organic whole in which all the parts are harmoniously interrelated—in other words, a structure."

Shank concludes, however, that Tolkien moves away from structuralism in the essay's epilogue, by likening fairy stories to the Gospel, which (he writes) has a profound effect on the people who hear it, whether they accept or reject it. Thus, Shank writes, Tolkien goes from structure to a story's effects, "the realm of phenomenology and psychoanalysis." These too may have structure, but since humans are now inside that structure, people cannot analyse it, or fairy stories, objectively.

== Sources ==
- Carpenter, Humphrey, ed. (2023) [1981]. The Letters of J. R. R. Tolkien: Revised and Expanded Edition. New York: HarperCollins. ISBN 978-0-35-865298-4.
