= The Homecoming of Beorhtnoth Beorhthelm's Son =

1953 J. R. R. Tolkien poem

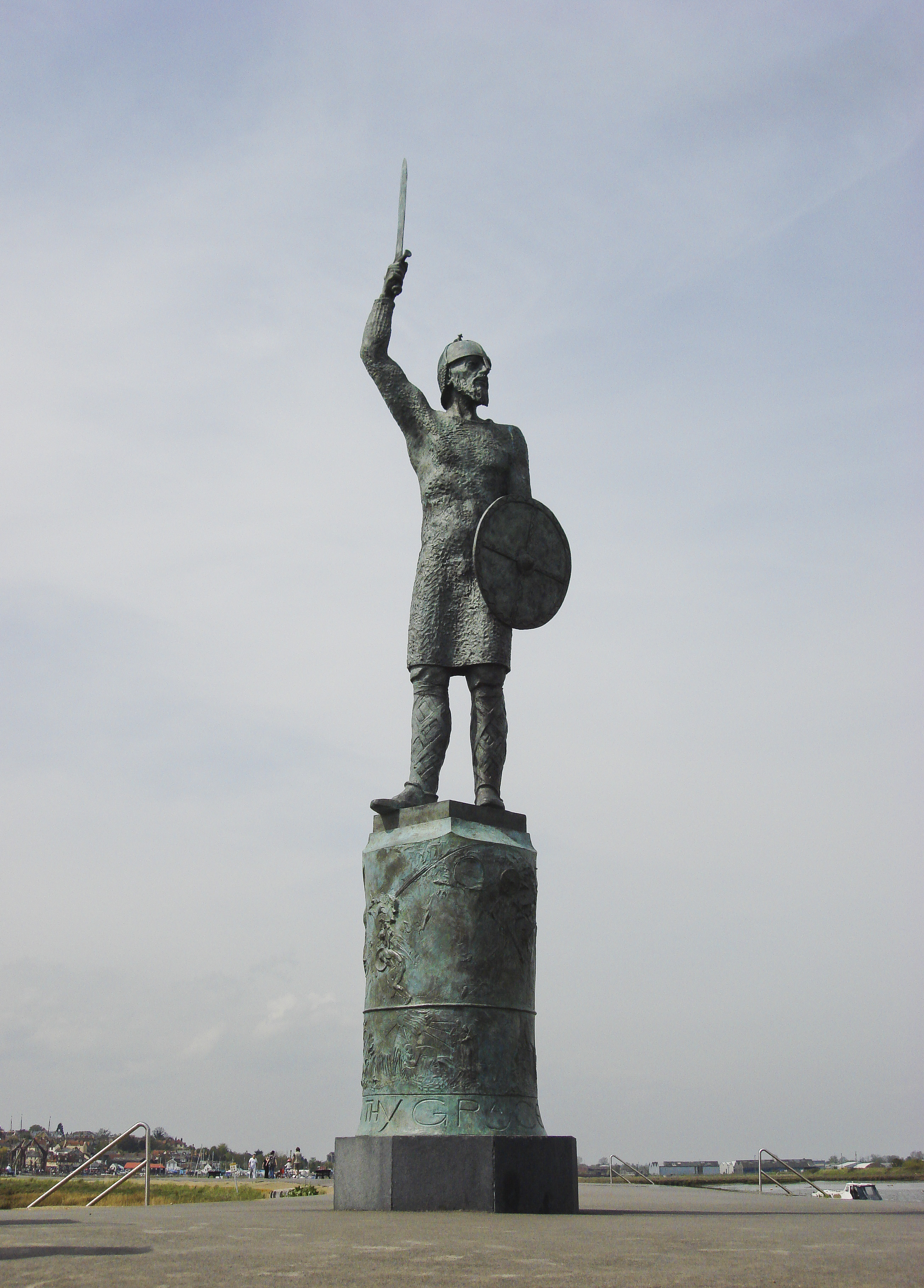
- Statue of Beorhtnoth in Maldon, Essex
- Author: J. R. R. Tolkien
- Language: English
- Genre: play-script (historical fiction) in verse, & commentary
- Publication date: October 1953
- Publication place: United Kingdom
- Media type: Print
- Preceded by: Farmer Giles of Ham
- Followed by: The Lord of the Rings

The Homecoming of Beorhtnoth Beorhthelm's Son is a work by J. R. R. Tolkien originally published in 1953 in volume 6 of the scholarly journal Essays and Studies by Members of the English Association, and later republished in 1966 in The Tolkien Reader; it is also included in the most recent edition of Tree and Leaf. It is a work of historical fiction, inspired by the Old English poem The Battle of Maldon.

It is written in the form of an alliterative poem, but is also a play, being mainly a dialogue between two characters in the aftermath of the Battle of Maldon. The work was accompanied by two essays, also by Tolkien, one before and one after the main work. The work, as published, was thus presented in three parts:

- "Beorhtnoth's Death" — an introductory essay concerning the battle and the Old English fragment that inspired Tolkien.
- The Homecoming of Beorhtnoth Beorhthelm's Son — the alliterative poem.
- "Ofermod" — an essay following on from the main work, discussing the meaning of the Old English word ofermod "overconfidence, foolhardiness".

== Plot ==
The play itself is the story of two characters, Tidwald (Tida) and Torhthelm (Totta), retrieving the body of Beorhtnoth, Ealdorman of Essex, from the battlefield at Maldon. After a brief search they eventually find their lord's battle-mangled body and his golden sword. In the middle of the action, Totta slays an English battlefield-looter, for which Tída chastises him. The murder provides an opportunity for the characters to discuss the ethics of Beorhtnoth's actions. Totta is a romantic who thinks Beorhtnoth's actions were tragically noble, while Tída is the battle-experienced farmer who takes the realist position, pointing out the folly of Beorhtnoth's decision to let the Vikings cross the causeway. Eventually the two characters load the lord's body onto a cart, and the drama closes with their leaving the battlefield for a nearby abbey in Ely.

== Analysis ==
The date that "Homecoming" was written is not quite certain. Tolkien's biographer Humphrey Carpenter writes that the work "was in existence by 1945." In a 1952 letter to his publisher, Tolkien mentioned that his heavy workload included "producing a contribution to Essays and Studies".

Literary critics generally agree that "Homecoming" is Tolkien's biting critique of the northern heroic ethos. For example, using Tolkien's original drafts of "Homecoming", Thomas Honegger makes the case that Tolkien was especially concerned with casting Beorhtnoth's pride in a wholly negative light. George Clark states that Tolkien's reworking of The Battle of Maldon specifically "chastises" Beorhtnoth for his pride and generally criticizes the Anglo-Saxon heroic ideals of pursuing fame and material wealth (41). Taking a similar position, Tom Shippey argues that Tolkien's condemnation of Beorhtnoth in "Homecoming" is "an act of parricide" against his Old English literary forebears, in which "[h]e had...to take 'the northern heroic spirit' and sacrifice it" (337).

Taking a more nuanced approach, Mary R. Bowman claims that Tolkien "rehabilitated" the northern heroic spirit, instead of simply "rejecting" it (92). She recalls Tolkien's own metaphor of the northern heroic spirit as an impure "alloy", composed of a combination of a self-sacrificing bravery for the good of others (the gold) and a selfish, reckless pursuit for wealth and fame (the base metal). Bowman's point, then, is that Tolkien was concerned with "refining" the heroic code—with separating and burning away the selfish, destructive slag of "overmastering" and excessive pride, while retaining the gold of courage. More positively, Anna Smol and Rebecca Foster call the work "an alliterative tour de force".

Scholars have discussed the influence of "Homecoming" on Tolkien's fictional world of Middle-earth. George Clark argues that Tolkien's ideas about the northern heroic spirit are manifested in The Lord of the Rings through the character Sam; in his steadfast, self-less devotion to Frodo, Sam serves as the "true hero", a kind of anti-Beorhtnoth. Likewise, Bowman claims that both Sam and Bilbo possess the "refined" brand of heroism that she thinks Tolkien is forging in "Homecoming". Other scholars have made similar cases; for example, Alexander Bruce argues that Gandalf's stand against the Balrog in Moria serves as Tolkien's correction of Beorhtnoth's tactical error, and Lynn Forest-Hill sees Beorhtnoth coming through in Boromir.

Alexander Bruce's comparison of Gandalf's stand in Moria with Byrhtnoth's action in the Battle of Maldon
Leader	Encounter	Action	Result
Byrhtnoth	Battle of Maldon	Allows Viking enemy across causeway	Army defeated, Byrhtnoth killed, English pay Danegeld tribute
Gandalf	Bridge of Khazad-dûm	Holds the bridge against the Balrog	Both Gandalf and the Balrog fall into the abyss. The Fellowship escape.

== Sources ==
- Carpenter, Humphrey (1977). J. R. R. Tolkien: A Biography. New York: Ballantine Books. ISBN 978-0-04-928037-3.
- Carpenter, Humphrey, ed. (2023) [1981]. The Letters of J. R. R. Tolkien: Revised and Expanded Edition. New York: HarperCollins. ISBN 978-0-35-865298-4.
