= Farmer Giles of Ham =

Book by J. R. R. Tolkien

- First edition cover
- Author: J. R. R. Tolkien
- Illustrator: Pauline Baynes
- Cover artist: Pauline Baynes
- Language: English
- Genre: Children's literature Fantasy fiction
- Publisher: George Allen & Unwin
- Publication date: 20 October 1949
- Publication place: United Kingdom
- Media type: Print (hardback & paperback)
- ISBN: 978-0-04-823068-3
- Preceded by: "On Fairy-Stories"
- Followed by: The Homecoming of Beorhtnoth Beorhthelm's Son

Farmer Giles of Ham is a comic medieval fable written by J. R. R. Tolkien in 1937 and published in 1949. The story describes the encounters between Farmer Giles and a wily dragon named Chrysophylax, and how Giles manages to use these to rise from humble beginnings to rival the king of the land. It is cheerfully anachronistic and light-hearted, set in Britain in an imaginary period of the Dark Ages. It features mythical creatures, medieval knights, and primitive firearms.

Scholars have noted that despite the story's light-hearted nature, reflected in Tolkien's playful use of his professional discipline, philology, it embodies several serious concerns. The setting is quasi-realistic, being the area around Oxford where Tolkien lived and worked. The story parodies multiple aspects of traditional dragon-slaying tales, and has roots in modern and medieval literature, from Norse myth to Spenser's The Faerie Queene. Its concern for the "Little Kingdom" embodies Tolkien's environmentalism, in particular his well-founded fears for the loss of the countryside of Oxfordshire and surrounding areas.

== Pseudo-translation from Latin ==
According to Tolkien's Foreword, Farmer Giles is not an original tale but a translation, from 'very insular Latin', of a compilation of old legends of the Little Kingdom. In token of this, the full subtitle is given as

Aegidii Ahenobarbi Julii Agricole de Hammo, Domini de Domito, Aule Draconarie Comitis, Regni Minimi Regis et Basilei mira facinora et mirabilis exortus, or in the vulgar tongue, The Rise and Wonderful Adventures of Farmer Giles, Lord of Tame, Count of Worminghall and King of the Little Kingdom

This presages the great number of Latin-based jokes throughout the story.

== Plot summary ==
Farmer Giles (Ægidius Ahenobarbus Julius Agricola de Hammo, "Giles Redbeard Julius, Farmer of Ham") is fat and red-bearded and enjoys a slow, comfortable life. A rather deaf and short-sighted giant blunders on to his land, and Giles manages to send him away with a blunderbuss shot. The people of the village cheer: Farmer Giles has become a hero. His reputation spreads across the kingdom, and he is rewarded by the King with an unfashionable old sword.

The giant, on returning home, relates to his friends that there are no more knights in the Middle Kingdom, just stinging flies—actually the scrap metal shot from the blunderbuss—and this entices a dragon from Venedotia, Chrysophylax Dives, to investigate the area. The terrified neighbours all expect the accidental hero Farmer Giles to deal with him.

The knights sent by the King to pursue the dragon turn out to be full of excuses not to do their duty. The villagers look to Giles to do something. The local priest finds that the old sword is Caudimordax ("Tailbiter"), meant specifically for killing dragons.

Giles sets out and meets Chrysophylax. The sword turns out to be able to fight almost on its own; Giles hits the dragon with the sword, damaging its wing so it cannot fly, and leads it through the town. It is made to promise to bring its treasure to the villagers, but it does not keep its word.

The king sends Giles and the knights to deal with Chrysophylax. The knights have never seen any dragon apart from their Christmas "Dragon Tail" cake made of marzipan. Chrysophylax kills them. Giles survives, and with his sword he masters the dragon and obtains part of the treasure. On his way home, he acquires the servants of the dead knights. Back at home, with servants and treasure, Giles becomes a powerful lord.

== Publication history ==
Farmer Giles of Ham was originally illustrated by Pauline Baynes. The story has appeared with other works by Tolkien in omnibus editions, including The Tolkien Reader and Tales from the Perilous Realm.

Tolkien dedicated Farmer Giles of Ham to Cyril Hackett Wilkinson (1888–1960), a don (lecturer) he knew at Oxford University; Wilkinson had encouraged Tolkien to go ahead with writing the story for the Lovelace Society at Worcester College.

== Analysis ==
=== Quasi-realistic geographical setting ===
Sketch map of real places in and around Oxfordshire in the English midlands, used for the "Little Kingdom" of Farmer Giles of Ham.

Tolkien, a philologist, sprinkled philological jokes into the tale, including intentionally false etymologies. The place-names are of places close to Ox[en]ford including Oakley, Otmoor and the Rollright Stones. At the end of the story, Giles is made Lord of Tame, and Count of Worminghall. The Tolkien scholar John Garth comments that the tale is "an elaborate false explanation for the name of the Buckinghamshire village of Worminghall".

John Garth's analysis of Tolkien's etymological "frolic" in Farmer Giles of Ham
Worminghall in the story	Worminghall, Buckinghamshire
"The hall of the Wormings", people descended from a man who tamed a worm (a dragon)	"Field of a man named Wyrma"

=== Quasi-realistic historical setting ===
The philologist and Tolkien scholar Tom Shippey suggests that the Middle Kingdom is based on early Mercia, since the Middle Kingdom's capital, "some twenty miles distant from Ham", could well be Tamworth, once Mercia's capital. Giles's break-away realm (the Little Kingdom) is based on Frithuwald's Surrey.

The tale's Foreword states that the tale is "a translation" from "insular Latin" of events taking place "after the days of King Coel maybe, but before Arthur or the Seven Kingdoms of the English".

=== Blunderbuss philology ===
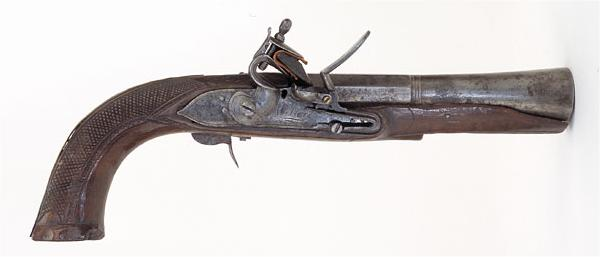
A blunderbuss

Another joke puts a question concerning the definition of blunderbuss to "the four wise clerks of Oxenford": "A short gun with a large bore firing many balls or slugs, and capable of doing execution [killing people] within a limited range without exact aim. (Now superseded, in civilised countries, by other firearms.)" Tolkien had worked on the Oxford English Dictionary, and the "four wise clerks" are "undoubtedly" the four Oxford English Dictionary lexicographers Henry Bradley, William Craigie, James Murray, and Charles Talbut Onions. Tolkien then satirises the dictionary definition by applying it to Farmer Giles's weapon:

However, Farmer Giles's blunderbuss had a wide mouth that opened like a horn, and it did not fire balls or slugs, but anything that he could spare to stuff in. And it did not do execution, because he seldom loaded it, and never let it off. The sight of it was usually enough for his purpose. And this country was not yet civilised, for the blunderbuss was not superseded: it was indeed the only kind of gun that there was, and rare at that.

The Tolkien scholar Tom Shippey comments: "Giles's blunderbuss ... defies the definition and works just the same."

=== Parody dragon-slaying tale ===
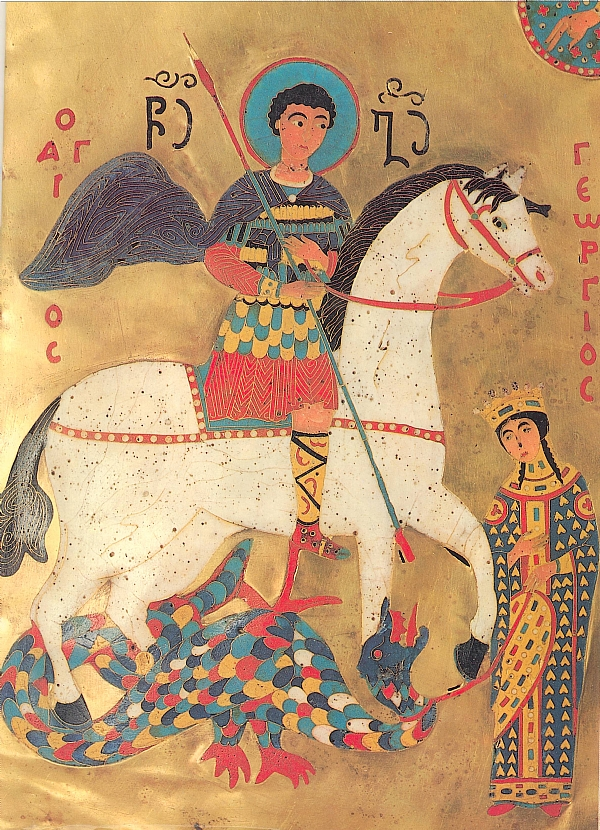
Chrysophylax was brought back to the city, tamed, as in the story of Saint George and the Dragon. 15th-century Georgian icon.

Romuald Lakowski describes Farmer Giles of Ham as a "delightful, and even in places brilliant, parody of the traditional dragon-slaying tale." The parody has many strands. The hero is a farmer, not a knight; the dragon is a coward, and is not killed, but tamed and forced to return his treasure. Lakowski derives Chrysophylax both from medieval dragons and from comic stories contemporary with Tolkien, like Edith Nesbit's The Dragon Tamers and Kenneth Grahame's The Reluctant Dragon. The story embodies a charter myth, in which Giles's descendants have a dragon on their crest because of his deeds. Further, it serves as a local legend, with mock etymologies of actual place-names.

Giles's cowardly talking dog Garm is named for the terrifying dog of the Norse underworld. Giles's magic named sword may derive partly from Norse myth, too; the god Freyr had a sword that could fight by itself. As for the fight with the dragon, the wounding of the monster's wing echoes an episode in Spenser's The Faerie Queene. Other allusions may include the legend of Saint George and the Dragon, as that dragon was brought back to the city, tamed, and led with the girdle of a maiden round its neck; and the Völsunga saga, as the dragon's cave sounds much like Fáfnir's.

=== Environmentalism ===
Alex Lewis, in Mallorn, writes that Tolkien lamented the loss of the countryside in and around Oxfordshire, which formed "the Little Kingdom" of the story. Tolkien loved nature, especially trees, and had what Lewis calls "well-founded" fears for the environment, "verg[ing] on the prophetic". Lewis analyses the factors that were causing this loss. They included the growth in Oxfordshire's population in the 20th century (doubling between 1920 and 1960); the area's industrialisation by Morris Motors, and the concomitant increase in motor traffic in the city of Oxford; the building of roads, including the M40 motorway cutting across the countryside; and the suburbanisation of Oxford as commuters started to use the railway to allow them to live in Oxford but work in London. The Second World War increased the number of airfields in the area from 5 to 96, causing the Oxfordshire countryside to be "gutted". Lewis states that Tolkien had hoped to write a sequel to Farmer Giles of Ham, but found that his legendarium had "bubbled up, infiltrated, and probably spoiled everything", and that it was "difficult [in 1949] to recapture the spirit of the former days, when we used to beat the bounds of the L[ittle] K[ingdom] in an ancient car." Tolkien was horrified by the change that motor traffic wreaked on Oxford, and the air pollution; he had given up his happy but dangerous driving, as depicted in his children's story Mr. Bliss, at the start of the war.

== Sources ==
- Carpenter, Humphrey, ed. (2023) [1981]. The Letters of J. R. R. Tolkien: Revised and Expanded Edition. New York: HarperCollins. ISBN 978-0-35-865298-4.
- Hammond, Wayne G.; Scull, Christina (2006a). The J.R.R. Tolkien Companion and Guide: Chronology. London: HarperCollins. ISBN 0-261-10381-4.
- Hammond, Wayne G.; Scull, Christina (2006b). The J.R.R. Tolkien Companion and Guide: Reader's Guide. London: HarperCollins. ISBN 0-007-14918-2.
- Shippey, Tom (2005) [1982]. The Road to Middle-Earth: How J. R. R. Tolkien Created a New Mythology (Third ed.). HarperCollins. ISBN 978-0-261-10275-0.
- Tolkien, J. R. R. (1949). Farmer Giles of Ham. George Allen and Unwin. ISBN 978-0-04-823068-3.
