= Leaf by Niggle =

Short story by J. R. R. Tolkien

- Short story by J. R. R. Tolkien
- English edition of Leaf by Niggle, HarperCollins, 2016
- Country: United Kingdom
- Genre: Fantasy short-story

Publication
- Published in: Dublin Review
- Publication date: January 1945

Chronology
The Hobbit	On Fairy-Stories

"Leaf by Niggle" is a short story written by J. R. R. Tolkien in 1938–39 (Note: Tolkien 1964, Introductory Note) and first published in the Dublin Review in January 1945. It was reprinted in Tolkien's book Tree and Leaf, and in several later collections. Contrary to Tolkien's claim that he despised allegory in any form, the story is an allegory of Tolkien's own creative process, and, to an extent, of his own life, following the structure of Dante's Purgatorio. It also expresses his philosophy of divine creation and human sub-creation. Tolkien said the story came to him in a dream.

== Context ==
J. R. R. Tolkien was a scholar of English literature, a philologist and medievalist interested in language and poetry from the Middle Ages, especially that of Anglo-Saxon England and Northern Europe. His professional knowledge of works such as Beowulf shaped his fictional world of Middle-earth, including his high fantasy novel The Lord of the Rings. (Note: Carpenter 2023, #131 to Milton Waldman, late 1951)

== Plot summary ==
In this story, an artist named Niggle lives in a society that does not value art. Working only to please himself, he paints a canvas of a great tree with a forest in the distance. He invests each and every leaf of his tree with obsessive attention to detail, making every leaf uniquely beautiful. Niggle ends up discarding all his other artworks, or tacks them onto the main canvas, which becomes a single vast embodiment of his vision.

However, mundane duties constantly prevent Niggle from giving his work the attention it deserves, so it remains incomplete and is not fully realised. At the back of his head, Niggle knows that he has a great trip looming, and he must prepare for it, but Niggle's next door neighbour, a gardener named Parish, frequently drops by asking for assistance. Parish is lame, has a sick wife, and genuinely needs help. Niggle, having a good heart, takes time out to help—but he is also reluctant because he would rather work on his painting. Niggle has other pressing work duties as well that require his attention. Then Niggle himself catches a chill doing errands for Parish in the rain.

Eventually, Niggle is forced to take his trip, and cannot get out of it. He has not prepared, and as a result the trip goes wrong, and he ends up in a kind of institution, in which he must perform menial labour each day. Back at the home to which he cannot return, Niggle's painting is abandoned, used to patch a damaged roof, and all but destroyed (except for the one perfect leaf of the story's title, which is placed in the local museum).

In time, Niggle is paroled from the institution, and he is sent to a place "for a little gentle treatment". He discovers that this new place is the country of the tree and forest of his great painting. This place is the true realisation of his vision, not the flawed and incomplete version in his painting.

Niggle is reunited with his old neighbour, Parish, who now proves his worth as a gardener, and together they make the tree and forest even more beautiful. Finally, Niggle journeys farther and deeper into the Forest, and beyond into the great mountains that he only faintly glimpsed in his painting.

Long after both Niggle and Parish have taken their journeys, the place that they created together becomes a destination for many travellers to visit before their final voyage into the mountains, and it earns the name "Niggle's Parish".

== Publication history ==
"Leaf by Niggle" was first published in the Dublin Review in 1945. (Note: Carpenter 2023, Letter 241 to Jane Neave, 8–9 September 1962) It first appeared in a book in 1964 alongside "On Fairy-Stories" in Tree and Leaf. It has been republished in the collections The Tolkien Reader (1966), Poems & Stories (1980), A Tolkien Miscellany (2002), and Tales from the Perilous Realm (2021).

== Analysis ==
=== Allegory ===
Tolkien made the general statement "I dislike allegory" in one of his letters, (Note: Carpenter 2023, Letter 131 to Milton Waldman, late 1951) but in specific references to "Leaf by Niggle", he wrote that "It is not really or properly an 'allegory' so much as 'mythical'", and "I tried to show allegorically how [sub-creation] might come to be taken up into Creation in some plane in my 'purgatorial' story Leaf by Niggle." (Note: Carpenter 2023, Letter 153 to Peter Hastings, draft, September 1954)

==== Of the journey of death ====
The Tolkien scholar and fellow-philologist Tom Shippey states categorically that the story is "quite certainly" an allegory, and that its first words recall "to any Anglo-Saxonist" the opening lines of the Old Northumbrian poem Bede's Death Song. Those lines, he states, equate death to a journey, hinting to the reader to continue making such "equations" of things in the world to elements of the story; and further, that the reader of the story is meant to interpret the story in this way, every tiny detail exactly and entertainingly fitting the pattern.

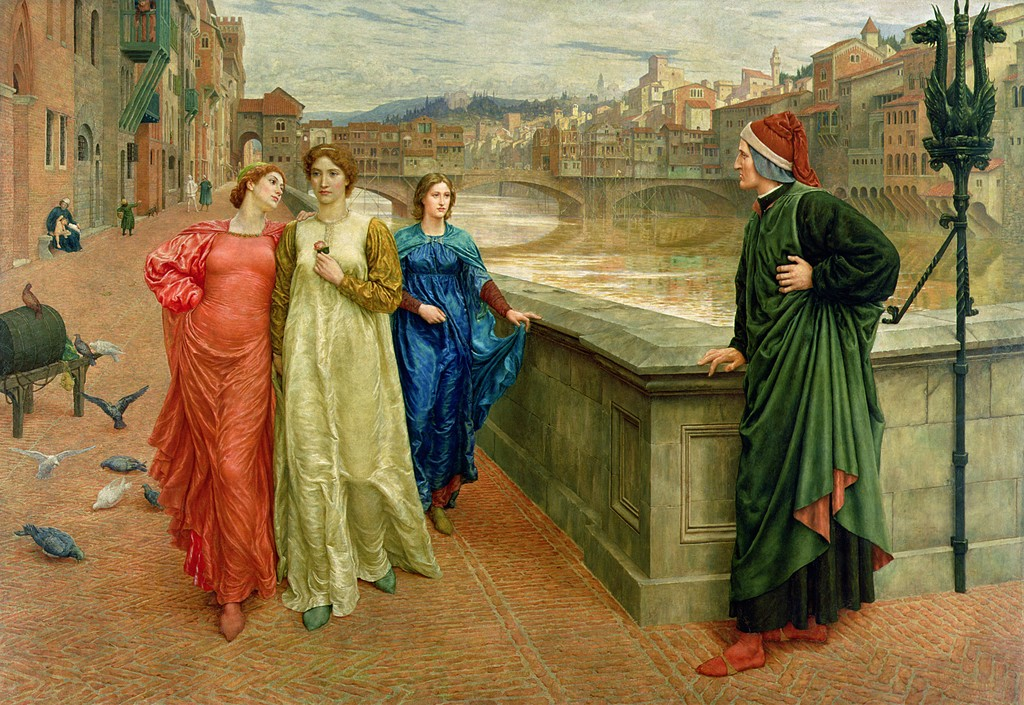
"Leaf by Niggle" matches the structure of Dante's Purgatorio, and fits Dante's romantic theology. Here, Dante looks longingly at Beatrice (centre) as she strolls by the River Arno. Dante and Beatrice, by Henry Holiday, 1883

A religious reading could lead to the conclusion that the allegory of "Leaf by Niggle" is life, death, purgatory and paradise. Niggle is not prepared for his unavoidable trip, as humans often are not prepared for death. His time in the institution and subsequent discovery of his Tree represent purgatory and heaven; Sebastian Knowles writes that the story "follows Dante's 'Purgatorio' in its general structure and in its smallest detail."

Michael Milburn argues that Charles Williams's view of Dante as romantic theology – which Milburn glosses as the serious theology of romantic experiences, including romantic love – can be applied to Tolkien's story. Dante, he writes, has a "glorious vision" of Beatrice that is "as real" as the actual Beatrice. She dies, leaving Dante with the inspiration to "be love", to stay faithful to his vision of her. This can be applied to art with "a source text that not only takes art for its subject but locates the vision of great art in the afterlife with Beatrice, includes an experience analogous to the death of Beatrice, and explores the relationship between artistic beauty and caritas. Milburn states that Tolkien's "Leaf by Niggle" is just such a text, because Niggle's allegorical "journey" signifies death, the "Workhouse" signifies purgatory, and the place Niggle reaches after that is the Earthly Paradise, the place for Tolkien as for Dante of final purification before heaven, Niggle's "mountains". Tolkien had met Williams, as they were both members of the Inklings literary group. Further, Milburn notes, Tolkien, despite denying that Williams had been an influence, wrote a poem about him, in which he praises William's understanding of Dante, his romantic theology: "But heavenly footsteps, too, can Williams trace, / and after Dante, plunging, soaring, race / up to the threshold of Eternal Grace".

==== Of Tolkien's life ====
An autobiographical interpretation places Tolkien himself as Niggle—in mundane matters as well as spiritual ones. Tolkien was compulsive in his writing, his endless revisions, his desire for perfection in form and in the "reality" of his invented world, its languages, its chronologies, its existence. Like Niggle, Tolkien came to abandon other projects or graft them onto his "Tree", Middle-earth. Like Niggle, Tolkien faced many chores and duties that kept him from the work he loved; and like Niggle, Tolkien was a confirmed procrastinator. Shippey comments that whereas Tolkien had once felt that one could return to Faërie in some way, later in his life he came to doubt that he would "[rejoin] his own creations after death, like Niggle; he felt they were lost, like the Silmarils." He adds that when Tolkien presents images of himself in his writings, as with Niggle and Smith, there is "a persistent streak of alienation". Shippey lists several elements of the allegory in "Leaf by Niggle".

Tom Shippey's analysis of "Leaf by Niggle" as an allegory of Tolkien's life
Story element	Aspect of Tolkien's life
Niggle the painter	Tolkien the writer
Niggle's "leaf"	The Hobbit, published 1937
Niggle's "Tree"	The Lord of the Rings, still in work when "Leaf by Niggle" was written
The "country" that opens from it	Middle-earth
The "other pictures ... tacked on to the edges of his great picture"	Tolkien's poems and other works which he fitted into his novel
"Potatoes" sacrificed to "paint"	Medievalist research articles sacrificed to The Lord of the Rings

==== Of creation and sub-creation ====
"Leaf by Niggle" can be interpreted, too, as an illustration of Tolkien's religious philosophy of creation and sub-creation. In this philosophy, true creation is the exclusive province of God, and those who aspire to creation can only make echoes (good) or mockeries (evil) of truth. The sub-creation of works that echo the true creations of God is one way that mortals honour God. This philosophy is evident in Tolkien's other works, especially The Silmarillion—one Vala, Morgoth, creates the Orc race as a foul mockery of the Elves. Another Vala, Aulë, creates the Dwarf race as an act of subcreation that honoured Eru Ilúvatar (the analogue of God in Tolkien's writings), and which Eru accepted and made real, just as Niggle's Tree was made real. Niggle's yearnings after truth and beauty (God's creations) are echoed in his great painting. After death, Niggle is rewarded with the realisation (the making-real) of his yearning; or, alternatively, Niggle's Tree always existed and he simply echoed it in his art. From a metanarrative viewpoint, Tolkien's Arda is itself a subcreation designed to honour the true stories of the real world. Thus, The Lord of the Rings, despite its lack of overt religious elements, can be interpreted as a profoundly religious work.

=== Surrealistic dream memory ===
Michael Organ, writing in the Journal of Tolkien Research, notes that Tolkien stated in a letter that the story came to him one morning in 1939, shortly before the start of the Second World War, when he woke up with the story, which he called "that odd thing", in his mind "virtually" complete. (Note: Carpenter 2023, Letter 98 to Stanley Unwin, c. 18 March 1945) Tolkien stated in another letter that he then wrote it out "almost in a sitting and very nearly in the form in which it now appears", commenting that looking back at the story, he thought it "arose" from a combination of his love of trees and his concern that The Lord of the Rings would never be finished. (Note: Carpenter 2023, Letter 199 to Caroline Everett, 24 June 1957) Organ describes the birth of "Leaf by Niggle" as "a frenzy of activity" resembling the automatic writing "popularised by proponents of Dada and Surrealism" in the early 20th century. He notes, too, that Tolkien knew that dreams had an irrational side, and had commented that it was "exceptional" for fantasy to appear in dreams, as "Fantasy is a rational, not an irrational, activity". Organ comments that Tolkien may have resisted "what he saw as the morbidity of surrealism" in connection with his story, precisely because "Leaf by Niggle"'s message is so positive.

=== Visual imagery ===
Jeffrey MacLeod and Anna Smol write in Mythlore that while Tolkien defines sub-creation "in linguistic terms", he often links such verbal creation to visual images. For instance, in his poem "Mythopoeia", he mentions "script and limning packed of various hue", which they gloss as "writing and drawing, alphabet and image, the linguistic and the visual ... side by side." Similarly, they comment, in "Leaf by Niggle", the allegory uses the image of a painter. In his own life, Tolkien combined the writing of fiction with his artwork, while he defined imagination visually as the "mental power of image-making".

== Sources ==
- Carpenter, Humphrey (1977). J. R. R. Tolkien: A Biography. New York: Ballantine Books. ISBN 978-0-04-928037-3.
- Carpenter, Humphrey, ed. (2023) [1981]. The Letters of J. R. R. Tolkien: Revised and Expanded Edition. New York: HarperCollins. ISBN 978-0-35-865298-4.
- Shippey, Tom (2001). J. R. R. Tolkien: Author of the Century. HarperCollins. ISBN 978-0261-10401-3.
- Shippey, Tom (2005) [1982]. The Road to Middle-Earth: How J. R. R. Tolkien Created a New Mythology (Third ed.). HarperCollins. ISBN 978-0-261-10275-0.
- Tolkien, J. R. R. (1964). J. R. R. Tolkien: Tree and Leaf. London: HarperCollins.
