= African-American Vernacular English =

Variety of American English

- Black Vernacular English
- Region: United States
- Ethnicity: African Americans
- Language family: Indo-European: Germanic; West Germanic; North Sea Germanic; Anglo-Frisian; Anglic; English; American English; Older Southern American English; African-American Vernacular English
- Early forms: Proto-Indo-European: Proto-Germanic; Old English; Middle English; Early Modern English
- Writing system: Latin (English alphabet); American Braille

Language codes
- ISO 639-3: –
- Glottolog: afri1276
- Linguasphere: 52-ABA-ci

African-American Vernacular English (Note: Also known as Black English, Black Vernacular English, Black English Vernacular, or African-American English.) (AAVE), (Note: AAVE is pronounced as an initialism ("A-A-V-E"), /ˈɑːveɪ/, or /æv/.) sometimes controversially known as Ebonics, is the variety of English natively spoken by most working-class and middle-class Black Americans. This variety is also spoken among some Black Canadians. Having its own unique grammatical, vocabulary, and accent features, AAVE is employed by middle-class Black Americans as the more informal and casual end of a sociolinguistic continuum. However, in formal speaking contexts, speakers tend to switch to more standard American English grammar and vocabulary, usually while retaining elements of the vernacular (non-standard) accent. AAVE is widespread throughout the United States, but it is not the native dialect of all Black Americans, and a small number of its speakers are not Black Americans.

Like most varieties of African-American English, African-American Vernacular English shares a large portion of its grammar and phonology with the regional dialects of the Southern United States, and especially older Southern American English, due to the historical enslavement of African Americans primarily in that region.

Mainstream linguists see only minor parallels between AAVE, West African languages, and English-based creole languages, instead most directly tracing back AAVE to diverse non-standard dialects of English as spoken by the English-speaking settlers in the Southern Colonies and later the Southern United States. However, a minority of linguists argue that the vernacular shares so many characteristics with African creole languages spoken around the world that it could have originated as a creole (or semi-creole) language, distinct from the English language, before re-converging with English. (Note: Linguists in favor of the "creole hypothesis" of African-American Vernacular English include creolists William Stewart, John Dillard, and John Rickford.)

== Origins ==
African-American Vernacular English (AAVE) may be considered a dialect, ethnolect, and sociolect. While it is clear that there is a strong historical relationship between AAVE and earlier Southern U.S. dialects, the origins of AAVE are still a matter of debate.

The prevailing theory among linguists is that AAVE has always been a dialect of English, meaning that it originated from earlier English dialects rather than from English-based creole languages that "decreolized" back into English. In the early 2000s, Shana Poplack provided corpus-based evidence from isolated enclaves in Samaná and Nova Scotia populated by descendants of migrations of early AAVE-speaking groups that suggests that the grammar of early AAVE was closer to that of contemporary British dialects than modern urban AAVE is to other current American dialects, suggesting that the modern language is a result of divergence from mainstream varieties, rather than the result of decreolization from a widespread American creole.

Linguist John McWhorter maintains that the contribution of West African languages to AAVE is minimal. McWhorter has characterized AAVE as a "hybrid of regional dialects of Great Britain that slaves in America were exposed to because they often worked alongside the indentured servants who spoke those dialects..." According to McWhorter, virtually all linguists who have carefully studied the origins of AAVE "agree that the West African connection is quite minor."

However, a creole theory, less accepted among linguists, posits that AAVE arose from one or more creole languages used by African captives of the Atlantic slave trade, due to the captives speaking many different native languages and therefore needing a new way to communicate among themselves and with their captors. According to this theory, these captives first developed pidgins or simplified mixtures of languages. Because pidgins form from close contact between speakers of different languages, the slave trade would have been exactly such a situation. Creolist John Dillard quotes, for example, slave ship captain William Smith describing the sheer diversity of mutually unintelligible languages just in The Gambia.

By 1715, an African pidgin was reproduced in novels by Daniel Defoe, in particular, The Life of Colonel Jacque. In 1721, Cotton Mather conducted the first attempt at recording the speech of slaves in his interviews regarding the practice of smallpox inoculation. By the time of the American Revolution, varieties among slave creoles were not quite mutually intelligible. Dillard quotes a recollection of "slave language" toward the latter part of the 18th century: "Kay, massa, you just leave me, me sit here, great fish jump up into da canoe, here he be, massa, fine fish, massa; me den very grad; den me sit very still, until another great fish jump into de canoe; but me fall asleep, massa, and no wake 'til you come...." Not until the time of the American Civil War did the language of the slaves become familiar to a large number of educated Whites. The abolitionist papers before the war form a rich corpus of examples of plantation creole. In Army Life in a Black Regiment (1870), Thomas Wentworth Higginson detailed many features of his African-American soldiers' language. Opponents of the creole theory suggest that such pidgins or creoles existed but simply died out without directly contributing to modern AAVE.

== Phonology ==
Speech example
An example of a man from northern Ohio with an AAVE accent (Bobby Womack).

Speech example
An example of a man from New York City with an AAVE accent (Eric Adams).

Speech example
An example of two men with AAVE accents, the interviewer from Georgia (D. J. Shockley) and the interviewee from Louisiana (Russell Gage).

Many pronunciation features set AAVE apart from other forms of American English (particularly General American). John McWhorter argues that what truly unites all AAVE accents is a uniquely wide-ranging intonation pattern or "melody", which characterizes even the most "neutral" or light African-American accent. A handful of multisyllabic words in AAVE differ from General American in their stress placement so that, for example, police, guitar, and Detroit are pronounced with initial stress instead of ultimate stress. The following are phonological differences in AAVE vowel and consonant sounds.

Final consonant groups or clusters in AAVE have been examined as evidence of the systematic nature of this language variety, governed by specific rules. These analyses have been utilized to bolster arguments concerning the historical origins of AAVE. Consonant cluster reduction is a phonological process where a final consonant group or cluster, consisting of two adjacent consonant sounds, is simplified or reduced to a single consonant sound. The analysis of consonant cluster reduction in AAVE assumes that, initially, final clusters are present and intact in the language. For example, the word "tes" in AAVE originates from "test", with the final "t" of the "st" consonant cluster being deleted in word-final position.

=== Vowels ===
All AAVE vowels
Pure vowels (monophthongs)
English diaphoneme	AAVE phoneme	Example words
/æ/	[æ~ɛː~ɛə]	act, pal, trap
/æ/	[ɛː~ɛə~eə] (/æ/ raising)	ham, land, yeah
/ɑː/	[a~ɑ̈~ɑ]	blah, bother, father, lot, top, wasp
/ɒ/	[a~ɑ̈~ɑ]	blah, bother, father, lot, top, wasp
/ɒ/	[ɒ(ɔ)~ɔ(ʊ)]	all, dog, bought, loss, saw, taught
/ɔː/	[ɒ(ɔ)~ɔ(ʊ)]	all, dog, bought, loss, saw, taught
/ɛ/	[ɛ~eə]	dress, met, bread
/ə/	[ə]	about, syrup, arena
/ɪ/	[ɪ~iə]	hit, skim, tip
/iː/	[i]	beam, chic, fleet
/ʌ/	[ʌ~ɜ]	bus, flood, what
/ʊ/	[ʊ~ɵ~ø̞]	book, put, should
/uː/	[ʊu~u]	food, glue, new
Diphthongs
/aɪ/	[äe~äː~aː]	prize, slide, tie
/aɪ/	[äɪ] (Canadian raising)	price, slice, tyke
/aʊ/	[æɔ~æə]	now, ouch, scout
/eɪ/	[eɪ~ɛɪ]	lake, paid, rein
/ɔɪ/	[oɪ]	boy, choice, moist
/oʊ/	[ʌʊ~ɔʊ]	goat, oh, show
R-colored vowels
/ɑːr/	non-rhotic: [ɑ~ɒ] rhotic: [ɑɹ~ɒɹ]	barn, car, heart
/ɛər/	non-rhotic: [ɛə] rhotic: [ɛɹ]	bare, bear, there
/ɜːr/	[ɚ]	burn, first, herd
/ər/	non-rhotic: [ə] rhotic: [ɚ]	better, martyr, doctor
/ɪər/	non-rhotic: [iə~iɤ] rhotic: [iɹ]	fear, peer, tier
/ɔːr/	non-rhotic: [oə~ɔə~ɔo] rhotic: [oɹ]	hoarse, horse, poor score, tour, war
/ʊər/	non-rhotic: [oə~ɔə~ɔo] rhotic: [oɹ]	hoarse, horse, poor score, tour, war
/jʊər/	non-rhotic: [juə~jʊə] rhotic: [juɹ~jʊɹ]	cure, Europe, pure

- Cot–caught merger: AAVE accents have traditionally resisted the cot–caught merger spreading nationwide, with lot pronounced [ɑ̈] and thought traditionally pronounced [ɒɔ], though now often [ɒ] or [ɔə], with the latter pronunciation most prominent in the Northeastern U.S. However, there is evidence of AAVE speakers exhibiting the cot–caught merger in Pittsburgh, Pennsylvania; Charleston, South Carolina; Florida and Georgia; and in parts of California.
  - African American Vowel Shift: Early 2000s research has shown that the resistance to the cot–caught merger may continue to be reinforced by the fronting of lot, linked through a chain shift of vowels to the raising of the trap, dress, and perhaps kit vowels. This chain shift of vowels is called the "African American Shift". However, this shift is not universal to all AAVE speakers; it is mostly exhibited by speakers who live in all the states along the Mississippi River and in North Carolina.
- Reduction of certain diphthong forms to monophthongs, in particular, the price vowel /aɪ/ is monophthongized to [aː] except before voiceless consonants (this is also found in most White Southern dialects). The vowel sound in choice (/ɔɪ/ in General American) is also monophthongized, especially before /l/, making boil indistinguishable from ball.
- Pin–pen merger: Before nasal consonants (/m/, /n/, and /ŋ/), dress /ɛ/ and kit /ɪ/ are both pronounced like [ɪ~ɪə], making pen and pin homophones. This is also present in other dialects, particularly of the South. The pin–pen merger is not universal in AAVE, and there is evidence for unmerged speakers in California, New York, New Jersey, and Pennsylvania.
- The distinction between the kit /ɪ/ and fleece /i/ vowels before liquid consonants is frequently reduced or absent, making feel and fill homophones (fill–feel merger). /ʊər/ and /ɔːr/ also merge, making poor and pour homophones (cure–force merger).

=== Consonants ===
- Word-final devoicing of /b/, /d/, and /ɡ/, whereby, for example, cub sounds similar to cup, though these words may retain the longer vowel pronunciations that typically precede voiced consonants, and devoicing may be realized with debuccalization (where /d/ is realized as [.], for instance).
- AAVE speakers may not use the fricatives [θ] (the th in "thin") and [ð] (the th of "then") that are present in other varieties of English. The phoneme's position in a word determines its exact sound.
  - Word-initially, /θ/ is normally the same as in other English dialects (so thin is [θɪn]); in other situations, it may move forward in the mouth to /f/ (Th-fronting).
  - Word-initially, /ð/ is [ð~d] (so this may be [dɪs]). In other situations, /ð/ may move forward to /v/.
- Realization of final ng /ŋ/, the velar nasal, as the alveolar nasal [n] (assibilation, alveolarization) in function morphemes and content morphemes with two or more syllables like -ing, e.g. tripping /ˈtrɪpɪŋ/ is pronounced as [ˈtɹɪpɨn] (trippin) instead of the standard [ˈtɹɪpɪŋ]. This change does not occur in one-syllable content morphemes such as sing, which is [sɪŋ] and not *[sɪn]. However, singing is [ˈsɪŋɨn]. Other examples include wedding → [ˈwɛɾɨn], morning → [ˈmo(ɹ)nɨn], nothing → [ˈnʌfɨn]. Realization of /ŋ/ as [n] in these contexts is commonly found in many other English dialects.
- A marked feature of AAVE is final consonant cluster reduction. This is a process by which the pronunciations of consonant clusters at the end of certain words are reduced to pronouncing only the first consonant of that cluster. There are several phenomena that are similar but governed by different grammatical rules. This tendency has been used by creolists to compare AAVE to West African languages since such languages do not have final clusters.
  - Final consonant clusters that are homorganic (have the same place of articulation) and share the same voicing are reduced. For instance, test is pronounced [tɛs] since /t/ and /s/ are both voiceless; hand is pronounced [hæn] (alternatively [hæ̃] or [hɛən]), since /n/ and /d/ are both voiced; but pant is unchanged, as it contains both a voiced and a voiceless consonant in the cluster. It is the plosive (/t/ and /d/) in these examples that is lost rather than the fricative; the nasal is also either preserved completely or lost with preservation of nasality on the preceding consonant. Speakers may carry this declustered pronunciation when pluralizing so that the plural of test is [ˈtɛsɨs] rather than [tɛsts]. The clusters /ft/, /md/ are also affected.
  - More often, word-final /sp/, /st/, and /sk/ are reduced, again with the final element being deleted rather than the former.
  - For younger speakers, /skr/ also occurs in words where other varieties of English would have /str/ instead. As a result, for example, street is pronounced [skɹit].
  - Clusters ending in /s/ or /z/ exhibit variation in whether the first or second element is deleted.
- Similarly, final consonants may be deleted, although there is a great deal of variation between speakers in this regard. Most often, /t/ and /d/ are deleted. As with other dialects of English, final /t/ and /k/ may reduce to a glottal stop. Nasal consonants may be lost while nasalization of the vowel is retained (e.g., find may be pronounced [fãː]). More rarely, /s/ and /z/ may also be deleted.
- Use of metathesized forms like aks for "ask" or graps for "grasp".
- General non-rhotic behavior, in which the rhotic consonant /r/ is typically dropped when not followed by a vowel; it may also manifest as an unstressed [ə] or the lengthening of the preceding vowel. Intervocalic /r/ may also be dropped, e.g., General American story ([ˈstɔɹi]) can be pronounced [ˈstɔ.i], though this doesn't occur across morpheme boundaries. /r/ may also be deleted between a consonant and a back rounded vowel, especially in words like throw, throat, and through.
  - The level of AAVE rhoticity is likely somewhat correlated with the rhoticity of White speakers in a given region; in 1960s research, AAVE accents tended to be mostly non-rhotic in Detroit, whose White speakers are rhotic, but completely non-rhotic in New York City, whose White speakers are also often non-rhotic.
- /l/ is often vocalized in patterns similar to that of /r/ (though never between vowels) and, in combination with cluster simplification (see above), can make homophones of toll and toe, fault and fought, and tool and too. Homonymy may be reduced by vowel lengthening and by an off-glide [ɤ].

=== "Deep" phonology ===
McWhorter discusses an accent continuum from "a 'deep' Black English through a 'light' Black English to standard English," saying the sounds on this continuum may vary from one African American speaker to the next or even in a single speaker from one situational context to the next. McWhorter regards the following features as rarer and characteristic of only deep African-American Vernacular English, though speakers of light African-American Vernacular English may occasionally "dip into for humorous or emotive effect":

- Lowering of /ɪ/ before /ŋ/, causing pronunciations such as [θɛŋ~θæŋ] for thing (sounding something like thang).
- Word-medially and word-finally, pronouncing /θ/ as [f] (so [mʌmf] for month and [mæɔf] for mouth), and /ð/ as [v] (so [smuv] for smooth and [ˈɹævə(ɹ)] for rather. This is called th-fronting. Word-initially, /ð/ is [d] (so those and doze sound nearly identical). This is called th-stopping. In other words, the tongue fully touches the top teeth.
- Glide deletion (monophthongization) of all instances of /aɪ/, universally, resulting in [aː~äː] (so that, for example, even rice may sound like rahss).
- Full gliding (diphthongization) of /ɪ/, resulting in [iə] (so that win may sound like wee-un).
- Raising and fronting of the vowel /ʌ/ of words like strut, mud, tough, etc. to something like [ɜ~ə].

== Grammar ==
=== Tense and aspect ===
Although AAVE does not necessarily have the simple past-tense marker of other English varieties (that is, the -ed of "worked"), it does have an optional tense system with at least four aspects of the past tense and two aspects of the future tense. The dialect uses several tense–aspect–mood markers integrated into the predicate phrase, including gon or gonna (future tense), done (completive aspect), be (habitual aspect, state of being), and been (durative aspect). These can function separately or in conjunction.

Linguist Charles E. DeBose notes that these markers form part of a broader and systematic tense, modality, and aspect (TMA) grammar in AAVE, in which native speakers distinguish between nuanced temporal categories—such as remote versus recent past—through constructions like BIN (e.g., "He BIN left") to indicate a long-completed action that remains relevant.

Phases/tenses of AAVE
Phase		Example
Past	Pre-recent	I been bought it
Past	Recent	I done bought it ^{a}
Past	Pre-present	I did buy it
Past	Past inceptive	I do buy it
Present		I be buying it
Future	Immediate	I'ma buy it ^{b}
Future	Post-immediate	I'ma gonna buy it ^{b}
Future	Indefinite future	I gonna buy it

^aSyntactically, I bought it is grammatical, but done (always unstressed, pronounced as /dən/) is used to emphasize the completed nature of the action.

^bI'ma, also commonly spelled Imma, is pronounced as /ˈaɪmə/. Harvard professor Sunn m'Cheaux claims I'ma originated in the Gullah language (an English creole), which uses "a-" instead of "-ing" for this type of verb inflection. Alternatively, other sources suggest it is a further shortening of I'm gonna.

As phase auxiliary verbs, been and done must occur as the first auxiliary; when they occur as the second, they carry additional aspects:

He been done working means "he finished work a long time ago".
He done been working means "until recently, he worked over a long period of time".

The latter example shows one of the most distinctive features of AAVE: the use of be to indicate that performance of the verb is of a habitual nature. In most other American English dialects, this can only be expressed unambiguously by using adverbs such as usually.

This aspect-marking form of been or BIN is stressed and semantically distinct from the unstressed form: She BIN running ('She has been running for a long time') and She been running ('She has been running'). This aspect has been given several names, including perfect phase, remote past, and remote phase (this article uses the third). As shown above, been places action in the distant past. However, when been is used with stative verbs or gerund forms, been shows that the action began in the distant past and that it is continuing now. Rickford (1999) suggests that a better translation when used with stative verbs is "for a long time". For instance, in response to "I like your new dress", one might hear Oh, I been had this dress, meaning that the speaker has had the dress for a long time and that it isn't new.

To see the difference between the simple past and the gerund when used with been, consider the following expressions:

I been bought her clothes means "I bought her clothes a long time ago".
I been buying her clothes means "I've been buying her clothes for a long time".

Auxiliaries in African American Vernacular English are related in a typical pattern. They can be grouped into negative forms and affirmative forms for each of the words. For example, "had" is an affirmative form, while "hatn" is the corresponding negative form. These same auxiliaries can be used to mark sentences for the anterior aspect. As another example, was marks type 1 sentences, which by default are present tense, and transforms them to a time before the present. Take, for instance, "She at home": the word was can be inserted to mark this sentence, making the marked equivalent "She was at home". Auxiliaries such as these also have opposing negative and affirmative forms. In its negative form the auxiliary verb "wadn" is used to convey the opposing affirmative form.

AAVE grammatical aspects
Aspect	Example	Standard English meaning
Habitual/continuative aspect	He be working Tuesdays.	He frequently (or habitually) works on Tuesdays.
Intensified continuative (habitual)	He stay working.	He is always working.
Intensified continuative (not habitual)	He steady working.	He keeps on working.
Perfect progressive	He been working.	He has been working.
Irrealis (Mood)	He finna go to work.	He is about to go to work.^{a}

- ^a Finna corresponds to "fixing to" in other varieties. It is also written fixina, fixna, fitna, and finta.

In addition to these, come (which may or may not be an auxiliary) may be used to indicate speaker indignation, such as in Don't come acting like you don't know what happened and you started the whole thing ("Don't try to act as if you don't know what happened, because you started the whole thing").

The irrealis mood marker be, having no intrinsic tense refers to a current or future event that may be less than real.

Modals

The dialect uses double modals, such as might could, which can function in various ways, including as adverbs.

=== Negation ===
Negatives are formed differently from most other varieties of English:

- Use of ain't as a general negative marker. As in other English dialects, it can be used instead of am not, isn't, aren't, haven't, and hasn't. However, some speakers of AAVE distinctively use ain't instead of don't, doesn't, or didn't (e.g., I ain't know that). Ain't had its origins in common English but became increasingly stigmatized since the 19th century.
- Double negation, as in I didn't go nowhere. If the sentence is negative, all negatable forms are negated. This contrasts with standard written English convention, which interprets a double negative to mean a positive (although this was not always so; see double negative). There is no limit to how many negators can be used.
- In a negative construction, an indefinite pronoun such as nobody or nothing can be inverted with the negative verb particle for emphasis (e.g., Don't nobody know the answer, Ain't nothing going on.)

While AAVE shares these with Creole languages, early recordings of African Nova Scotian English, Samaná English, and recordings of former slaves indicate that negation was likely inherited from nonstandard colonial English.

=== Other grammatical characteristics ===
- The copula be in the present tense is often dropped, as in Russian, Hungarian, Arabic, and other languages. For example: You crazy ("You're crazy") or She my sister ("She's my sister"). This extends to questions: Who you? ("Who're you?") and Where you at? ("Where are you (at)?"). This has been sometimes considered a Southern U.S. regionalism, though it is most frequent in African-American speech. On the other hand, is can be included for emphasis: Yes, she is my sister. The general rules are:
  - Only the forms is and are (often replaced by is) can be omitted; am, was, and were are not deleted.
  - These forms cannot be omitted when they would be pronounced with stress in Standard American (whether or not the stress serves specifically to impart an emphatic sense to the verb's meaning).
  - These forms can be omitted only when the corresponding form in standard English can be contracted. For example, I don't know where he is cannot be reduced to *I don't know where he, and correspondingly Standard English forbids the contraction *I don't know where he's. Compare the acceptable forms I don't know where he at in AAVE, paralleling I don't know where he's at in Standard English.
- Verbs are uninflected for number and person: there is no -s ending in the present-tense third-person singular. Example: She write poetry ("She writes poetry"). AAVE don't for standard English doesn't comes from this, unlike in some other dialects which use don't for standard English doesn't but does when not in the negative. Similarly, AAVE was is used for standard English was and were.
- The genitive -'s ending indicating possession may or may not be used. Instead, genitive case is inferable from adjacency. This feature is similar to many Caribbean creoles. Many language forms throughout the world use an unmarked possessive; it may here result from a simplification of grammatical structures. Example: my momma sister ("my mother's sister").
- The words it and they denote existence of something, equivalent to standard English's there is or there are.
- Word order in questions: Why they ain't growing? ("Why aren't they growing?") and Who the hell she think she is? ("Who the hell does she think she is?") lack the inversion of most other forms of English. Because of this, there is also no need for the auxiliary do.
- Relative clauses do not require a relative pronoun when they modify a noun in the object or in the predicate nominative position.

== Vocabulary ==
AAVE shares most of its lexicon with other varieties of English, particularly that of informal and Southern dialects, such as, the relatively recent use of y'all. The main sources for new words are combining, shifting, shortening, blending, borrowing, and creating. It has also been suggested that some of the vocabulary unique to AAVE has its origin in West African languages. However, etymology is often difficult to trace and, without a trail of recorded usage, these proposed origins cannot be considered proven.

Early AAVE and Gullah contributed a number of words of African origin to the American English mainstream, including gumbo, goober, yam, and banjo.

Compounding in AAVE is a very common method in creating new vocabulary. The most common type of compounding is the noun–noun combination, followed by adjective–noun combination. AAVE also combines adjectives with other adjectives less frequently, but more often than in standard American English.

AAVE has also contributed slang expressions such as cool and hip, to dig, jazz, tote, and bad-mouth, a calque from Mandinka. In many cases, the proposed West African etymologies are not recognized by linguists or the Oxford English Dictionary. Innovative African American slang is often formed by combining, shifting, shortening, blending, and borrowing English words and phrases that are regarded as informal.

AAVE also has words that either are not found in other American English dialects or that have strikingly different meanings. For example, there are several words in AAVE referring to White people that are not part of mainstream American English; these include gray as an adjective for Whites (as in gray dude), possibly from the color of Confederate uniforms; and paddy, an extension of the slang use for "Irish". "Red bone" is another example of this, usually referring to light-skinned African Americans.

"Ofay", which is pejorative, is another general term for a White person; it might derive from the Ibibio word afia, which means "light-colored", from the Yoruba word ofe, spoken in hopes of disappearing from danger. However, most dictionaries simply say its etymology is unknown.

Kitchen refers to the particularly curly or kinky hair at the nape of the neck, and siditty or seddity means "snobbish" or "bourgeois".

AAVE has also contributed many words and phrases to other varieties of English, including chill out, main squeeze, soul, funky, and threads.

== Influence on other dialects ==
African-American Vernacular English has influenced the development of other dialects of English. The AAVE accent, New York accent, and Spanish-language accents have together yielded the sound of New York Latino English, some of whose speakers use an accent indistinguishable from an AAVE one. AAVE has also influenced certain Chicano accents and Liberian Settler English, directly derived from the AAVE of the original 16,000 African Americans who migrated to Liberia in the 1800s. In the United States, urban youth participating in hip-hop culture or marginalized as ethnic minorities may also adopt AAVE, or prominent elements of it: for example, Southeast-Asian Americans embracing hip-hop identities.

Internet slang has borrowed heavily from AAVE, which has often been characterized as cultural appropriation. The term blaccent broadly refers to the accent associated with AAVE, but more often refers to the use of AAVE by non-African American speakers.

== Variation ==
=== Urban versus rural variations ===
Early research on African-American Vernacular English took place in cities such as New York, Los Angeles, and Chicago. These studies concluded that AAVE was linguistically homogenous, or spoken roughly the same way everywhere around the country. Later sociolinguists found that these cities lacked the influence of the rural South and that earlier studies had not considered the representation of the Southern United States.

While AAVE began as mostly rural and Southern, today it is mostly urban and nationally widespread. Its more recent urban features are now diffusing back into rural areas. Urban AAVE alone is intensifying with the grammatical features exemplified in these sentences: "He be the best" (intensified equative be), "She be done had her baby" (resultative be done), and "They come hollerin" (indignant come). On the other hand, rural AAVE alone shows certain features too, such as: "I was a-huntin" (a-prefixing); "It riz above us" (different irregular forms); and "I want for to eat it" (for to complement). Use of the word bees in place of be to mean is or are in standard English, as in the sentence "That's the way it bees", is one of the rarest of all deep AAVE features today. Most middle-class AAVE speakers would recognize the verb bees as part of only a deep "Southern" or "country" speaker's vocabulary.

=== Local variations ===
Some researches have identified at least 10 distinct regional accents in AAVE. Regional variation in AAVE does not pattern with other regional variation in North American English, which broadly follows East-to-West migration patterns, but instead patterns with the population movements during the Great Migration, resulting in a broadly South-to-North pattern, albeit with founder effects in cities that already had existing African American populations at the beginning of the Great Migration.

New York City / Urban NE AAVE (Lingua: 52-ABA-cid) incorporates some local features of the New York accent, including its high thought vowel; meanwhile, conversely, Pittsburgh AAVE may merge this same vowel with the lot vowel, matching the cot–caught merger of White Pittsburgh accents, though AAVE accents traditionally do not have the cot–caught merger. Urban Southern AAVE in Memphis, Atlanta, and Research Triangle (Lingua: 52-ABA-cib) incorporates the dress vowel raising and face vowel lowering associated with White Southern accents. Memphis and St. Louis AAVE are developing, since the mid-twentieth century, an iconic merger of the vowels in square and nurse, making there sound like thurr. Western AAVE (Lingua: 52-ABA-cif) spoken in California often lacks a cot–caught merger, especially before nasals. Regional patterns of pronunciation and word choice are also apparent on social media. Varieties of AAVE also exist in Canada, including urban AAVE (Lingua: 52-ABA-cig) spoken in Ontario, and rural AAVE (Lingua: 52-ABA-cih) spoken in Amber Valley.

There is general uniformity of AAVE grammar, despite its vast geographic spread across the whole country. This may be due in part to relatively recent migrations of some African Americans out of the American South (see Great Migration and Second Great Migration) as well as to long-term racial segregation that kept these speakers living together in largely homogeneous communities.

== Social perception and context ==
African-American Vernacular suffers from persistent stigma and negative social evaluation in American culture. By definition, as a vernacular dialect of English, AAVE has not received the social prestige of a standard dialect, leading to widespread and long-standing misconceptions that it is a grammatically inferior form of English, which linguistics research of the twentieth century has debunked. However, educators and social commentators traditionally have advocated for eliminating AAVE usage through the public education system for a variety of reasons, ranging from a continued belief that AAVE is intrinsically deficient to arguments that its use, by being stigmatized in certain social contexts, is socially limiting. Some of the harshest criticism of AAVE or its use has come from African Americans themselves. A conspicuous example was the "Pound Cake speech", in which Bill Cosby criticized fellow African Americans for various social behaviors, including the way they talked.

Educators traditionally have attempted to eliminate AAVE usage through the public education system, perceiving the dialect as grammatically defective. In 1974, the teacher-led Conference on College Composition and Communication issued a position statement affirming students' rights to their own dialects and the validity of all dialects. Mainstream linguistics has long agreed with this view about dialects. In 1979, a judge ordered the Ann Arbor School District to find a way to identify AAVE speakers in the schools and to "use that knowledge in teaching such students how to read standard English." In 1996, Oakland Unified School District made a controversial resolution for AAVE, which was later called "Ebonics". The Oakland School board approved that Ebonics be recognized as a language independent from English (though this particular view is not endorsed by linguists), that teachers would participate in recognizing this language, and that it would be used in theory to support the transition from Ebonics to Standard American English in schools. This program lasted three years and then died off.

=== In music and artistic culture ===
Many notable genres, styles, and movements within African-American music, and cultural and artistic movements or subcultures, are offshoots of African-American culture. The genres of Christian spirituals, blues, jazz, R&B, and hip-hop all originated from Black Americans. AAVE, thus, is the typical dialect employed in their lyrics, often even among these genres' non-Black musicians. Two such cultural movements with particular international prominence are jazz culture of the late 1930s and 1940s (with its associated AAVE slang, jive talk) and hip-hop culture of the late 20th century into the present.

== See also ==
- Africanisms
- African American English
- Glossary of jive talk
- Gullah language
- Is-leveling
- Languages of the United States
- North American English regional phonology
- Northern Subject Rule
- Brittonicisms in English
- Covert prestige
