= Tolkien, Race and Cultural History =

Book of literary criticism by Dimitra Fimi

- Kaleidoscopic cover image of Moseley Bog, made by the author
- Author: Dimitra Fimi
- Language: English
- Genre: Literary criticism, Tolkien research
- Publisher: Palgrave Macmillan
- Publication date: 2008
- Publication place: United Kingdom
- Awards: Mythopoeic Scholarship Award 2010
- ISBN: 978-0-230-21951-9
- OCLC: 222251097

Tolkien, Race, and Cultural History: From Fairies to Hobbits is a 2008 book by Dimitra Fimi about J. R. R. Tolkien's Middle-earth writings. Scholars largely welcomed the book, praising its accessibility and its skilful application of a biographical-historical method which sets the development of Tolkien's legendarium in the context of Tolkien's life and times. Major themes of the book include Tolkien's constructed languages, and the issues of race and racism surrounding his work.

The book won the Mythopoeic Scholarship Award for Inklings Studies in 2010.

== Context ==
J. R. R. Tolkien (1892–1973) was an English Roman Catholic writer, poet, philologist, and academic, best known as the author of the high fantasy works The Hobbit and The Lord of the Rings. Tolkien's Middle-earth fantasy writings have been accused of embodying outmoded attitudes to race. Against this, Tolkien strongly opposed Nazi racial theories, as in a 1938 letter to his publisher, while in the Second World War he vigorously opposed anti-German propaganda. His Middle-earth has been described as definitely polycultural and polylingual.

Dimitra Fimi is a Greek scholar and author. She is a lecturer in fantasy and children's literature at the University of Glasgow.

== Book ==
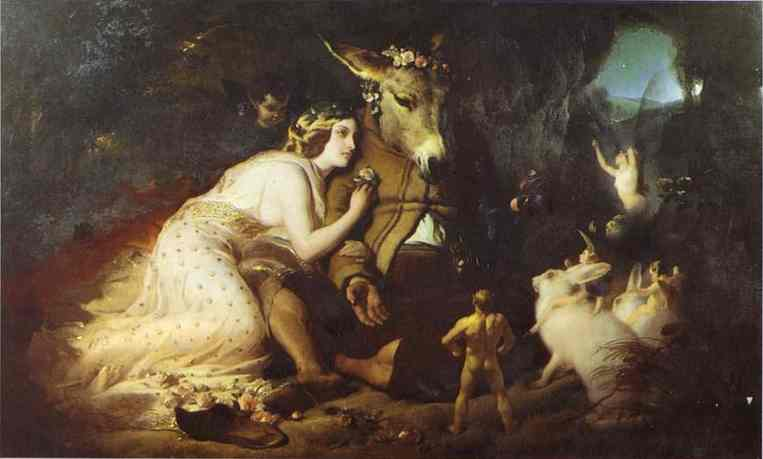
Edwin Landseer's 1848 Scene from A Midsummer Night's Dream, illustrated in the book, complete with the sort of diminutive fairies that Tolkien at first accepted, then came to dislike.

Part I examines the origins of Tolkien's legendarium, relating it to the diminutive elves and fairies in Victorian children's books, and to English and European folklore.

Part II explores the roots of Tolkien's thought in linguistics, and his linguistic aesthetic, involving the creation of constructed languages.

Part III analyses Tolkien's desire to create a world with its own history. Middle-earth's flat-world and round-world cosmologies are discussed. The question of race is examined, along with racial mixture, the appearance of evil in the Orcs, and the charge of racism. The material culture of Middle-earth is explored, with aspects such as ship burials, winged helmets, Anglo-Saxon culture, and the far more modern Victorian era rural culture of the Shire.

The text ends with an epilogue discussing Tolkien's transition from fairies to the far more down-to-earth hobbits. There are academic notes, a bibliography, and an index.

The book is illustrated with 13 monochrome images in the text, including historic depictions of fairies and elves, some of Tolkien's own drawings and paintings, and a photograph of Sarehole Mill by the author.

The book appeared in hardback in 2008, and was reprinted in paperback in 2010.

=== Awards ===
Tolkien, Race, and Cultural History won the Mythopoeic Scholarship Award for Inklings Studies in 2010.

== Reception ==
=== Literary development in its historical context ===
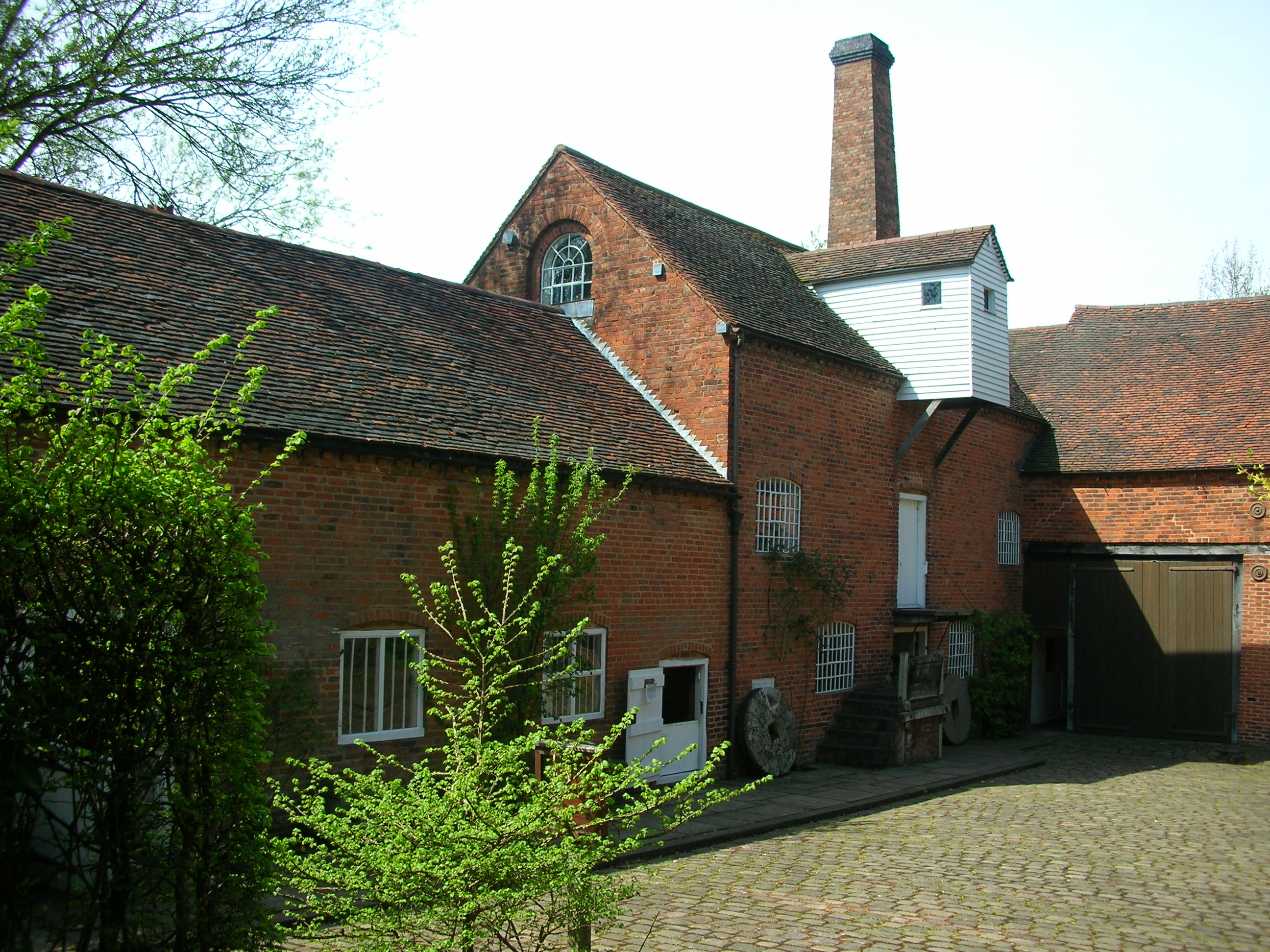
Sarehole Mill, used by Tolkien for the rustic Old Mill in the Shire, is ironically an early Industrial Revolution building.

Mark Hooker, writing in the Mythopoeic Society's journal Mythprint, suggests that the book should have been titled Tolkien in His Historical Context, as the discussion is by no means limited to the issues of race and fairies mentioned on the book's cover, and Fimi states explicitly that her method consists of setting the author in his historical period. He finds the book admirably "well-written and accessible".

Philip Irving Mitchell, in Christianity & Literature, similarly notes Fimi's historical contextualising. He finds it "terribly ironic" that Tolkien should have chosen Sarehole Mill, an early Industrial Revolution building, as the idealised symbol, the Old Mill in the Shire's central village, Hobbiton, for a lost idyll of rural England.

Thomas Honegger, in Tolkien Studies, notes that Fimi uses a "biographical-historical" method, relating events in Tolkien's life and period to the development of his legendarium. He finds the text clear and informative, but in some places "not really new", as Tolkien's then unpublished writings and poetry were inaccessible; that made the biographical-historical method impossible to apply in full detail.

Lori Campbell, writing in Modern Fiction Studies, adds that Tolkien's own "endless documentation of how he viewed his own work and its meaning" in his essays and letters supports Fimi's approach comparing fiction and biography. Campbell finds that the materials are skilfully used, as Fimi "deftly intertwines" Tolkien's words with the threads of history. She notes how Fimi explores Tolkien's "admiration" for Elias Lönnrot's Kalevala, a compilation of Finland's national mythology, and the matching desire in England for something similar.

=== Race and racism in context ===
Campbell finds Part III "perhaps the most intriguing" section of the book, as myth turns to history and men take centre stage, displacing elves. She notes that Fimi "helpfully exonerates" Tolkien from racism, offering arguments on historical and Middle-earth grounds, but that Fimi does not state that "dark" need not mean skin colour in Tolkien's writings; instead, Campbell writes, Tolkien's light and dark are "signifiers of goodness or its absence", relating to the light of the Silmarils and the Two Trees of Valinor. Mordor is black in lacking "things that are of the light, that is, belief, joy, imagination, and perhaps most importantly, diversity." In sum, she finds the book "both sophisticated and accessible", adding strength to Tolkien research.

Mitchell writes that despite some traces of its doctoral thesis ancestry, the book is "rich in background and has the grace to avoid too much theoretical jargon." He notes that Part III occupies nearly half the book, and that its subject matter is well-developed. In his view, Fimi provides a "nuanced and quite balanced" analysis of race in the context of Tolkien's shifting attitudes, from his schoolboy views to his position on Nazi racism and words like "Aryan", "Nordic", and "peoples". In Mitchell's view, Fimi handles Tolkien's treatment of the human race, including "the Three Houses of Men, the "Swarthy Easterlings", the Númenórean and Gondorian view of blood, and the 'noble savages' that are the Wild Men of the Wood[s]" particularly well.

=== Constructing languages ===
Henry Gee, in the Tolkien Society's journal Mallorn, remarks that Fimi's statement that "the period 1880–1914 witnessed 145 [language construction] projects" sets Tolkien's creation of elvish languages and his knowledge of Esperanto in a fresh context. For Gee, Fimi brings out "a kind of creative logic" which almost necessitated a legendarium. This consisted of a welcoming attitude (among his friends) to folklore and fairies; a romantic desire for a national mythology; and a love of language and language construction. Gee finds the book exceptionally readable for an academic text. He admires, too, Fimi's kaleidoscope image of Moseley Bog (a nature reserve near Tolkien's childhood home in Warwickshire), which he finds entirely appropriate for the book's cover. Hooker adds that Fimi's analysis of the British and European tradition of inventing languages makes Tolkien's "secret vice" more understandable.

== Sources ==
- Carpenter, Humphrey (1978) [1977]. J. R. R. Tolkien: A Biography. Unwin Paperbacks. ISBN 978-0-04928-039-7.
- Carpenter, Humphrey, ed. (2023) [1981]. The Letters of J. R. R. Tolkien: Revised and Expanded Edition. New York: HarperCollins. ISBN 978-0-35-865298-4.
- Fimi, Dimitra (2010) [2008]. Tolkien, Race, and Cultural History: From Fairies to Hobbits. Palgrave Macmillan. ISBN 978-0-230-21951-9. OCLC 222251097.
- Straubhaar, Sandra Ballif (2004). "Myth, Late Roman History, and Multiculturalism in Tolkien's Middle-Earth". In Chance, Jane (ed.). Tolkien and the invention of myth: a reader. University Press of Kentucky. ISBN 978-0-8131-2301-1.
