= Secret vice =

Secret vice may refer to:

- Masturbation
- A Secret Vice, a lecture given by J. R. R. Tolkien regarding constructed languages
