= The Story of Kullervo =

Book by J.R.R. Tolkien

- Front cover of the 2015 hardback edition; detail from painting "The Land of Pohja" by Tolkien.
- Editor: Verlyn Flieger
- Author: J.R.R. Tolkien; Verlyn Flieger
- Cover artist: J.R.R. Tolkien
- Language: English
- Subject: Finnish mythology Literary analysis Academia
- Published: 27 August 2015 (U.K.)
- Publisher: HarperCollins (U.K.); Houghton Mifflin Harcourt (U.S.)
- Publication place: United Kingdom
- ISBN: 978-0-00-813136-4
- Preceded by: Beowulf: A Translation and Commentary
- Followed by: A Secret Vice

The Story of Kullervo is a collection of several texts, including a prose version of the Kullervo cycle in Elias Lönnrot's Karelian and Finnish epic poem Kalevala, written by J. R. R. Tolkien when he was an undergraduate at Exeter College, Oxford, from 1914 to 1915. That was an unsettled period for the author and this is thought to be reflected in the story's dark subject matter.

It also marks "the first time that J. R. R. Tolkien, who had been a poet until then, began writing prose". Known as a source (among others) for Túrin Turambar, "The Story of Kullervo" was the centre of Tolkien's efforts in 1914, as he was "trying to turn one of the stories [of the Kalevala] — which is really a very great story and most tragic – into a short story" (Letters, October 1914, #1). As well as Tolkien's treatment of the Kullervo cycle, the book also contains three essays: two by Tolkien from the same period and the third by Flieger – the two essays by Tolkien are (as is the story) accompanied by notes and commentary by the editor.

The first of Tolkien's essays (On The Kalevala or Land of Heroes) was written in 1914 and was delivered as a talk to the Corpus Christi College 'Sundial' club at Oxford in November 1914 and again at the Exeter College Essay Club in February 1915; his second essay (The Kalevala), a revised version of the first, is unfinished and is unknown to have ever been delivered. Verlyn Flieger suggests a date of circa 1919 for the revised essay; she notes but disagrees with Christina Scull & Wayne G. Hammond's estimate of 1921–24.

== Book structure ==
The main parts of the book are:

- The Story of Kullervo
  - Notes and commentary
- On 'The Kalevala' or Land of Heroes
  - Notes and commentary
- The Kalevala
  - Notes and commentary
- Tolkien, The Kalevala, and 'The Story of Kullervo' by Verlyn Flieger

== History of publication ==
The Story of Kullervo was edited by Verlyn Flieger, published in 2010 in Tolkien Studies, and republished in book form in August 2015 by HarperCollins. In 2013, Eduardo Oliveira Ferreira submitted an academic project titled The Story of Kullervo to The Tolkien Estate, with contributions by Verlyn Flieger, John Garth, Wayne G. Hammond, Christina Scull, and Shaun Gunner. The bilingual English–Portuguese volume was approved by The Tolkien Estate under the condition that it be limited to 100 copies and that the final text be subject to the Estate’s review. However, once The Story of Kullervo was confirmed for publication by HarperCollins, Oliveira Ferreira’s project was cancelled.

== Reception ==
Elizabeth Graham in a review for NPR wrote that "this folk tale is not a nice one. Newcomers to Tolkien may find it a somewhat rough ride, but Tolkien geeks will find plenty to geek out about."

Those expecting a typical Tolkien story will be unsettled by Kullervo: He is physically ugly, angry, destructive and uncontrollable. Raised as a prisoner of his father's murderer, Kullervo survives all attempts to kill him and ruins every task he is given. Sold into slavery and mistreated by his master's wife, Kullervo arranges for her to be eaten alive by wolves and bears. On his way home, he meets a girl and abducts her; they live together for a time, but she drowns herself when they discover they are brother and sister.

Kirkus Reviews called the book "Hobbitmeister Tolkien’s first effort at fantasy, surrounded by scholarly scaffolding." and noted that "serious students of his work and of world folklore will appreciate this more than will general readers."
