= Tolkien and race =

Attitudes to race in J. R. R. Tolkien's writings

J. R. R. Tolkien's Middle-earth fantasy writings have been said to embody outmoded attitudes to race. He was exposed as a child to Victorian attitudes to race, and to a literary tradition of monsters. In his personal life, he was anti-racist both in peacetime and during the two World Wars.

With the late 19th-century background of eugenics and a fear of moral decline, Robin Anne Reid and others have suggested that the presentation of the Orcs in The Lord of the Rings embodies scientific racism. David Ibata has stated that Peter Jackson's depiction of the Orcs in his The Lord of the Rings film trilogy was modelled on racist wartime propaganda caricatures of the Japanese. Tolkien said that his Dwarves were reminiscent of the Jews, raising questions of possible antisemitism. John Magoun has said that the work embodies what he calls a moral geography, namely that the West of Middle-earth is good and the East is evil.

In his personal life, Tolkien strongly opposed Nazi racial theories, as seen in a 1938 letter he wrote to his publisher. In the Second World War he vigorously opposed anti-German propaganda. Sandra Ballif Straubhaar has described Middle-earth as definitely polycultural and polylingual. Scholars including Patrick Curry and Christine Chism have noted that assertions that Tolkien was a racist based on The Lord of the Rings often omit relevant evidence from the text.

== Scholarly approaches ==
Scholars and commentators have said that Tolkien held outmoded views on race, as seen in the Middle-earth stories, based on his depictions of the relationship between evil and race (the main races being Elf, Dwarf, Hobbit, Man, and Orc). Robert Stuart says that Tolkien was a "racialist" since he writes of races with different attributes, and then proceeds to analyse Tolkien's use of black and white (including his antipathy to racism and apartheid from his mother's experience in South Africa), the nature of Orcs, the racial connections in his language, antisemitism, and the apparent hierarchy of races and lords within them. Stuart concludes that "Tolkien's legendarium is suffused with racialist imagery and, at times, imbued with racist values".

The folklorist and Tolkien scholar Dimitra Fimi examines Tolkien's use of and attitudes to race in her 2009 book Tolkien, Race and Cultural History. She notes that scholars including Anderson Rearick, David Perry, and Patrick Curry have criticised or defended Tolkien on "racial charges". In response, she says that Tolkien wrote mostly "when race was still a valid scientific term", while scholars still held "ideas of the nature of Man and his place in the world". In her view, it is therefore "very problematic to pursue such questions [of racism] in Tolkien's work, since they could only be treated within the framework of modern perspectives on racism and racial discrimination".

== Discussions of racism in Middle-earth ==
Tolkien's descriptions of certain characters and races have been criticised as racist by writers including Andrew O'Hehir and Jenny Turner—especially his descriptions of Orcs and their purported similarity to 20th century stereotypes of Asians. In a private letter, Tolkien describes orcs as: (Note: Carpenter 2023, #210 to Forrest J. Ackerman, June 1958)

squat, broad, flat-nosed, sallow-skinned, with wide mouths and slant eyes: in fact degraded and repulsive versions of the (to Europeans) least lovely Mongol-types.

Writing for Salon, the journalist Andrew O'Hehir says of Tolkien's orcs: "They are dark-skinned and slant-eyed, and although they possess reason, speech, social organization and, as Shippey mentions, a sort of moral sensibility, they are inherently evil." O'Hehir concludes that while Tolkien's own description of Orcs is a revealing representation of the "Other", it is "also the product of his background and era" and that Tolkien was not consciously "a racist or an anti-Semite"; he mentions Tolkien's letters to this effect. The literary critic Jenny Turner, writing in the London Review of Books, repeats O'Hehir's statement that Orcs are "by design and intention a northern European's paranoid caricature of the races he has dimly heard about", but adds similar caveats, saying: "Tolkien does not appear to have been half as crackers on these topics [of race and race purity] as many others were. He sublimated the anxieties, perhaps, in his books."

Patrick Curry, Christine Chism and others say that race-focused critiques of Tolkien and his Middle-earth writings often omit relevant textual evidence, cite imagery from adaptations such as Peter Jackson's films rather than the work itself, ignore the absence of evidence of racist attitudes or events in the author's personal life, and claim that seeing racism in his writing is itself a marginal view.

Walter Scheps writes that Tolkien's accountability "does not extend beyond" his creation: "we cannot expect it to conform to important human values". Scheps adds that since Tolkien is the only source of data on Orcs and other races, "we need no longer be bothered by the fact that Tolkien's evil creatures are black (orcs), speak ungrammatical, lower class English (trolls)", and so on. Scheps specifically denies that Middle-earth is amoral – he quotes Patricia Meyer Spacks as saying "amorality is not really possible in Tolkien's scheme" – but states that the work's morality "is nevertheless radically different from our own".

=== Moral decline through racial mixing ===
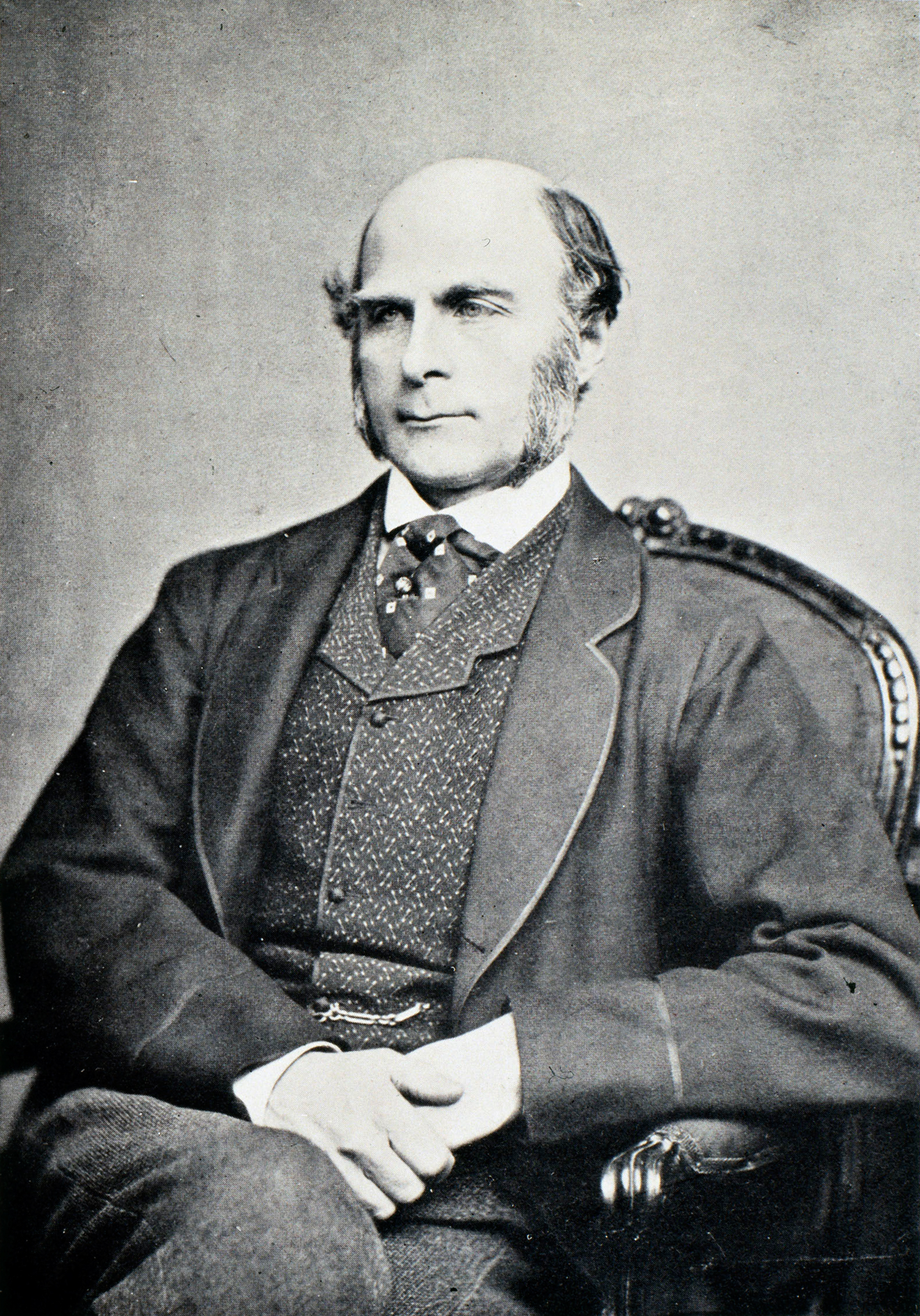
Scholars have likened the dislike for racial mixing in the creation of Orcs to Francis Galton's views on eugenics.

The scholars of English literature William N. Rogers II and Michael R. Underwood note that a widespread element of late 19th century Western culture was fear of moral decline and degeneration; this led to eugenics. In The Two Towers, the Ent Treebeard says: (Note: Tolkien 1954, book 3, ch. 4, "Treebeard")

It is a mark of evil things that came in the Great Darkness that they cannot abide the Sun; but Saruman's Orcs can endure it, even if they hate it. I wonder what he has done? Are they Men he has ruined, or has he blended the races of Orcs and Men? That would be a black evil!

The literature scholar Robin Anne Reid, writing in the Journal of Tolkien Research, says that modern studies of the many influences on Tolkien's orcs include a focus on the scientific racism of the 19th century and the 20th-century challenges to that concept. Similarly, the Australian scholar Helen Young, who studies the links between white supremacism and medievalism, describes Tolkien as a bridge between the scientific racism of the 19th century and racism in modern fantasy.

The philosopher Charles W. Mills comments that in his Middle-earth writings, Tolkien effectively reprises the racist myth of 19th-century European thinking by men such as the British advocate of eugenics, Francis Galton. Mills notes that there was a fear that intermixing of what were then called races would lead to "internal diminution and degeneration" of the supposedly superior white Europeans. Stuart concurs, examining Tolkien's alternative proposals for the origins of Orcs, whether "Animals, Automatons, or Twisted Elves", and finding signs of a racist attitude there.

=== Polycultural Middle-earth ===
The Germanic studies scholar Sandra Ballif Straubhaar says there is sometimes evidence in Tolkien's writing of "a kind of racism perhaps not unremarkable in a mid-twentieth century Western man", but that this is often overstated and must be balanced against the "polycultured, polylingual world" that is "absolutely central" to Middle-earth as well as Tolkien's own "appalled objection" to those seeking to use his work to uphold racist ideas in the real world. She writes that Tolkien made a "concerted effort" to change the Western European paradigm that speakers of supposedly superior languages were "ethnically superior".

Responding to David Tjeder's suggestion that Gollum's negative description of a dark-skinned men from Harad was "stereotypical and reflective of colonial attitudes", Straubhaar compares Gollum's description—with its "arbitrary and stereotypical assumptions about the 'Other'"—with Sam Gamgee's more humane response to the sight of a dead Harad warrior:

"Not nice; very cruel wicked Men they look. Almost as bad as Orcs, and much bigger."

— Gollum on the Men of Harad (Note: Tolkien 1954. The Two Towers, book 4, ch. 3 "The Black Gate is Closed")

He was glad that he could not see the dead face. He wondered what the man's name was and where he came from; and if he was really evil of heart, or what lies or threats had led him on the long march from his home.

— Sam Gamgee, on the dead Harad warrior (Note: Tolkien 1954. The Two Towers, book 4, ch. 4 "Of Herbs and Stewed Rabbit")

Gollum's perspective is absurd, Straubhaar says, and cannot be taken as an authority on Tolkien's opinion; Straubhaar finds Gamgee's response "harder to find fault with". Fimi says that, in the same scene, Tolkien is "far from demonising the enemy or dehumanising the 'other'".

=== Dwarves and antisemitism ===
Tolkien scholars have debated the relationship of Dwarves to Jews. Tolkien stated that he thought of his Dwarves as reminiscent of "the Jews", (Note: Carpenter 2023, #176 to Naomi Mitchison, 8 December 1955) and that the Dwarves' words were "constructed to be Semitic". Zak Cramer documents in Mallorn the evidence for Jewish influence in Tolkien's Middle-earth writings. He comments that words like "Adûnaic" and "Rohirrim", and the structure of the Dwarvish language Khuzdul, are all evidently "Hebraic". Some commentators draw parallels between the Dwarves as a diasporic people yearning for an ancestral homeland and Zionism.

Tolkien's portrayal of Dwarves raises the question, examined by Rebecca Brackmann in Mythlore, of whether there was an element of antisemitism, however deeply buried, in Tolkien's account of the Dwarves, inherited from English attitudes of his time. Brackmann notes that Tolkien attempted to work through the issue in his Middle-earth writings. Stuart notes Tolkien's phrase about the Jews, "that gifted people", and discusses the evidence for and against his having antisemitic views.

=== Orcs and evil ===
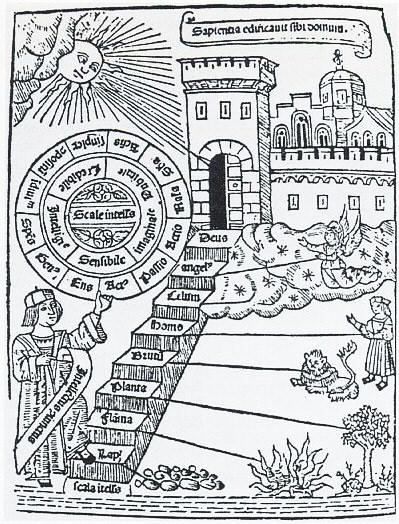
Dimitra Fimi writes that Middle-earth assumes a fixed hierarchy of types of being, like the medieval great chain of being. (Ramon Llull's Ladder of Ascent and Descent of the Mind, 1305, pictured)

Anderson Rearick III writes that in Middle-earth, darkness and black are linked with evil Orcs and the Dark Lord Sauron, and that the Orcs are essentially expendable, a view with which Tom Shippey concurs. Rearick lists multiple arguments that imply that Tolkien was not racist, citing Steuard Jensen's observation that there are "light skinned characters who did evil things", (Note: Rearick was citing Jensen, Steuard (1999). "Meta-FAQ: 7. Was Tolkien racist? Were his works?". Archived from the original on 30 June 2012.) including Boromir, Denethor, Gollum, Saruman, and Gríma Wormtongue. He notes that the link between darkness and evil is made many times in the Bible, with phrases such as "the shadow of death" or "you are all children of light". The irredeemable Orcs, he notes, are traceable to Old English vocabularies where Latin Orcus (Pluto, ruler of the underworld, or death) is glossed as "orc, giant, or the devil of Hell". Rearick ends by stating that racism is a philosophy of power, whereas The Lord of the Rings embodies the Christian renunciation of power; he explains that Frodo gives up everything to fulfil his quest, just as Christ did. In his view, "nothing could be more contrary to the assumptions of racism than a Hobbit as a hero".

Fimi, author of an academic study of Tolkien and race, notes the years of heated popular and scholarly debate on whether Tolkien was racist, and concludes that the answer is both yes and no. She writes that Middle-earth is hierarchical like the medieval great chain of being, with God at the top, above (in turn) Elves, Men, and at the bottom monsters such as Orcs. In her view, this makes sense in terms of theology, and indeed in a mythology like The Silmarillion, whereas a novel like The Lord of the Rings demanded rounded characters rather than symbols of good or evil.

Fimi writes that Tolkien "agonised" over the origins of Orcs. Summarizing his explanations, she states that if they were corrupted Elves or Men, that would fit the view that Morgoth could corrupt but not create; that Elves and Men had free will, and if they did evil, could perhaps be redeemed. She writes that the earlier author George MacDonald had created a race of evil goblins, something that she finds an equally uncomfortable "product of 19th-century anxieties about race and evolutionary degeneration". She comments, however, that a novel is written within a tradition; Tolkien's orcs fit into the tradition of MacDonald's goblins and ultimately of the monsters in Beowulf. She concludes, "I believe Tolkien's racial prejudices are implicit in Middle-Earth, but his values – friendship, fellowship, altruism, courage, among many others – are explicit, which makes for a complex, more interesting world", and that complexities of this kind get people of each generation to read The Lord of the Rings, and to interpret it afresh.

=== Orcs as a demonised enemy ===
In a private letter, Tolkien describes orcs as:

squat, broad, flat-nosed, sallow-skinned, with wide mouths and slant eyes: in fact degraded and repulsive versions of the (to Europeans) least lovely Mongol-types.

Fimi describes Tolkien's mentions of "swarthy complexions" and slanted eyes as "straight out of Victorian anthropology, which links mental qualities and physique".

A variety of commentators have noted that orcs are somewhat like caricatures of non-Europeans. The editor and critic Andrew O'Hehir describes orcs as "a subhuman race bred by Morgoth and Sauron (although not created by them) that is morally irredeemable and deserves only death. They are dark-skinned and slant-eyed, and although they possess reason, speech, social organisation and, as Shippey mentions, a sort of moral sensibility, they are inherently evil." O'Hehir notes Tolkien's description of them, saying it could scarcely be more revealing as a representation of the "Other". He adds that this is "the product of his background and era, like most of our inescapable prejudices. At the level of conscious intention, he was not a racist or an anti-Semite", and mentions his letters to this effect. In a letter to his son, Christopher, who was serving in the Royal Air Force in the Second World War, Tolkien wrote of orcs as appearing on both sides of the conflict: (Note: Carpenter 2023, #71 to Christopher Tolkien, 25 May 1944)

Yes, I think the orcs as real a creation as anything in 'realistic' fiction ... only in real life they are on both sides, of course. For 'romance' has grown out of 'allegory', and its wars are still derived from the 'inner war' of allegory in which good is on one side and various modes of badness on the other. In real (exterior) life men are on both sides: which means a motley alliance of orcs, beasts, demons, plain naturally honest men, and angels.

The literary critic Jenny Turner, writing in the London Review of Books, endorses O'Hehir's comment that orcs are "by design and intention a northern European's paranoid caricature of the races he has dimly heard about". The journalist Ed Power, in The Daily Telegraph, compares Orcs to the stormtroopers in Star Wars, as both are "a metaphorical embodiment" of evil. According to Power, Tolkien's mythology for England required characters to be either good or evil.

=== Moral geography: West versus East ===
Imagemap with clickable links of Tolkien's moral geography of Middle-earth, according to John Magoun

John Magoun, writing in The J. R. R. Tolkien Encyclopedia, says that Middle-earth has a "fully expressed moral geography". The peoples of Middle-earth vary from the hobbits of the Shire in the Northwest, evil "Easterlings" in the East, and "imperial sophistication and decadence" in the South. Magoun explains that Gondor is both virtuous, being West, and has problems, being South; Mordor in the Southeast is hellish, while Harad in the extreme South "regresses into hot savagery". The medievalist and Tolkien scholar Marjorie Burns too has noted Tolkien's "superiority of North over South, West over East".

Tolkien denied a North–South bias in a 1967 letter to his interviewers Charlotte and Denis Plimmer: (Note: Carpenter 2023, #294 to Charlotte and Denis Plimmer, 8 February 1967)

Auden has asserted that for me 'the North is a sacred direction'. That is not true. The North-west of Europe, where I (and most of my ancestors) have lived, has my affection, as a man's home should. I love its atmosphere, and know more of its histories and languages than I do of other parts; but it is not 'sacred', nor does it exhaust my affections. I do have, for instance, a particular fondness for the Latin language, and among its descendants for Spanish. That is untrue for my story, a mere reading of the synopses should show. The North was the seat of the fortresses of the Devil [ie. Morgoth].

Tolkien agreed that there was a West vs East moral divide, but stated that it developed naturally over the course of the fictional history and denied that it applied to the modern world:

The goodness of the West and the badness of the East has no modern reference. The concept came about through the necessities of narrative. (Note: Scull & Hammond 2006, p. 640)

== Opposition to racism ==
Scholars such as Fimi note that Tolkien was in some ways clearly anti-racist, as he actively opposed "racialist" theories, spoke out against Nazism, called Adolf Hitler a "ruddy little ignoramus", (Note: Carpenter 2023, #45 to Michael Tolkien, 9 June 1941) and opposed anti-German propaganda in wartime. (Note: Carpenter 2023, #81 to Christopher Tolkien, 23–25 September 1944) As already mentioned, scholars including Curry and Chism state that textual evidence indicates Tolkien's non-racism.

=== Opposition to Nazi racial theory ===
Fimi writes that Tolkien refused to declare that he had an "Aryan" origin so as to be published in Nazi Germany. In 1938, the publishers of the German translation of The Hobbit, Rütten & Loening of Potsdam, wrote to Tolkien asking if he was of pure arisch ("Aryan") descent. He asked his English publisher, Stanley Unwin if he should (Note: Carpenter 2023, #29 to Stanley Unwin, #30 to Rütten & Loening, both 25 July 1938)

suffer this impertinence because of the possession of a German name, or do their lunatic laws require a certificate of 'arisch' origin from all persons of all countries?

He drafted two letters to Rütten & Loening; only one survives, and his biographer Humphrey Carpenter presumes that Unwin sent the other to Rütten & Loening. The surviving draft says

I regret that I am not clear as to what you intend by arisch. I am not of Aryan extraction: that is Indo-Iranian [...] But if I am to understand that you are enquiring whether I am of Jewish origin, I can only reply that I regret that I appear to have no ancestors of that gifted people.

In Newsweek, David Brennan commented that the draft "demonstrates the author's opinion on the Nazi state—and its misunderstanding of the word 'Aryan'—in no uncertain terms." Ed Jefferson, in The New Statesman, agreed, writing that the letter made it plain "that he was appalled by the Nazis". (Note: A German edition of The Hobbit, translated by Walter Scherf, was published by Georg Bitter Verlag, Recklinghausen, in 1957.)

In a 1941 letter to his son Michael, Tolkien condemned Adolf Hitler for:

ruining, perverting, misapplying, and making forever accursed, that noble northern spirit, a supreme contribution to Europe, which I have ever loved, and tried to preserve in its true light.

Deakin University lecturer Helen Young commented, "The comment shows that he believed that some people were essentially different to and better than others. This notion is foundational to racism."

In manuscript notes dated possibly to 1942 for "The Beginnings of English Poetry" (an adaptation of his 1938 radio talk for the BBC's Poetry Will Out series) —Tolkien rejected "false simplification" of racial and cultural history alongside Nazi ideology, comparing "nonsense talked in modern Germany" to Hilaire Belloc's 1925 book A History of England:

Europe & Britain—perhaps Britain in particular—have an intricate complex history racially and culturally. Nearly all the worst errors come from attempts at false simplifications in the service of this or that theory. I am not a simplifier, dealing with plain polemic discussions in Nordic and Latin, civilized and savage. There is not time to go into all that. I only warn you in case you should suspect that I was a secret Nazi and had gone all Nordic, because I wish to emphasize certain things which the bewildered and tragic nonsense talked in modern Germany has made suspect. Believe me I hate it—though as nonsense it only beats by a narrow margin much that has been written by H. Belloc in the History of England.

=== Opposition to wartime anti-German propaganda ===
Rearick states that Tolkien expressed an anti-racist position during the Second World War. Rearick writes that Tolkien reacted with anger to the excesses of anti-German propaganda during World War II. In a 1944 letter to his son Christopher, Tolkien wrote:

... it is distressing to see the [British] press grovelling in the gutter as low as Goebbels in his prime, shrieking that any German commander who holds out in a desperate situation (when, too, the military needs of his side clearly benefit) is a drunkard, and a besotted fanatic. [...] There was a solemn article in the local [Oxford] paper seriously advocating systematic exterminating of the entire German nation as the only proper course after military victory: because, if you please, they are rattlesnakes, and don't know the difference between good and evil! (What of the writer?) The Germans have just as much right to declare the Poles and Jews exterminable vermin, subhuman, as we have to select the Germans: in other words, no right, whatever they have done.

Carpenter writes in his biography that Tolkien found the war distressing "almost as much for idological as for personal reasons", citing Tolkien's 1941 statement in praise of what he saw as the German virtues "of obedience and patriotism", and lamenting Hitler's ruining "that noble northern spirit [...] which I have ever loved, and tried to present in its true light". The scholar of English literature Robert Tally concurs, writing that the letter showed that "Tolkien's anger was palpable", although that in no way negated the hierarchy of races and their "intramural subdivisions or ethnicities" within Tolkien's legendarium.

=== Opposition to racism in South Africa ===
Commentators including the scholar of English literature Julie Pridmore have noted Tolkien's opposition to South African racism; she describes his views as "advanced in terms of the acceptance of different cultures and ethnicities". During the Second World War, Tolkien's son Christopher, training in South Africa, expressed concern about the treatment of black people at the hands of white people, and his father replied: (Note: Carpenter 2023, #61 to Christopher Tolkien, 19 April 1944)

As for what you say or hint of 'local' conditions: I knew of them. I don't think they have much changed (even for the worse). I used to hear them discussed by my mother; and have ever since taken a special interest in that part of the world. The treatment of colour nearly always horrifies anyone going out from Britain & not only in South Africa. Unfort[unately] not many retain that generous sentiment for long.

Stephen Wigmore wrote in The Spectator that Tolkien explicitly rejected the South African policy of apartheid, racial segregation, in his 1959 speech on retiring as a professor at the University of Oxford. Jefferson in The New Statesman similarly wrote that Tolkien "strongly disapproved of apartheid".

== Legacy ==
Discussions of race in Middle-earth have continued as filmmakers have sought to depict orcs and other races. The journalist David Ibata writes that the orcs in Peter Jackson's Tolkien films look much like "the worst depictions of the Japanese drawn by American and British illustrators during World War II." The science fiction author N. K. Jemisin writes that "Orcs are fruit of the poison vine that is human fear of 'the Other'." Tally calls the orcs a demonised enemy, despite (he writes) Tolkien's objections to the demonisation of the enemy in the two World Wars. Reviewing Robert Stuart's 2022 book Tolkien, Race, and Racism in Middle-earth, Tally writes that while the book is valuable and thorough, Stuart's "desire to absolve Tolkien ... is understandable, but it is important to recognize and to emphasize the truth lest the threats posed by white supremacists ... be too easily dismissed or underestimated."

The Lord of the Rings: The Rings of Power, a series about events in the Second Age long before the events in the War of the Ring, screened from September 2022, has according to Sam Thielman attracted "fierce debate" about its handling of race. This is, Thielman states, through its casting of "people of color" in roles as Dwarves, Harfoots (precursors of Hobbits) and Elves. The casting has pleased some fans but angered others who feel that the fantasy genre is and must remain white. Many of those hostile to the casting have cited a statement misattributed to Tolkien: "Evil cannot create anything new, it can only spoil and destroy". (Note: In the chapter "The Tower of Cirith Ungol" in The Return of the King (Book 6, chapter 1), Tolkien has the character Frodo say "The Shadow that bred them can only mock, it cannot make: not real things of its own. I don't think it gave life to the orcs, it only ruined them and twisted them". (Note: Tolkien 1955. The Return of the King, book 6, ch. 1 "The Tower of Cirith Ungol") A statement by a fictional character may be suggestive of the opinion of the author. See also Tolkien's sentience dilemma.) The cast of the series have spoken out against racism aimed at the actors involved. The fantasy author Neil Gaiman, defending the casting, commented that "Tolkien described the Harfoots as "browner of skin" than the other hobbits. So I think anyone grumbling is either racist or hasn't read their Tolkien." Gaiman had earlier written in a wider context that "White Supremacists don't own Norse Mythology, even if some of them think they do".

Stuart Heritage observed in The Guardian that the Harfoots in The Lord of the Rings: The Rings of Power speak in Irish accents, behave as friendly peasants, and are accompanied by Celtic music; and that they resemble the 19th century caricaturist John Leech's "wildly unflattering" depictions of the Irish in Punch magazine.

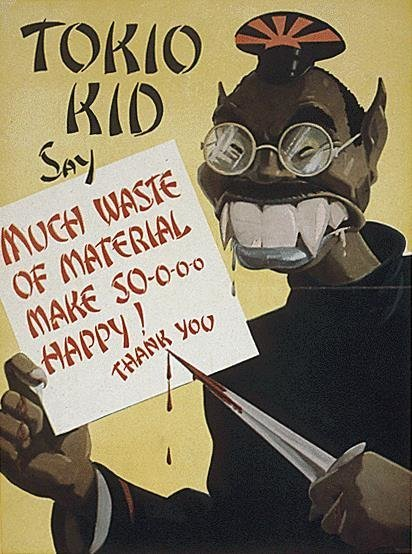
Peter Jackson's film versions of Tolkien's Orcs have been compared to wartime caricatures of the Japanese (here, an American propaganda poster).

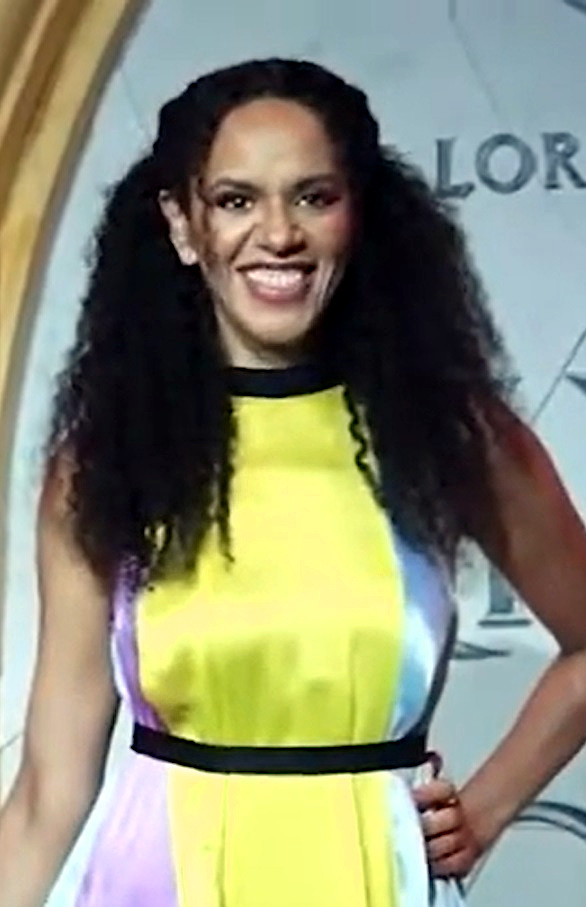
The casting of "people of color" in The Lord of the Rings: The Rings of Power, such as of Sara Zwangobani as a Harfoot, pleased some fans and angered others.

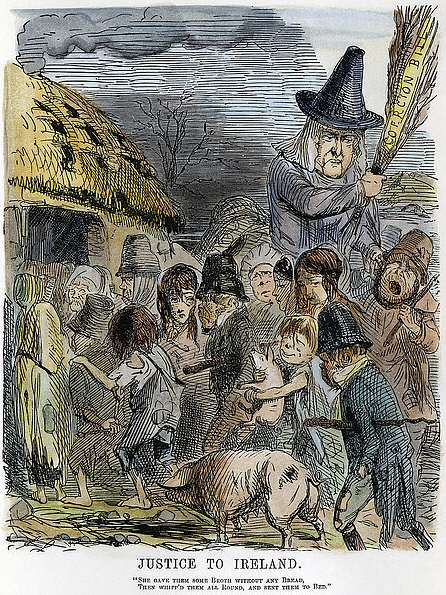
The Harfoots in The Rings of Power speak in Irish accents and have been said to resemble John Leech's Irish peasants, as in his cartoon "Justice to Ireland".
