= The Lay of Aotrou and Itroun =

Poem by J.R.R. Tolkien

- Front cover of the 2016 hardback edition
- Editor: Verlyn Flieger
- Author: J.R.R. Tolkien
- Language: English
- Subject: Celtic mythology
- Genre: Epic poetry
- Published: 3 November 2016 (U.K.)
- Publisher: HarperCollins; Houghton Mifflin Harcourt
- Publication place: United Kingdom
- Media type: Print (hardback)
- Pages: 128
- ISBN: 978-0008202132
- Preceded by: A Secret Vice
- Followed by: Beren and Lúthien

The Lay of Aotrou and Itroun is a poem of 508 lines, written by J. R. R. Tolkien in 1930 and published in Welsh Review in December 1945.

Aotrou and Itroun are Breton words for "lord" and "lady". The poem is modelled on the genre of the "Breton lay" popular in Middle English literature of the 12th century, and it explores the conflict of heroic or chivalric values and Christianity, and their relation to the institution of marriage.

== Sources ==
A major source for the poem has been identified from Breton literature as An Aotrou Nann hag ar Gorigann ("Lord Nann and the Korrigan"), which Tolkien probably knew through Wimberly's Folklore in the English and Scottish Ballads (1928). Tolkien adds to his source a stern moral – repudiation of all traffic with the supernatural and the occult.

== Thematics ==
In the poem, Aotrou and Itroun are a couple of Breton nobility. They are childless, and Aotrou seeks the help of a witch. When Itroun is with child, the witch reappears, revealing herself as the Corrigan, and asks for Aotrou's love as payment. Aotrou sacrifices his knightly honour to Christian values, and breaks his word.

"I gave no love. My love is wed;
my wife now lieth in child-bed,
and I curse the beast that cheated me
and drew me to this dell to thee."

Cursed by the Corrigan to die in three days, Aotrou takes the consequences and places his trust in Providence:

In three days I shall live at ease
and die but when it God doth please
in eld, or in some time to come
in the brave wars of Christendom.

Aotrou died after three days, followed by his wife with a broken heart. They are buried together, and they do not live to see their offspring grow up – something that has been interpreted as a judgement on Aotrou for excessive family pride.

== Publication ==
The lay was originally published in The Welsh Review in 1945 but had been unavailable for decades. A book form, edited by the Tolkien scholar Verlyn Flieger, was published in 2016.

== See also ==
- Gwyn Jones
- List of poems by J. R. R. Tolkien
- Melusine
