= English and Welsh =

1955 J. R. R. Tolkien lecture

"English and Welsh" is J. R. R. Tolkien's inaugural O'Donnell Memorial Lecture of 21 October 1955. The lecture sheds light on Tolkien's conceptions of the connections of race, ethnicity, and language.

== Publication ==
It was first published in Angles and Britons in 1963 and was republished in The Monsters and the Critics, and Other Essays in 1983.

== Contents ==
Tolkien begins with an overview of the terms "British", "Celtic", "Germanic", "Saxon", "English" and "Welsh", explaining the last term's etymology in walha.

He gives his view of what makes a nation or "people" and the importance of language by quoting Icelandic priest and nationalist Sjéra Tómas Sæmundsson:

Languages are the chief distinguishing marks of peoples. No people in fact comes into being until it speaks a language of its own; let the languages perish and the peoples perish too, or become different peoples. But that never happens except as the result of oppression and distress.

Tolkien also addresses the historical language contact between English and Welsh since the Anglo-Saxon settlement of Britain, including Welsh loanwords and substrate influence found in English, and conversely English loanwords in Welsh. Comparing the Germanic i-mutation and the Celtic affection, Tolkien says:

The north-west of Europe, in spite of its underlying differences of linguistic heritage – Goidelic, Brittonic, Gallic; its varieties of Germanic; and the powerful intrusion of spoken Latin – is as it were a single philological province, a region so interconnected in race, culture, history, and linguistic fusions that its departmental philologies cannot flourish in isolation.

In the final part of the lecture Tolkien explores the concept of phonaesthetics, citing "cellar door" as a phrase recognised as sounding beautiful in English and adding that, to his own taste, in Welsh "cellar doors are extraordinarily frequent". Tolkien describes the working of phonaesthetics inherent in the moment of association of sound and meaning:

[T]his pleasure is felt most immediately and acutely in the moment of association: that is in the reception (or imagination) of a word-form which is felt to have a certain style, and the attribution to it of a meaning which is not received through it.

Tolkien alludes to his view that such tastes are inherited, "an aspect in linguistic terms of our individual natures. And since these are largely historical products, the predilections must be so too." To refer to such an inherited taste of language, Tolkien introduces the term "native tongue" as opposed to "cradle tongue".

== Influence ==
Tolkien notes in his lecture that "Most English-speaking people … will admit that 'cellar door' is beautiful, especially if dissociated from its sense and from its spelling. More beautiful than, say, 'sky', and far more beautiful than 'beautiful' … Well then, in Welsh, for me cellar doors are extraordinarily frequent." This interest in and appreciation of Welsh influenced his own invented languages, notably the Elvish language Sindarin.

This lecture is considered Tolkien's "last major learned work". There are several important aspects to it. First, it "includes a valuable contribution to the study of the place of Britons in Anglo-Saxon England". Secondly, it offers a warning against racial theories. Third, it presents Tolkien's hypothesis of "inborn" linguistic tastes, which then leads into a discussion of his own views of aesthetics in language. Finally, it provides a (correct) hypothesis on the origins of the word "w(e)alh", which in turn provides an explanation of what happened to Celtic when the Anglo-Saxons invaded.
