= Brittonicisms in English =

Historic linguistic effect of British Celtics

Brittonicisms in English are the linguistic effects in English attributed to the historical influence of Brittonic (i.e. British Celtic) speakers as they switched language to English following the Anglo-Saxon settlement of Britain and the establishment of Anglo-Saxon political dominance in Britain.

Table 1: A number of possible shift features selected as representative by Richard Coates, Gary Miller and Raymond Hickey* regional, northern England; ** regional, southwestern England
Features	Coates	Miller	Hickey
Two functionally distinct 'to be' verbs	✔	✔	✔
Northern subject rule *	✔	✔	✔
Development of reflexives	✔	✔	
Rise of progressive		✔	✔
Loss of external possessor		✔	✔
Rise of the periphrastic "do"		✔	✔
Negative comparative particle *	✔		
Rise of pronoun -en **	✔		
Merger of /kw-/, /hw-/ and /χw-/ *	✔		
Rise of "it" clefts		✔	
Rise of sentential answers and tagging		✔	
Preservation of θ and ð			✔
Loss of front rounded vowels			✔

The research into this topic uses a variety of approaches to approximate the Romano-British language spoken in Sub-Roman Britain on the eve of the Anglo-Saxon arrival. Besides the earliest extant Old Welsh texts, Breton is useful for its lack of English influence.

The Brittonic substratum influence on English is considered to be very small, but a number of publications in the 2000s (decade) suggested that its influence may have been underestimated. Some of the developments differentiating Old English from Middle English have been proposed as an emergence of a previously unrecorded Brittonic influence.

There are many, often obscure, characteristics in English that have been proposed as Brittonicisms. White enumerates 92 items, of which 32 are attributed to other academic works. However, these theories have not become a part of the mainstream view of the history of English.

== History of research ==
The received view that Romano-British impact on English has been minimal on all levels became established at the beginning of the 20th century following work by such scholars as Otto Jespersen (1905) and Max Förster (1921). Opposing views by Wolfgang Keller (1925), Ingerid Dal (1952), Gerard Visser (1955), Walther Preusler (1956), and Patricia Poussa (1990) were marginal to the academic consensus of their time. Oxford philologist and author J. R. R. Tolkien expressed his suspicion of Brittonic influence and pointed out some anomalies in support of this view in his 1955 valedictory lecture English and Welsh, in which Tolkien cites Förster.

Research on Romano-British influence in English intensified in the 2000s, principally centring on The Celtic Englishes programmes in Germany (Potsdam University) and The Celtic Roots of English programme in Finland (University of Joensuu).

The review of the extent of Romano-British influence has been encouraged by developments in several fields. Significant survival of Brittonic peoples in Anglo-Saxon England has become a more widely accepted idea thanks primarily to recent archaeological and genetic evidence. According to a previously held model, the Romano-Britons of England were to a large extent exterminated or somehow pushed out of England – affecting their ability to influence language. There is now a much greater body of research into language contact and a greater understanding of language contact types. The works of Sarah Thomason and Terrence Kaufman have been used in particular to model borrowing and language shift. The research uses investigations into varieties of “Celtic” English (that is, Welsh English, Irish English, etc.) which reveal characteristics more certainly attributable to Celtic languages and also universal contact trends revealed by other varieties of English.

== Old English ==
=== Diglossia model ===
Endorsed particularly by Hildegard Tristram (2004), the Old English diglossia model proposes that much of the native Romano-British population remained in Northern and Western England, and the Anglo-Saxons gradually took over the rule of those regions. Over a long period, the Brittonic population imperfectly learnt the Anglo-Saxons' language, and Old English continued in an artificially-stable form as the written language of the elite, which was the only version of English to be preserved in writing. After the Norman conquerors removed Anglo-Saxon rule, the dialects of the general population, which would have included Brithonic and Norse-influenced versions of English, were eventually recorded and appear as Middle English.

That kind of variance between written and spoken language is attested historically in other cultures, notably in Latin, and may occur commonly. For instance, Moroccan Arabic (Darija) and other colloquial varieties of Arabic have had virtually no literary presence in over a millennium; the substantial Berber substratum in Darija (and likewise, the Coptic substratum in Egyptian, etc.) would not appear in any significant works in Arabic until the late 20th century, when Darija, along with the other varieties of Arabic, began to be written down in quantity.

The notion that such a diglossia could have existed in England, however, has been challenged by several linguists. Robert McColl Millar, for example, has pointed out that many works written in Old English, such as Ælfric's homilies, seem to be intended for a “large and undifferentiated audience,” suggesting that the language they were written in was not different from the language of the common people. He further concludes that “the idea that this state could continue for hundreds of years seems most unlikely,” noting further that no document from the time alludes to such a situation (by contrast, in Gaul, references are made to the lingua romana rustica as being different from written Latin). John Insley has stated that "there is not a scrap of evidence for [a] 'Late British-derived Old English.'"

=== Substantive verb – consuetudinal tense byð ===
The claim depends on assuming that Old English is unusual as a Germanic language in its use of two forms of the verb "to be," but all other Germanic languages also exhibit the two verbs "be" with similar semantics. Thus, the evidence probably is more suggestive of a common inheritance than substratum influence, but that substratum influence could be claimed also for many parts of Continental Europe, which were formerly Celtic but are now Germanic. The b- form is used in a habitual sense and the third-person singular form, byð, has the same distinction of functions and is associated with a similar phonetic form in the Brittonic *bið (Welsh bydd, Middle Breton bout, Cornish boaz). biðun, the third-person plural form, is also used in Northern texts and seems to parallel the Brittonic byddant. Though the claim is made that the biðun form is particularly difficult to explain as a Germanic-language construct but is consistent with the Brittonic system, the form fits into regular Germanic to Anglian sound changes.

== Transition to Middle English ==
=== Change from syntheticism towards analyticism ===
The development from Old English to Middle English is marked particularly by a change from syntheticism (expressing meaning by word-endings) to analyticism (expressing meaning by word order). Old English was a synthetic language, but its inflections already tended to be simpler than those of contemporary Continental Germanic languages. There are different word endings for case (roughly speaking, endings for the direct object of a sentence, the subject of a sentence and similarly for two other grammatical situations (not including instrumental)) varying for plural forms, gender forms and two kinds of word form (called weak and strong). This system is partially retained in modern Germanic languages, especially German, Icelandic and Faroese. Brittonic, however, was already a highly analytic language and so Brittonic peoples may have had difficulty learning Old English. It has been suggested that the Brittonic Latin of the period demonstrates difficulty in using the Latin word endings.

Some language innovations occurred primarily in texts from Northern and South-Western England, which are in theory the areas with the greater density of Brittonic people. In the Northern zone of that period, there was the partial replacement of the Anglo-Saxon rule by Norse invaders. The situation can variously be seen as mitigating the emergence of Brittonic English or as the direct cause of the Northern language innovations (the Middle English creole hypothesis). Tristram argues that contact with speakers of both Brittonic and Norse explains the language innovations in texts from Northern England. The attrition in word endings, as witnessed by the loss of the nasal endings (m, n), had begun before the Norse invasion.

These innovations in the Northern zone texts are associated by Tristram with Brittonic influence:

- Old English had case and gender word endings for nouns, pronouns and adjectives, but Brittonic then did not have those endings. The endings in English have since been lost.
- Old English had several versions of the word "the", and Brittonic then had only one. The variations of "the" have been lost in English. The lack of different forms is an unusual language feature and is shared only by Celtic and English in the region.
- English developed a fixed word order, which was present earlier in Brittonic

However, Millar argues that “in all of the modern Germanic languages, there has been some movement away from a synthetic towards an analytic typology.... it can therefore be suggested that the changes involved are ‘hard-wired’ in all the Germanic languages....” He concludes that Norse is the most likely origin for the losses, based on the geographical distribution of the initial stages of change correlating strongly with Viking settlement patterns. Insley considers the native word-initial stress pattern in Old English to be a reason for the loss.

Innovations in the South-Western zone texts:

- Rise of the periphrastic aspect, particularly the progressive form (i.e. BE verb-ing: I am writing, she was singing etc.). The progressive form developed in the change from Old English to Middle English. Similar constructs are rare in Germanic languages and not completely analogous. Celtic usage has chronological precedence and high usage. Celtic English varieties employ the structure more than Standard English: "It was meaning right the opposite", Manx English Other linguists have demonstrated that the form likely arose from two constructions that were used fairly rarely in Old and Early Middle English. The first construction used a form of beon/wesan (to be/to become) with the present participle -ende and has an analogous form in Dutch. The second construction used beon/wesan, a preposition, and -unge, a gerund, and has been variously proposed as being influenced by similar forms in Latin and Old French or Brittonic, though evidence one way or another is scant.

Over the course of Middle English, sound shifts meant that the -ende participle ending and the -unge gerund ending merged into the new ending -ing. The change, which was complete in Southern England around the late 15th century and spread north from there, rendered participles and gerunds indistinguishable. It is at that point that a sudden increase in the use of progressive forms became visible though they would not take their current form until the 18th century. Herbert Schendl has concluded that "with this feature, a polygenetic origin... seems attractive, and at least the further extension of the progressive is a language-internal development."

- Do-periphrasis in a variety of uses. Modern English is dependent on a semantically-neutral 'do' in some negative statements and questions, e.g. 'I don't know' rather than 'I know not'. This feature is linguistically very rare although all West Germanic languages except Afrikaans can use "do" as an auxiliary. The Celtic languages use a similar structure but without dependence. The usage is frequent in Middle and Modern Cornish – e.g. Omma ny wreugh why tryge 'You do not stay here' – and it was used in Middle Breton. 'Do' is more common in Celtic English varieties than Standard English. There are, however, other theories for how the feature developed in Standard English. The key difficulty in explaining the form as a Brittonicism is its late appearance in the language since it arose in the fifteenth century. Thus, several linguists have proposed that it developed independently during the transition between Middle and Early Modern English.

== Various possible Brittonicisms ==
=== Loss of weorþan ===
In Old English, the common verb weorþan existed (cognate with Dutch worden and German werden) and meant "become", which is today mostly replaced by motion verbs like "go" and "come:" "What shall worthe of us twoo!" That use of motion verbs occurs in Celtic texts with relative frequency:. "acam hynny yd aeth Kyledyr yg gwyllt" = "and because of this Kyledyr went mad" (Middle Welsh, where aeth = 'went').

=== Rise in use of complex syntactic structures ===
English construction of complex sentences uses some forms which in popularity may suggest a Celtic influence. Clefting in Old Welsh literature preceded its common use in English by perhaps 400 years, depending on the dating of Welsh texts. Cleft constructions are more common in Breton French than Standard French and more common and versatile in Celtic English than Standard English. Clefting may be linked to the rise of a fixed word order after the loss of inflections.

=== Uses of himself, herself etc. ===
The Celtic languages and English have the same intensifier and reflexive pronouns. They share that feature with only Maltese, Finnish, Estonian and Hungarian in Europe. In Middle English, the old intensifier "self" was replaced by a fusion of pronoun + "self," which is now used in a communication to emphasise the object in questions: "A woman who is conspicuously generous to others less fortunate than herself." Such phrasing is also found in Scots and Irish English ("himself" is often used in place of "him" in the colloquial speech of the latter).

=== Northern subject rule ===
The Northern subject rule was the general pattern of syntax used for the present tense in northern Middle English and still occurs in Modern English dialects. The third-person singular verb is used for third-person plural subjects unless the pronoun, "they", is used and is directly adjacent to the verb: "they sing", "they only sings", "birds sings". That anti-agreement is standard in Modern Welsh except for the adjacency condition. It had general usage in Old Welsh and therefore presumably in Cumbric.

It has also been argued to be a language-internal development that arose during Middle English. The lack of northern texts in Old English means that explaining the origin of the rule with any degree of certainty is difficult.

=== Lack of external possessor ===
English does not make use of the more cumbersome external possessor (an indirect object that acts as the possessor of the direct object of a transitive verb). The only other European languages without that feature are Lezgian, Turkish, Welsh and Breton. All of the others have an external possessor option or conventional usage. An option exists in Swedish for "she washed (tvättade) his hair": grammatically internally: Hon tvättade hans hår; externally: Hon tvättade håret på honom (literally "she washed the hair on him"). In Modern French, that form is predominant as to the reflexive elle s'est lavé les cheveux ("she washed her hair") and is otherwise sometimes conventional. Old English used it such as Seo cwen het þa þæm cyninge þæt heafod of aceorfan, literally "The Queen had them the King the head off cut", which mirrors exactly the syntax of Modern German: Die Königin ließ sie, dem König den Kopf ab(zu)schneiden.

Modern English uses only an internal possessor (an ordinary possessive construction within the direct object): "The Queen had them cut off the King's head".

=== Tag questions and answers ===
The statistical bias historically towards the use of tag questions and answers in English, instead of simply "yes" or "no," has been attributed to Celtic influence. The Celtic languages do not use "yes" and "no," and answers are made by using the appropriate verb. For example, Welsh dych chi'n hoffi siocled? Ydw, dw i'n hoffi siocled 'do you like chocolate? I do, I like chocolate.', or more literally: 'are you liking chocolate? I am, I am liking chocolate.'. In this case, ydw is not "yes" but rather the first-person present tense conjugation of fyddo "to be," which is appropriate only as the positive response to a question (the neutral or negative conjugation would be dwi or dw i).

== Phonetics ==
Among the phonetic anomalies is the continued use of [w], [θ] and [ð] in Modern English (win, breath, breathe). The use of those sounds in the Germanic languages has generally been unstable, and it has been posited that the continual influence of Celtic may have had a supportive effect in preserving their use in English. The legitimacy of that evidence has been disputed.

The use of one or more of those phonemes has been preserved in other Germanic languages such as Elfdalian, Icelandic, and some dialects of Dutch. Kenneth Jackson commented that it is “impossible to point to any feature about Anglo-Saxon phonology which can be shown conclusively to be a modification due to the alien linguistic habits of the Britons.”

== See also ==
- List of English words of Welsh origin
- History of the English language
- List of English words of Brittonic origin
- Celtic language-death in England

== Bibliography ==
- Coates, Richard (2010). "English and Celtic in contact". Review. Language. 86 (2). Linguistic Society of America: 441–444. doi:10.1353/lan.0.0222. JSTOR 40666330.
- Filppula, Markku; Klemola, Juhani; Paulasto, Heli (2008), English and Celtic in Contact, Routledge, ISBN 9780415636728
- Filppula, Markku (2010), "Contact and the Early History of English", in Hickey, Raymond (ed.), Handbook of language contact, Blackwell, pp. 432–453, doi:10.1002/9781444318159.ch21, ISBN 978-1-4051-7580-7
- German, Gary (2001), "The genesis of analytic structure in English: the case for a Brittonic substratum", in Regis, Jean-Paul (ed.), Travaux de Diachronie 2, Groupe de Recherches Anglo-Américaines de Tours, vol. 24, Presses universitaires François-Rabelais, pp. 125–141, ISBN 978-2-86906-504-8
- Isaac, Graham R. (September 2001). "Diagnosing the Symptoms of Contact: Some Celtic-English Case Histories". In Tristram, Hildegard L.C. (ed.). The Celtic Englishes III. 3rd International Colloquium on the "Celtic Englishes". Golm, Germany: University of Potsdam. pp. 46–64. ISBN 978-3-8253-1241-1.
- Insley, John (2019). "Britons and Anglo-Saxons". In Haubrichs, Wolfgang; Jochum-Godglück, Christa (eds.). Kulturelle Integration und Personennamen im Mittelalter [Cultural Integration and Personal Names in the Middle Ages]. Ergänzungsbände zum Reallexikon der Germanischen Altertumskunde. Vol. 108. De Gruyter. p. 264. doi:10.1515/9783110268850-011. ISBN 9783110268737.
- Langer, Nils (2001). Linguistic Purism in Action: How auxiliary tun was stigmatized in Early New High German. Studia Linguistica Germanica. Vol. 60. de Gruyter. doi:10.1515/9783110881103. ISBN 9783110881103.
- McWhorter, John (2006). "What else happened to English? A brief for the Celtic Hypothesis". English Language and Linguistics. 13 (2): 163–191. doi:10.1017/S1360674309002974. S2CID 120967676.
- Schendl, Herbert (2012). "Middle English: Language contact". In Bergs, Alexander; Brinton, Laurel J. (eds.). English Historical Linguistics: An International Handbook. Handbücher zur Sprach- und Kommunikationswissenschaft / Handbooks of Linguistics and Communication Science (HSK). Vol. 1. De Gruyter Mouton. pp. 505–519. doi:10.1515/9783110251593.505. ISBN 9783110202205.
- Tolkien, John Ronald Reuel (1983), "English and Welsh", in Tolkien, Christopher R. (ed.), The Monsters and the Critics, and Other Essays, London: Harper Collins, pp. 162–197, ISBN 026110263X
- Tristram, Hildegard L.C. (2004), "Diglossia in Anglo-Saxon England, or what was spoken Old English like?" (PDF), Studia Anglica Posnaniensia, 40: 87–110
- White, David L. (September 2004). "On the Areal Pattern of 'Brittonicity' in English and Its Implications" (PDF). In Tristram, Hildegard L.C. (ed.). Celtic Englishes IV: The interface between English and the Celtic Languages. 4th International Colloquium on the "Celtic Englishes". Golm, Germany: University of Potsdam. p. 261. ISBN 9783939469063.
- Vennemann gen. Nierfield, Theo (2005), English – a German dialect? (PDF), p. 18, archived from the original (PDF) on 19 July 2011
