= Goblin Feet =

Early poem by J. R. R. Tolkien

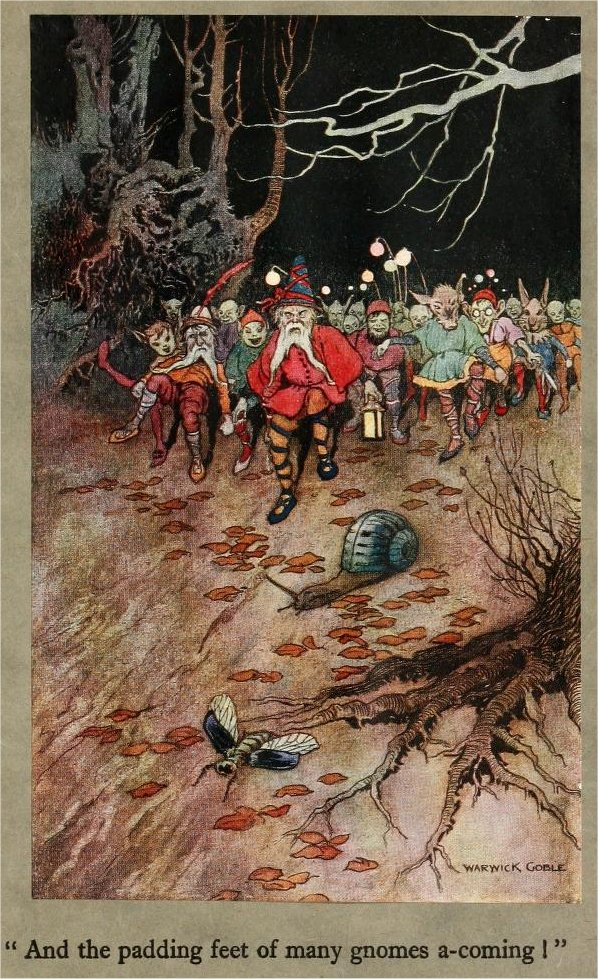
An accompanying illustration to the poem by Warwick Goble from The Book of Fairy Poetry (1920)

"Goblin Feet" is a poem written in 1915 by J. R. R. Tolkien for Edith Mary Bratt, his wife-to-be. It celebrates the diminutive type of elf that Tolkien soon came to dislike, and he regretted having published the poem.

== Poem ==
"Goblin Feet" was published in Oxford poetry 1915 before being reprinted in anthologies such as The Book of Fairy Poetry (1920): it thus marks Tolkien's first appearance in the capacity of a writer for children. It was his first notable published work.

His fiancée had expressed her liking for “spring and flowers and trees, and little elfin people”, and the poem with its rather twee references to “the tiny horns of enchanted leprechauns...their little happy feet” reflects her preferences. Tolkien himself would later wish that “the unhappy thing, representing all that I came (so soon after) to fervently dislike, could be buried for ever”.

"Goblin Feet" reflects one strand in the twin elf traditions Tolkien inherited – the frivolous, small-scale, singing and dancing elves of the Edwardians, as opposed to the medieval-style warrior elves who would become the mainstream of his legendarium.

Tolkien's use of words like 'flittermouse' for bat in the poem mark an important opening of his philological interests into his fairy world.

== See also ==
- J. R. R. Tolkien bibliography
