= Dimitra Fimi =

Scottish academic and author

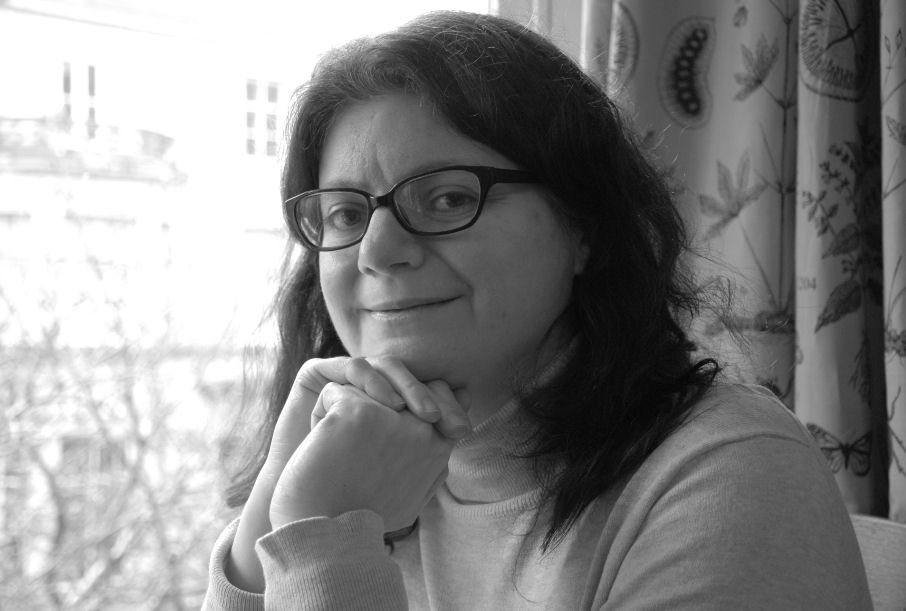
- Dimitra in 2020
- Born: 2 June 1978 (age 48)
- Known for: Tolkien scholarship

Academic background
- Education: Cardiff University

Academic work
- Main interests: Folklore, Celtic mythology
- Notable works: Tolkien, Race and Cultural History

Dimitra Fimi (born 2 June 1978) is a Greek academic and writer. She became the Professor of Fantasy and Children's Literature at the University of Glasgow in 2023. Her field of research includes the writings of J. R. R. Tolkien and children's fantasy literature.

== Biography ==
=== Early life ===
From the island of Salamis in the Greek region of Attica, the daughter of teachers Pavlos Fimis and Theodora Papaliveriou-Fimi, she attended the 1st General Lyceum of Salamis from where she graduated in 1996. Fimi gained her BA degree at the University of Athens in 2000 before completing her MA in Early Celtic Studies (2002) and PhD in English Literature (2005) at Cardiff University.

=== Career ===
From 2009 to 2018, she was a lecturer in English at Cardiff Metropolitan University, having previously taught at Cardiff University and the Open University. In September 2018 she was appointed Lecturer in Fantasy and Children's Literature at the University of Glasgow, the first time the term “fantasy” has ever been used in an academic post title in the UK. In September 2020 she was appointed Co-Director of the Centre for Fantasy and the Fantastic at the University of Glasgow, to lecture on fantasy and children's literature. She is a Visiting Lecturer in English Literature at Signum University, an online learning facility.

=== Tolkien scholar ===
Her doctoral thesis on the vexed issue of Tolkien and race was published as the monograph Tolkien, Race and Cultural History (Palgrave Macmillan, 2008). It won the Mythopoeic Scholarship Award for Inklings Studies in 2010, and was shortlisted for the Katharine Briggs Folklore Award. With Andrew Higgins she is co-editor of A Secret Vice: Tolkien on Invented Languages (HarperCollins, 2016) which won the Tolkien Society Award for Best Book in 2017.

== Awards and distinctions ==
Fimi's other works include Celtic Myth in Contemporary Children's Fantasy (Palgrave Macmillan, 2017) which was the runner-up for the Katharine Briggs Folklore Award. She was one of the judges of the Wales Book of the Year Award 2017 and was selected for the Welsh Crucible in 2017. She has contributed chapters in A Companion to J. R. R. Tolkien (Blackwell, 2014), and Revisiting Imaginary Worlds: A Subcreation Studies Anthology (Routledge, 2016). She is a member of The Tolkien Society and has written articles for magazines and websites including the Times Literary Supplement and The Conversation. She appears regularly on BBC Radio Wales.

== Books ==
Written

- Fimi, Dimitra (2010) [2008]. Tolkien, Race, and Cultural History: From Fairies to Hobbits. Palgrave Macmillan. ISBN 978-0-230-21951-9. OCLC 222251097.
- Celtic Myth in Contemporary Children's Fantasy (Palgrave Macmillan, 2017)

Edited

- (with Andrew Higgins) A Secret Vice: Tolkien on Invented Languages (HarperCollins, 2016)
