= Chaucer as a Philologist: The Reeve's Tale =

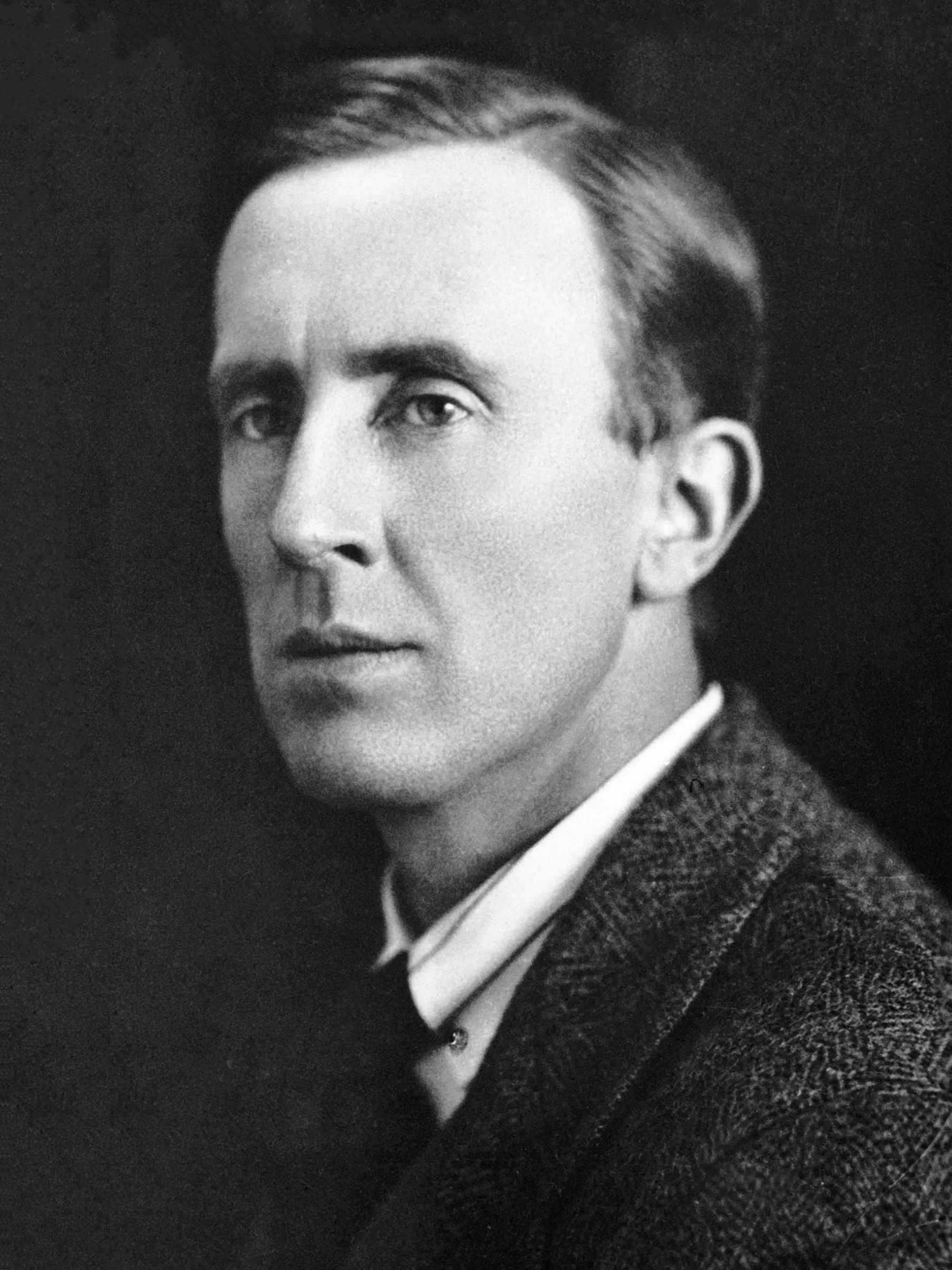
Tolkien c. 1925

"Chaucer as a Philologist: The Reeve's Tale" is a paper by J. R. R. Tolkien on "The Reeve's Tale", one of the constituent poems of Geoffrey Chaucer's fourteenth century Middle English cycle of poems and stories The Canterbury Tales. It was originally read at a meeting of the Philological Society in Oxford on Saturday, 16 May 1931, and subsequently published in Transactions of the Philological Society, Volume 33, Issue 1, November 1934. The delay in publication was explained as "principally due to hesitation in putting forward a study, for which closer investigation of words, and more still a much fuller array of readings from MSS. of the Reeve’s Tale, were so plainly needed." Not having had the opportunity for either, Tolkien "therefore presented [the paper] with apologies, practically as it was read, with the addition of a 'critical text', and accompanying textual notes, as well as of various footnotes, appendices, and comments naturally omitted in reading."

The work focuses on the Northern dialect humour Chaucer incorporates into the tale, which Tolkien characterizes as representing at the same time "a most unusual piece of dramatic realism," "the byproduct of a private philological curiosity, used with a secret smile to give some life and individuality to a fabliau of trite sort," and a "pander[ing] to popular linguistic prejudices—ranking with what passes for Scotch, Welsh, Yorkshire, or American in supposedly funny stories of to-day." He attributes Chaucer's use of dialect to "a private philological interest, and a knowledge, too, of 'dialect' spoken and written, greater than was usual in his day." Tolkien goes on to examine the dialect passages based on "the facsimile of the Ellesmere MS.; and on the Six-Text 11 and the Harleian MS. 7334 (Hl) printed by the Chaucer Society," while noting that "a more extensive investigation of other MSS. is obviously required."

Tolkien later returned to the subject in a recitation of a slightly abridged version of "The Reeve's Tale" at the Oxford "Summer Diversions" on 28 July 1939, in connection with which a pamphlet (The Reeve's Tale: version prepared for recitation at the 'summer diversions', Oxford, 14 pp.) was issued containing his prefatory remarks and the text of his abridgement. This work is more accessible, having been prepared for a general audience.
