= List of English words of Welsh origin =

This is a list of English language words of Welsh language origin. As with the Goidelic languages, the Brythonic tongues are close enough for possible derivations from Cumbric, Cornish or Breton in some cases.

Beyond the acquisition of common nouns, there are numerous English toponyms, surnames, personal names or nicknames derived from Welsh (see Celtic toponymy, Celtic onomastics).

== List ==
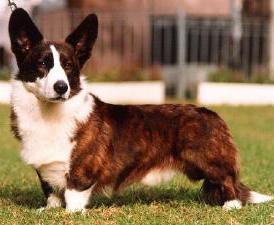
Welsh Corgi

=== As main word choice for meaning ===
bara brith
speckled bread. Traditional Welsh bread flavoured with tea, dried fruits and mixed spices.
bard
from Old Celtic bardos, either through Welsh bardd (where the bard was highly respected) or Scottish bardis (where it was a term of contempt); Cornish bardh
cawl
a traditional Welsh soup/stew; Cornish kowl
coracle
from corwgl. This Welsh term was derived from the Latin corium meaning "leather or hide", the material from which coracles are made.
corgi
from cor, "dwarf" + gi (soft mutation of ci), "dog".
cwm
(very specific geographic sense today) or coomb/combe (dated). Cornish; komm; passed into Old English where sometimes written 'cumb'
flannel
the Oxford English Dictionary says the etymology is "uncertain", but Welsh gwlanen = "flannel wool" is likely. An alternative source is Old French flaine, "blanket". The word has been adopted in most European languages. An earlier English form was flannen, which supports the Welsh etymology. Shakspeare's The Merry Wives of Windsor contains the term "the Welsh flannel".
flummery
from llymru
pikelet
a type of small, thick pancake. Derived from the Welsh bara pyglyd, meaning "pitchy [i.e. dark or sticky] bread", later shortened simply to pyglyd; The early 17th century lexicographer, Randle Cotgrave, spoke of "our Welsh barrapycleds". The word spread initially to the West Midlands of England, where it was anglicised to picklets and then to pikelets. The first recognisable crumpet-type recipe was for picklets, published in 1769 by Elizabeth Raffald in The Experienced English Housekeeper.
wrasse
a kind of sea fish (derived via Cornish wrach, Welsh gwrach (meaning hag or witch)).

=== Esoteric or specialist ===
cist
(archaeological) a stone-lined coffin
cromlech
from crom llech literally "crooked flat stone"
crwth
"a bowed lyre"
kistvaen
from cist (chest) and maen (stone).
lech /lɛk/
capstone of a cromlech, see above
tref
meaning “hamlet, home, town.”; Cornish tre.

== Words with indirect or possible links ==
Similar cognates across Goidelic (gaelic), Latin, Old French and the other Brittonic families makes isolating a precise origin hard. This applies to cross from Latin crux, Old Irish cros overtaking Old English rood; appearing in Welsh and Cornish as Croes, Krows. It complicates Old Welsh attributions for, in popular and technical topography, Tor (OW tŵr) and crag (Old Welsh carreg or craig) with competing Celtic derivations, direct and indirect, for the Old English antecedents.

coombe
meaning "valley", is usually linked with the Welsh cwm, also meaning "valley", Cornish and Breton komm. However, the OED traces both words back to an earlier Celtic word, *kumbos. It suggests a direct Old English derivation for "coombe".
crumpet
Welsh crempog, cramwyth, Cornish krampoeth or Breton Krampouezh; 'little hearth cakes'
druid
From the Old Celtic derwijes/derwos ("true knowledge" or literally "they who know the oak") from which the modern Welsh word derwydd evolved, but travelled to English through Latin (druidae) and French (druide)
gull
from either Welsh or Cornish; Welsh gwylan, Cornish guilan, Breton goelann; all from O.Celt. *voilenno- "gull" (OE mæw)
penguin
possibly from pen gwyn, "white head". "The fact that the penguin has a black head is no serious objection." It may also be derived from the Breton language, or the Cornish Language, which are all closely related. However, dictionaries suggest the derivation is from Welsh pen "head" and gwyn "white", including the Oxford English Dictionary, the American Heritage Dictionary, the Century Dictionary and Merriam-Webster, on the basis that the name was originally applied to the great auk, which had white spots in front of its eyes (although its head was black). Pen gwyn is identical in Cornish and in Breton. An alternative etymology links the word to Latin pinguis, which means "fat". In Dutch, the alternative word for penguin is "fat-goose" (vetgans see: Dutch wiki or dictionaries under Pinguïn), and would indicate this bird received its name from its appearance.
Mither
An English word possibly from the Welsh word "moedro" meaning to bother or pester someone. Possible links to the Yorkshire variant "moither"

== In Welsh English ==
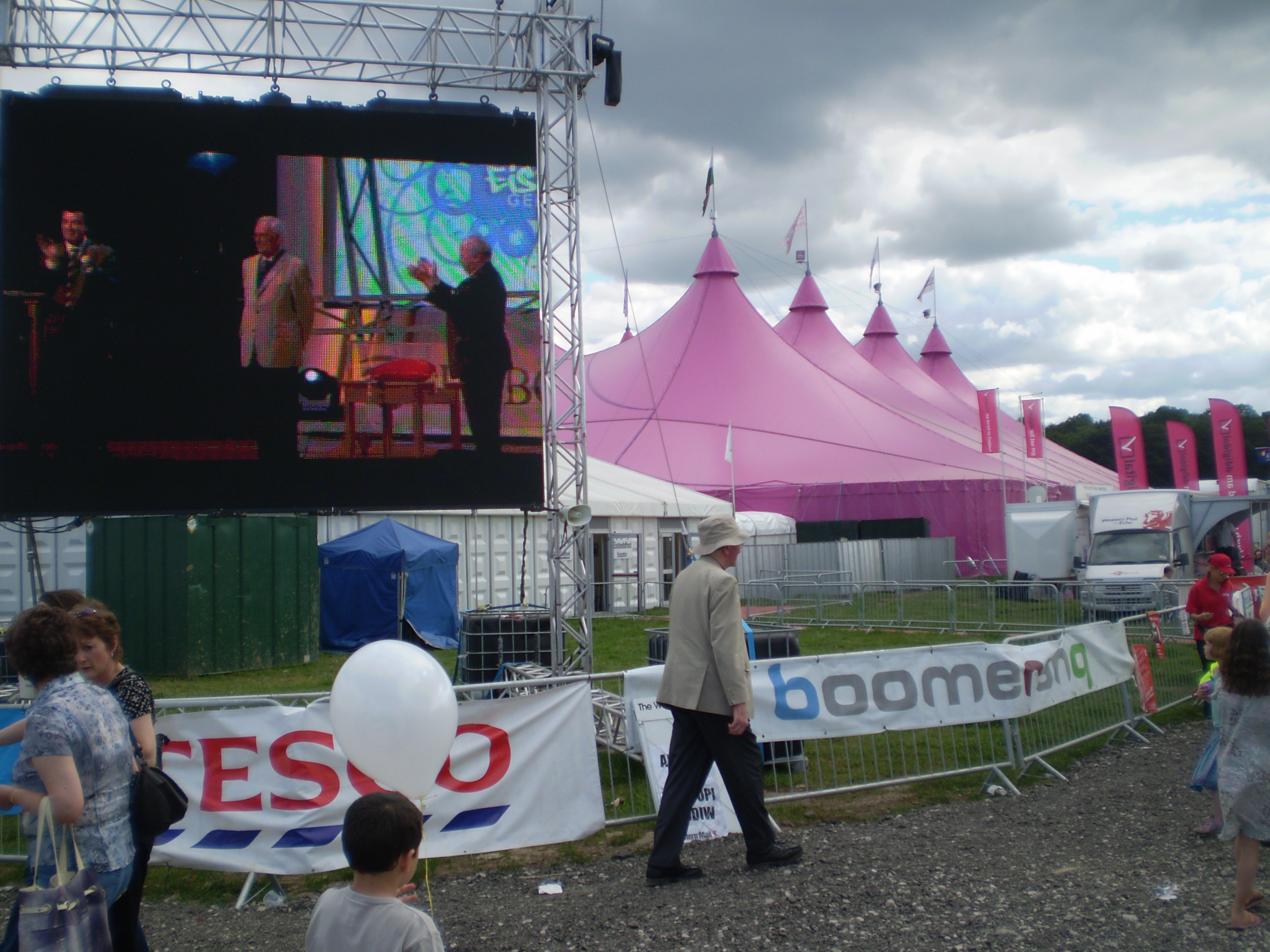
Eisteddfod

These are the words widely used by Welsh English speakers, with little or no Welsh, and are used with original spelling (largely used in Wales but less often by others when referring to Wales):

afon
river
awdl
ode
bach
literally "small", a term of affection
cromlech
defined at esoteric/specialist terms section above
cwm
a valley
crwth
originally meaning "swelling" or "pregnant"
cwrw
Welsh ale or beer
cwtch
hug, cuddle, small cupboard, dog's kennel/bed
cynghanedd
eisteddfod
broad cultural festival, "session/sitting" from eistedd "to sit" (from sedd "seat," cognate with L. sedere; see sedentary) + bod "to be" (cognate with O.E. beon; see be).

Urdd Eisteddfod (in Welsh "Eisteddfod Yr Urdd"), the youth Eisteddfod

englyn
gorsedd
hiraeth
homesickness tinged with grief or sadness over the lost or departed. It is a mix of longing, yearning, nostalgia, wistfulness, or an earnest desire.
hwyl
iechyd da
cheers, or literally "good health"
mochyn
pig
nant
stream
sglod, sglods
latter contrasts to Welsh plural which is sglodion. Chips (England); fries (United States); french-fried potatoes such as from takeaways (used in Flintshire)
twp/dwp
idiotic, daft
ych â fi
an expression of disgust

== See also ==
- Lists of English words of Celtic origin
  - List of English words of Brittonic origin
- Brittonicisms in English

== Sources ==
- Oxford English Dictionary
