= The Monsters and the Critics, and Other Essays =

1983 collection of essays by J.R.R. Tolkien

- First edition
- Editor: Christopher Tolkien
- Author: J. R. R. Tolkien
- Language: English
- Subjects: Anglo-Saxon mythology Old English poetry Philology; Welsh language Conlanging; Mythology
- Publisher: George Allen & Unwin, Houghton Mifflin
- Publication date: 1983
- Publication place: United Kingdom
- ISBN: 978-0261102637
- OCLC: 9945117
- Dewey Decimal: 820/.9 19
- LC Class: PE27 .T65 1983
- Preceded by: Finn and Hengest
- Followed by: The Book of Lost Tales

The Monsters and the Critics, and Other Essays is a collection of J. R. R. Tolkien's scholarly linguistic essays edited by his son Christopher and published posthumously in 1983.

All of them were initially delivered as lectures to academics, with the exception of "On Translating Beowulf", which Christopher Tolkien notes in his foreword is not addressed to an academic audience.

== Essays ==
The essays are:

- "Beowulf: The Monsters and the Critics" looks at the critics' understanding of Beowulf, and proposes instead a fresh take on the poem.
- "On Translating Beowulf" looks at the difficulties in translating the poem from Old English.
- "On Fairy-Stories", the 1939 Andrew Lang lecture at St Andrews University, is a defence of the fantasy genre.
- "A Secret Vice" talks about creating imaginary languages, giving background to Tolkien's Quenya and Sindarin.
- "Sir Gawain and the Green Knight" is a study of the medieval poem of the same name.
- "English and Welsh", the inaugural O'Donnell Memorial Lecture (1955), is a survey of the historical relationship between the two tongues, including an analysis of the word Welsh.
- "Valedictory Address to the University of Oxford", given upon his retirement in 1959.

== Versions ==
- The Monsters and the Critics, and Other Essays (1983). J.R.R. Tolkien and Christopher Tolkien. George Allen and Unwin. ISBN 0-04-809019-0
- ——— (1984) Houghton Mifflin. ISBN 0-395-35635-0
- ——— (1997) HarperCollins. ISBN 0-261-10263-X
