= Sandra Ballif Straubhaar =

Germanic studies scholar (born c. 1951)

- Born: c. 1951
- Occupation: Germanic studies Scholar
- Writing career
- Notable work: Old Norse Women's Poetry: The Voices of Female Skalds

Sandra Ballif Straubhaar is a Germanic studies scholar known for her work on women's poetry in Old Norse, and for her contributions to scholarship on J. R. R. Tolkien's Middle-earth legendarium, in particular his use of Scandinavian medieval literature and lore.

== Biography ==
Sandra Straubhaar obtained her bachelor's degree in German and English at Brigham Young University in 1972. She gained an MA in German at Stanford University in 1975, and then studied Old Norse and modern Icelandic at the University of Iceland until 1978. She obtained her PhD in German Studies and Humanities at Stanford University in 1982.

She held positions as lecturer and assistant professor at Lansing Community College, the University of São Paulo, Michigan State University, and Brigham Young University before moving to the University of Texas at Austin in 1998; she became a distinguished senior lecturer there in 2013.

Straubhaar is well known from her articles on Old Norse women's poetry as well as her popular entry on that subject in the 1993 Medieval Scandinavia: An Encyclopedia.

== Reception ==
=== Old Norse Women's Poetry ===
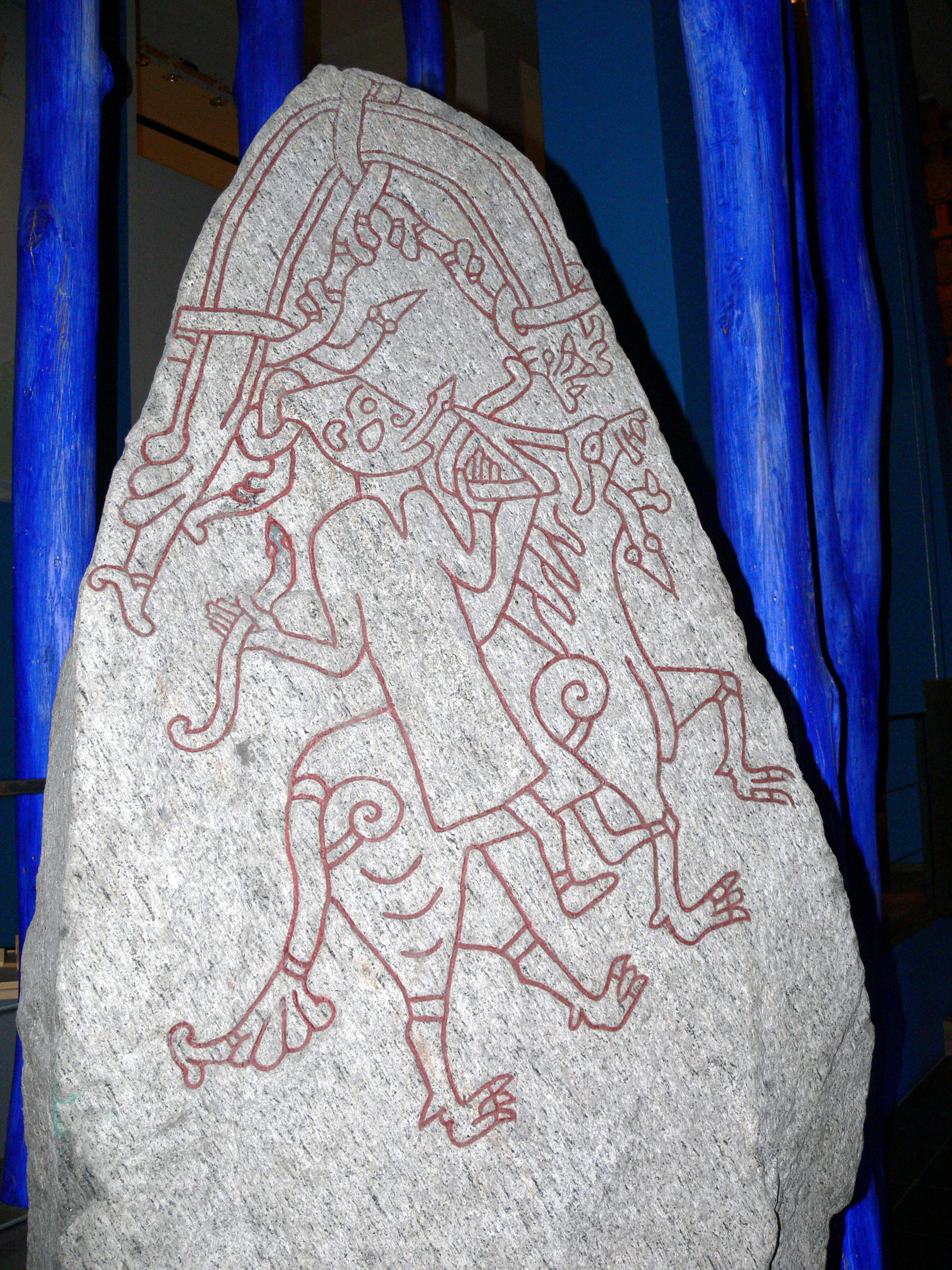
Straubhaar's book presents Old Norse poetry by or about female figures from the real to the magical. Depicted is the giantess Hyrrokkin, riding on a wolf with vipers as reins.

Straubhaar's 2011 book Old Norse Women's Poetry: The Voices of Female Skalds presents the work of Icelandic and Norwegian women poets from the 9th to 13th centuries, in other words starting from the Viking age. Each text is presented in three forms, with the Old Norse poetry, a verse translation, and a somewhat literal prose translation. The skalds covered range from "real people" and the quasi-historical, to dream-verse, legendary heroines, magic-workers and prophetesses, and finally the hostile "trollwomen". The book had a mixed reception among scholars, who noted its problematic definitions of women grading from real to magical.

Catherine Cox, in South Atlantic Review, called the project of assembling the poetry "admirable", but "flawed by inconsistencies and ambiguities" of attribution and definition of what the "voices of female skalds" actually are, given that both real and imagined women are included. In Cox's view, a much sharper analysis of the distinction was required.

Cynthia Hallen, in Rocky Mountain Review, described the book as "a diverse and intriguing database of verse", but comments that neither the verse nor the prose translation actually capture the "word orders, rhetorical figures, skaldic conventions, and the breathless tone of the passage". She liked the "nuggets" of history and cultural insight, but found them too scattered, and the commentaries sometimes too understated. She appreciated the timeline and glossary of names but would have liked approximate dates for the passages.

Kate Heslop, in Speculum, noted that most of the poetry in the book was little known, making the collection "unprecedented". Heslop understood Straubhaar's frustration over unproductive debates about authenticity, but commented that the rich variety of female skaldic verse "demand[s] an engagement with poetic voice as a textual construct; the poetry .. is no less real for being fictional, after all". She called the texts accurate and the translations reliable, barring the "notorious cruces" of Völuspá 22, and found the "unavoidably looser verse rendering" attractive. In contrast, she thought the introduction "too meager" and "a missed chance for a new perspective". She disagreed with Straubhaar's claim that manuscript variation was unimportant, as it was "key to tracing such processes".

Jenny Jochens, in Scandinavian Studies, welcomed "this handsome volume", but wondered why only one of the "women-centered Eddic poems from the Codex Regius" was included. After describing the chapters in detail, Jochens stated that the poetry is not sufficiently set in context, making pleasurable reading difficult and requiring increased work by teachers. She noted that one of her own articles, apparently not known to Straubhaar, gives a more complete survey.

== Awards and distinctions ==
- 2002 Wakonse Fellow
- 2007 Visiting Scholar, Nordisk Institut, Aarhus University
- 2010 Featured Instructor, University of Texas at Austin

== Works ==
Straubhaar has written numerous research articles, encyclopedia entries including eight to the J. R. R. Tolkien Encyclopedia, and book chapters including "Myth, late Roman history, and multiculturalism in Tolkien's Middle-Earth" in Jane Chance's 2004 reader Tolkien and the Invention of Myth. Straubhaar has published the following books:

- 2011 Old Norse Women's Poetry: The Voices of Female Skalds (Boydell and Brewer)
- 2018 Ballads of the North, Medieval to Modern: Essays in Memory of Larry Syndergaard (editor; West Michigan University Press)
