= A Secret Vice =

1931 talk by J. R. R. Tolkien

- 2016 critical edition cover
- Editors: Dimitra Fimi; Andrew Higgins
- Author: J.R.R. Tolkien
- Language: English
- Subjects: Conlanging, Linguistics, Philology
- Published: 7 April 2016
- Publisher: HarperCollins
- Publication place: United Kingdom
- Media type: Hardback
- Pages: 300
- ISBN: 978-0-00-813139-5

"A Secret Vice", also known as "A Hobby for The Home", is a lecture first presented by the English philologist and author J. R. R. Tolkien in 1931. The lecture concerns Tolkien's relations with and view on constructed languages, in particular on artistic languages. In the talk, Tolkien discusses the human desire to make languages, and his criteria to create a good language – these include phonoaesthetics (the beauty of sounds) and the presence of a mythology to accompany the language. Tolkien's presentation was the first instance of him openly exhibiting his hobby of conlanging, and includes examples of several of his languages.

The talk was first published in essay form in 1983, in an anthology of Tolkien's previously unpublished works edited by his son, Christopher. In 2016, an extended edition was published, with material missing from earlier versions, new manuscript material, and a collection of essays concerning Tolkien and constructed languages. This version was edited by Dimitra Fimi and Andrew Higgins, receiving largely positive reviews from both Tolkien scholarship and the fandom.

== Background ==
Tolkien began his interest in conlanging, the art of inventing languages, when he was a teenager; he had previously used Animalic, a language created by his cousins. Tolkien helped to create Nevbosh with a cousin, a code based on English with concepts from French and Latin included. Tolkien's following solo work, Naffarin, was largely drawn from Spanish and Latin. During adolescence, he learnt the international auxiliary language of Esperanto, keeping a notebook in the language.

== Contents ==
Tolkien begins the lecture by clarifying its topic as concerning artistic languages, as compared to international auxiliary languages; he briefly discusses his admiration for Esperanto, and the need for a unifying international language. He then attempts to categorise these languages by their level of complexity. The lower stages of this hierarchy comprise language games; Tolkien writes that this type of language is not art in the same way as more developed ones, and that they are crude in their simple use for secrecy or fun.

To illustrate this, the example of Animalic, a language built solely from animal names, is given. Tolkien argues that the invention of this is an example of the linguistic ability of humans, and that a more developed form of this ability manifests itself in several forms: in polyglotism, poetry, and in conlanging. To show the next stage in his hierarchy, he uses Nevbosh, which showed examples of sound change and alternation, as well as a fledgling appreciation of phonaesthetics. He discusses his joy of language invention, its lack of recognition as an art form, and subsequent lack of publicity by practitioners.

For the next level of development, Tolkien deems a distinction between practicality of communication and pleasure in sound-making as necessary. Examining his own language, Naffarin, a language partly inspired by Nevbosh, Tolkien notes that it has more developed phonetics, moving away from its source languages, and shows his style of conlanging. He states that a successful artistic language requires a constructed mythology among other stipulations, and lists attractions to conlanging: philological experimentation, and grammatical experimentation with the creation of engineered languages. To end, Tolkien gives several examples of his poetry in Quenya and Noldorin, concluding the lecture by likening artistic languages to a form of poetry, and conlangers to poets.

== Publication ==
A Secret Vice was first presented as a lecture to the Samuel Johnson Literary Society at Pembroke College, Oxford on 29 November 1931 at 9pm – it was the first time that Tolkien made his views of language creation and phonoaesthetics public. (Note: Figi and Higgins claim this presentation as Tolkien's first publication of his interest in constructed languages; this is disputed by Goering on the basis that in 1920, Tolkien had read a form of The Fall of Gondolin to an essay club at Exeter College, Oxford.) The manuscript for the talk was later revised for a possible second presentation around twenty years later. (Note: Goering also questions the existence of this second presentation due to a lack of evidence.) Although the original manuscript for the talk gave its name as A Hobby for the Home, the minutes of the Johnson Society record the lecture's name as A Secret Vice – this name was applied to it by Tolkien's son Christopher; Tolkien then used the name.

The essay was first published in print in the 1983 The Monsters and the Critics and Other Essays, which was edited by Christopher. This version omitted material from the original speech, such as a description and glossary of Tolkien's language Fonwegian, (Note: The status of Fonwegian as a creation of Tolkien is disputed; while Higgins argues that it is a creation of Tolkien, scholars such as Goering and Fisher doubt this. For further information, see Languages constructed by J. R. R. Tolkien.) an a posteriori and a priori mix, using grammatical elements from Latin and a phonology from English. This was left out of the 1983 edition because it was written in pencil in the original manuscript, and it was therefore not clear that it was intended to be part of the main lecture.

HarperCollins published a 2016 hardback extended critical edition titled A Secret Vice: Tolkien on Invented Languages edited by Dimitra Fimi and Andrew Higgins. This included the full text of the lecture, as well as several essays, including a previously unpublished "Essay on Phonetic Symbolism" (Note: The previously unpublished essay by Tolkien was much less developed than A Secret Vice, with many points left unsubstantiated. The manuscript was left without a title, so the name "Essay on Phonetic Symbolism" is from the editors of the book; the phrase "Phonetic Symbolism" begins the essay.) on sound and language by Tolkien, and manuscript work related to the lecture. The introduction of the book includes five essays surrounding the lecture and its context, entitled:

1. "Myth-making and Language Invention"
2. "Theorizing Language Invention"
3. "The Languages of Middle-earth"
4. "'A Secret Vice' and Its Immediate Context"
5. "'A Secret Vice' and the Larger Context"

After the introduction, full text, and Tolkien's notes for the lecture, including the original minutes of the Johnson Society meeting, the book concludes with a two-part coda. The first part, The Reception of Tolkien's Invented Languages, discusses the history of the study of Tolkien's languages or "Tolkenian Linguistics". The second, Imaginary Languages for Fiction: Tolkien's Legacy, discusses Tolkien's impact and legacy on artistic languages, looking at languages used in popular media since the publication of The Lord of The Rings. According to Fimi, the critical edition included around 4,500 words of previously unpublished writing by Tolkien.

== Reception ==
The Norwegian linguist and Tolkien scholar Helge Fauskanger wrote: "In 1931, Tolkien wrote an essay about the somewhat peculiar hobby of devising private languages. He called it 'A Secret Vice'. But in Tolkien's case, the 'vice' can hardly be called secret anymore." Fauskanger sees as significant Tolkien's statement in "A Secret Vice" that "The making of language and mythology are related functions", and that "Your language construction will breed a mythology." John Garth wrote that A Secret Vice showed that "language creation, for Tolkien, was an act of gorgeous, individualistic rebellion in an era of barbarous conformity."

Cheryl Cardoza comments that the essay showed Tolkien's "integral relationship between linguistic invention and mythic core" and that "Tolkien’s creation of these categories [of artistic languages] in “A Secret Vice” shed light on the mistakes made by ... other fiction authors." Cardoza views A Secret Vice as containing "a recipe for achieving ... depth" and that it was his application of the set of rules Tolkien outlined in the essay that allowed the realism of Middle-earth.

=== Of the 2016 edition ===
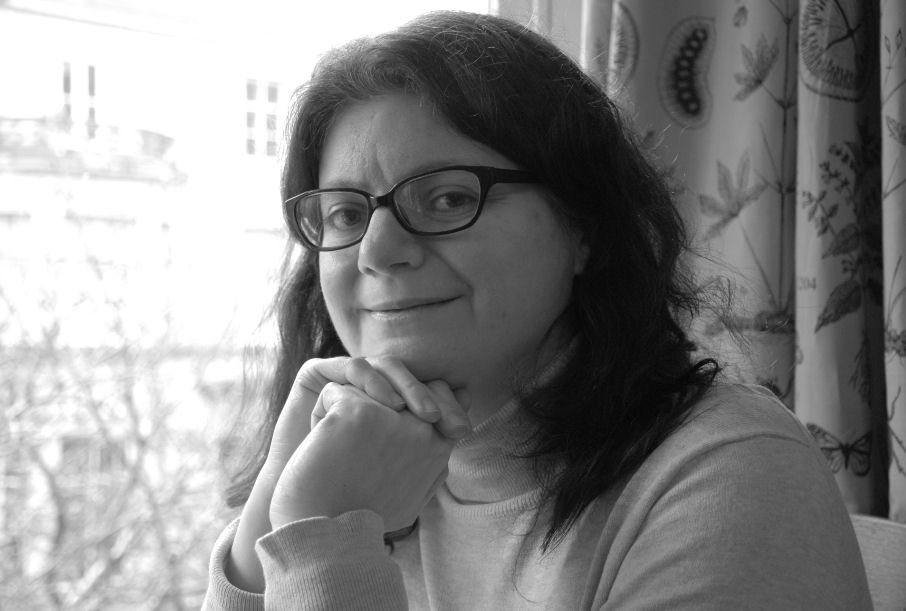
Dimitra Fimi in 2020

A Secret Vice: Tolkien on Invented Languages received largely positive reviews: Nelson Goering praised the editors in the Journal of Tolkien Research for their "excellent job of making clear the dynamic nature of these languages", calling the book "a very significant publication... a largely well-edited and learned presentation of important material by Tolkien."

In Tolkien Studies, Arden R. Smith called the work "a welcome addition to the family of expanded editions of Tolkien's shorter works", praising the editorial essays, but criticised "various infelicities "in the Elvish texts and poetry.

Jason Fisher, in Mythlore, gave a more critical review, writing that the level at which the book was written excluded readers with less thorough knowledge of Tolkien scholarship: "this book is not intended for readers who are new to the subject." Fisher also criticised the lack of an index, omission of Tolkien's annotations for his poem "Olima Markirya", and lack of information surrounding Fonwegian. He additionally disagreed with the scope of the piece with the relative lack of material relating to Tolkien and Esperanto. Despite this, he termed it "a welcome bounty of new material to reckon with and ... an invaluable start".

Garth gave a summary of the book in New Statesman, writing "It’s a mishmash, with something for the Elvish buff and something for those who enjoy unlikely cultural collisions."

Ed Fortune in Starburst magazine gave a positive review, and commented: "Editors Dimitra Fimi and Andrew Higgins have done much to preserve the sense of the work... Those fascinated with Quenya and all things Middle Earth will be especially delighted by this work... this is the definitive work on Tolkien’s relationship with words."

Dennis Wilson Wise viewed the book as an improved "go-to text", praising the "rigorous endnotes" and the "solid contributions being made to the field by this volume". Wise also questioned some of the book's claims as "overstatements", as well as the book's limited area of study, which omitted material on Tolkien's relationship with Esperanto.

== See also ==
- English and Welsh, another lecture by Tolkien discussing language
- Languages constructed by Tolkien
