= Adaptations of The Lord of the Rings =

Many adaptations of The Lord of the Rings, an epic by the English author J. R. R. Tolkien, have been made in the media of film, radio, theatre, video games and recorded readings.

== Motion pictures ==
Early attempts to adapt Tolkien's The Lord of the Rings were made by Walt Disney, William Snyder, Forrest J. Ackerman, Denis O'Dell (who considered Richard Lester to direct, but approached star directors David Lean, Stanley Kubrick and Michaelangelo Antonioni instead), Peter Shaffer, John Boorman and George Lucas. These attempts resulted in some unproduced concept art and scripts and an animated short of The Hobbit.

Three cinema adaptations have been completed. The first was The Lord of the Rings by the American animator Ralph Bakshi in 1978, the first part of what was originally intended to be a two-part adaptation of the story. The second, The Return of the King in 1980, was a television special by Rankin-Bass. The third was The Lord of the Rings film trilogy by the New Zealand director Peter Jackson in the early 2000s, released in three installments as The Fellowship of the Ring, The Two Towers, and The Return of the King.

A Swedish live action television film, Sagan om ringen, inspired by the music album Music Inspired by Lord of the Rings by Bo Hansson was broadcast in 1971. A Finnish live action television miniseries, Hobitit, was broadcast in 1993 based on the events of The Hobbit and The Lord of the Rings. A live-action TV special of The Hobbit was produced in the Soviet Union in 1985, a pilot for an animated Hobbit series in 1991, and a live-action television play of The Fellowship of the Ring, Khraniteli has newly been discovered and uploaded in Russia's Channel 5 YouTube Channel in 2 parts. The adaptation had been aired in Russia once and was thought lost.

== Television ==
From September 2022, Amazon has been presenting a multi-season television series of stories, The Lord of the Rings: The Rings of Power. It is set at the beginning of the Second Age, long before the time of The Lord of the Rings, based on materials in the novel's appendices.

== Radio ==
Tolkien's novel has repeatedly been adapted for radio both in the United States and in Europe, from soon after its publication in the 1950s onwards. In 1955 and 1956, the BBC broadcast The Lord of the Rings, a 12-part radio adaptation of the story. The Fellowship of the Ring was adapted as six 45-minute episodes, then The Two Towers and The Return of the King together were compressed into six 30-minute episodes. Tolkien disparaged this dramatisation, referring to the portrayal of Tom Bombadil as "dreadful" and complaining bitterly about several other aspects. The recordings were lost, but in 2022 the original scripts by the producer Terence Tiller, including a sheet with handwritten suggestions by Tolkien, were rediscovered in the BBC archives.

The New York radio station WBAI-FM broadcast a reading from the book in 1972, narrated by Baird Seales; since then, they have rebroadcast it annually. A 1979 dramatisation was broadcast by National Public Radio in the United States. The series was produced by The Mind's Eye. It was produced by Bob Lewis and adapted for radio by Bernard Mayes.

In 1981, BBC Radio 4 produced a new dramatisation of The Lord of the Rings in 26 half-hour stereo instalments. The script by Brian Sibley and Michael Bakewell attempts to be as faithful as possible to the original novel. It was a critical success and Ian Holm, who voiced Frodo Baggins in the radio serial, went on to play Bilbo Baggins in Peter Jackson's movie trilogy. It also starred Bill Nighy as Sam Gamgee and Michael Hordern as Gandalf.

In 1992 the German radio stations Südwestrundfunk and Westdeutscher Rundfunk broadcast Der Herr der Ringe, a 30-episode adaptation directed by Bernd Lau with music by Peter Zwetkoff. It had a cast including Hans Peter Hallwachs, Walter Renneisen, and Rufus Beck, and was narrated by Ernst Schröder. In 1999-2000 the Danish radio station Danmarks Radio broadcast Eventyret om Ringen, a Danish language retelling by Rune T. Kidde. The music was by The Tolkien Ensemble, Hedningarna, Sorten Muld and Kim Skovbye. In 2001, 2002 and 2003, the three volumes of the novel were adapted into a Slovak radio series, consisting of three annual series of fully cast radio plays, each of six episodes. The Hobbit character Bilbo Baggins served as the narrator. The eighteen episodes were produced and broadcast as a co-production between the public broadcaster Slovak Radio (now Radio and Television Slovakia) and the private broadcaster Rádio Twist (later known as Rádio Viva).

== Stage ==
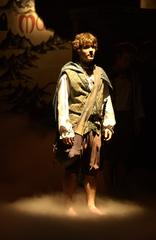
An actor as Frodo Baggins in The Lord of the Rings comedy musical in Cincinnati

Several musical theatre adaptations, whether serious or parodic, have been made based on The Lord of the Rings; they have met with varying success. Full-length productions of each of The Fellowship of the Ring (2001), The Two Towers (2002), and The Return of the King (2003) were staged in Cincinnati, Ohio. Lifeline Theatre in Chicago, Illinois, produced individual plays of each of the three books, with The Fellowship of the Ring in 1997, The Two Towers in 2000, and The Return of the King in 2001. Karen Tarjan and Ned Mochal were involved in adapting and directing the plays, with varying roles.

In 2006, a large-scale three-and-a-half-hour The Lord of the Rings musical was produced in Toronto. The expensive production lost money and closed six months later. It was edited for a production at the Theatre Royal Drury Lane in London, and ran from May 2007 until July 2008; The Guardian wrote that "at £25m, it was the most costly musical mistake in West End history". A shortened version titled The Lord of the Rings: A Musical Tale toured from 2024 to 2025 in the United States, Australia, and Singapore. Further stops were cancelled due to financial constraints in fall 2025.

A musical parody of The Fellowship of the Ring, titled Fellowship!, ran in Los Angeles for a stint on two occasions, coming back 3 years after its debut for a number of shows in the middle of 2009.

English composer Paul Cornfield Godfrey released a full-cast recorded demo of his Lord of the Rings opera in 2025. It is the first of its kind to be approved by the Tolkien Estate.

== Video games ==
Numerous computer and video games have been inspired by J. R. R. Tolkien's works set in Middle-earth. Titles have been produced by studios such as Electronic Arts, Vivendi Games, Melbourne House, and Warner Bros. Interactive Entertainment.

== Board games, card games, and tabletop roleplaying games ==
The Lord of the Rings has been adapted into a variety of board games, card games, and tabletop roleplaying games.

Magic the Gathering released a Universes Beyond set inspired by The Lord of the Rings in 2023. A set inspired by The Hobbit will be released in 2026.

Free League Publishing produces The One Ring Roleplaying Game, in which players can go on various Middle-earth quests. It is set in the period between The Hobbit and The Fellowship of the Ring.

In 2004, Nexus Editrice published the strategic wargame War of the Ring, in which one player controls of the Free Peoples and the other controls Sauron and his Shadow Armies. Lord of the Rings: Fate of the Fellowship is a similarly themed spinoff of the co-operative strategy game Pandemic. It was released in 2025 by Asmodee.

== Readings ==
The Library of Congress, which makes versions especially for the blind, recorded an unabridged version of The Lord of the Rings in 1967, narrated by Livingston Gilbert, on vinyl media. This version was taken out of circulation at the time of the recording of the 1978 version. It recorded a second unabridged version of The Lord of the Rings in 1978, narrated by Norman Barrs, on 4-track tape media. This version was taken out of circulation at the time of the recording of the 1999 version. It recorded a third unabridged version of The Lord of the Rings, A trip to Mordor in 1999, narrated by David Palmer, on 4-track tape media. This version is also available on the new digital players provided for Library of Congress patrons.

In 1990, the Australian actor Rob Inglis read and performed an unabridged version for Recorded Books in their New York studio. While not strictly a dramatisation, Inglis created voices for all the characters, and along with project producer Claudia Howard, he created music for all the songs, which he performed. The project took six weeks to record, not counting preparation time.

In 2021, the British actor Andy Serkis, who played Gollum in Peter Jackson's films, recorded an unabridged version of all three volumes of The Lord of the Rings for HarperCollins and Recorded Books.
