= Rote Erde (TV series) =

West German television series

- Created by: Klaus Emmerich; Peter Stripp (Writer)
- Music by: Irmin Schmidt
- Country of origin: West Germany
- No. of seasons: 2
- No. of episodes: 9 (Red earth) and 4 (Red earth II)

Production
- Running time: 60 minutes (Red Earth); 90 minutes (Red Earth II)

Original release
- Network: Das Erste
- Release: 1983 – 1989

Rote Erde (German for "Red Earth") is a West German television series consisting of 13 episodes (total playing time about 15 hours), the 1983 (first season: Red Earth, 9 parts) and 1989 (second season: Red Earth II, 4 parts), all directed by Klaus Emmerich. The camera was led by Joseph Vilsmaier and Theo Bierkens. The title music was composed by Irmin Schmidt. The German premiere was on (ARD) channel at 23 October 1983. The last episode was screened on 4 March 1990.

The subject of the series is the story of a fictional family of miners in the Ruhr area over a period of about 70 years between the end of the 19th and the mid 20th century, against the background of the history of the German Empire from the Empire to the Weimar Republic to the end of the Nazi dictatorship .

The shooting took place in the studios and on the grounds of the Bavaria-Film am Geiselgasteig near Munich. The elaborately designed exterior backdrops stood until 1996.

In 1984, Peter Stripp (writer), and Klaus Emmerich, received an honorable mention for the series at the Adolf Grimme Award ceremony

== Content ==
=== Red Earth ===
The farmer Bruno Kruska comes, attracted by advertisers, at 17 years of Pomerania in the Ruhr area to work there as a miner on the pit Siegfried. First as a tug, later as a hawker, Bruno finds the work hoped for and witnesses the events surrounding the Siegfried colliery before the turn of the century. He marries Pauline, the daughter of the miner Friedrich Bötzkes. His son Karl developed into a Social Democrat in the imperial era, overran his father and leaves the family. He becomes union official and finally member of the Reichstag, Bruno is critical of the activities of the Social Democrats and can not be taken. He is drafted into the First World War, but is called back from the front for mining.

Bruno's wife Pauline sympathizes with the Social Democrats and the Spartacists during the war, which Bruno does not really support, but does not refuse. At the end of this first part of the saga, the emperor abdicated and the miners, among them Bruno and his friend, the miner Otto Schablowski, occupy the mine and demand their nationalization. That they could not prevail with this is only hinted at in the cinematic presentation.

=== Red Earth II ===
Max Kruska, son of Bruno Kruska, experiences the depression and - also his own - unemployment after the First World War. The Siegfried colliery is occupied by Frenchmen and the coal mining primarily serves the reparation. Max is impressed by the promises of the National Socialists and Adolf Hitler and enters the NSDAP. At the colliery, where Max could invest again, the progress has arrived. But Max's doubts come from National Socialist Germany; When his uncle Karl and his brother-in-law Richard are imprisoned, he turns away from the formerly supported policy. From then on he supports the forced laborers who are under him underground and hopes the war will end soon. But the assassination of a young Russian forced laborer at the mine, which Max has witnessed, further intensifies his anger towards the regime. After all, Max, together with his brother-in-law Richard, who has since been released from custody, prevents the Siegfried colliery from being destroyed by the Wehrmacht at the end of the war.

The story ends with the colliery being shut down a few years later for economic reasons and the winding tower blown up.

== Episodes ==
Season 1: Red Earth (first broadcast in 1983)

- Episode 1: The First Layer: Buried Alive (1887)
- Episode 2: Battle for survival (1889)
- Episode 3: In the blind shaft (1889-1890)
- Episode 4: Bruno and Pauline (1893-1894)
- Episode 5: The Pit Burns (1899)
- Episode 6: The candidates (1912)
- Episode 7: Thirty pfennigs more (1912)
- Episode 8: For Emperor and Fatherland (1914-1918)
- Episode 9: Five Days and Five Nights (1919)

Season 2: Red Earth II (first broadcast in 1990)

- Episode 1: French grove
- Episode 2: Heil Hitler or luck on
- Episode 3: Coal for the final victory
- Episode 4: Who owns the Pütt?

== Cast ==
=== Main cast ===
- Bruno Kruska (Claude-Oliver Rudolph) - a 17-year-old son of Pomeranian farmers in the Ruhr area. Starts working as a miner in the pit 'Siegfried'. He and fellow miner, Friedrich Boetzkes get trapped, but both are safely rescued after hours of work. He calls for an improvement in working conditions and reluctantly supports the other mates' strikes. He sees in a common interest group of all coal miners in the district (union) an easy target for the employers' associations, which is why the workers should organize himself in his opinion, only in their own company. His friend Herbert Boetzkes is shot by Steiger Bärwald during the strike, Bruno gets revenge on Steiger, later to overthrow and kill him. Later his military service, he marries Pauline Botzkes, causing problems, since he himself is Protestant, while Pauline is Catholic. Later they have a son 'Max' and a daughter 'Franziska'. He gets a position as an elected shop steward. He has a near death experience as he hits a gas bubble with a jackhammer while coal cutting. After World War I, he returns to mining which is operated by the military. In the 2nd season, he is in the infirmary of the mine to cure his lung cancer. His friend Otto died, he had to identify the copse. He claims to have lied to his son and the other buddies that his corpse was not his best friend's. He gets caught in a mine accident and is buried. His son Max and his friend Jupp Kowalla rescue him, but he dies due to his injuries. His funeral procession is abruptly interrupted as a demonstration march of anti-fascist action by members of the Sturmabteilung under the leadership of Revier Martin Stanek.
- Otto Schablowski (Ralf Richter) - son of Pomeranian farmers, but has been working as a miner for some time. He becomes Bruno's best friend and teaches to be a miner. He is one of the spokesmen during the strike. When the families run out of money to buy food during the strike, Otto gives away his accumulated savings so that the strike does not stop. He protects a worker from an overseer by slapping him, he is sent to jail but breaks out and hides with Erna Stanek. After a pitfire, he is imprisoned again and stays for the rest of his sentence. In the 2nd season, Otto strictly rejects having to mine coal for the French. He steals dynamite to destroy a French ammunition depot, but dies in the attempt.
- Friedrich Boetzkes (Horst Ch. Beckmann) - a veteran and very experienced miner. He mourns the days before the Industrial Revolution, when the miners were still a respected profession and were not cheap workers of large corporations. He is married to the much younger Käthe and they have a son Klaus. His sons Karl, Herbert and Willi, as well as his daughters Pauline and Friedel, all came from his first marriage. He rejects the other miners' strike and goes to work every day. Bruno marries his daughter Pauline and Willi later dies during the pit fire. He suffers from rheumatism, only a small compensation from the miners. He dies in 1912.
- Karl Boetzkes (Dominic Raacke) - Friedrich's eldest son and also a miner. He is a social democrat, advocates workers' rights and tries to mobilize the others. He rejects the strikes and is a member of a delegation to represent the interests of workers in Berlin, as a union official in nearby Dortmund. He goes through various political strifes but when he supports Rewandowski during the war according to the attitude of his party, instead of campaigning for peace, he loses all the consent of his constituents. In the 2nd season, (now played by Alexander Wagner), he calls for increased cooperation of workers and mine operators to tackle together against the unjust coal claims of the French. Although, since the end of the war, he has increasingly lost his reputation with his old mining buddies, because they feel neglected by him and see their interests are no longer perceived. Later, Richard tells that Karl died in the Bergen-Belsen concentration camp, after he was imprisoned with Richard Brosch.
- Alfred Rewandowski (Walter Renneisen) - the nephew of the mine owner, later he takes over the control of the mine. He has little interest in the demands of his workers, but he is very worried about accidents. He has a short relationship with Käthe Boetzkes, before he gets married and has a son. This marriage gives him the control of a steel company that is growing enormously with products for the defense industry before and during the World War. To make himself popular with the workforce and to secure voters, he even feigns sympathy during Friedrich's funeral and modernizes the technology underground. In the 2nd season, he wants to keep his business under his own control and always rejects the interference of the Nazi state. After they seizure of power, he wrote a circular to other entrepreneurs with the demand not to cooperate with the Nazis and to stop coal mining. He later commits suicide after his son Fritz becomes a member of the NSDAP.
- Erna Stanek (Karin Neuhäuser) - lives together with her sons Martin and Hannes in the settlement of the Siegfried colliery. She is a mining widow, so she often accommodates sleepers. She occasionally is a prostitute, one of her most frequent customers is Otto. Also Bruno visited her, she has a stillbirth and did not know if the father was Bruno or Otto. Later she takes with Vladislaus, A Polish-born boy who does not go to war because of his age. She becomes a Social Democratic spokesman. Her sons move into a dormitory, as they do not want to live with Vladislaus for nationalist reasons. Erna is deeply disturbed by her sons actions, yet she mourns Hannes's death during the war. Martin does not see her again until the end of the war, when he is supposed to recapture the mine together with other soldiers.
- Max Kruska (Hansa Czypionka) - son of Bruno Kruska and his wife Pauline and was born in 1899 on the site of the mine Siegfried. During the war he becomes a delivery driver, then miner. He befriends the prisoner of war Maurice, who is later to be accused of being a saboteur. Max becomes Käthe's lover even after the war. Because of the personal hardships, Max tries to assassinate Emperor Wilhelm II with a molotov cocktail but is stopped by Bruno. After the war, Max makes friends with Fritz Rewandwoski, who saved his life ages ago, but the friendship does not last.

In the 2nd season, he is long-time unemployed and has a brief affair with Charlotte. fathering an illegitimate son, who is called Olaf who he calls 'Olli'. Charlotte marries a much older Jewish laundry owner and Max rarely sees his son. He becomes a member of the NSDAP and often wears an SA uniform. He provokes repeatedly Charlotte's Jewish husband and later he marries Sofie, Richard Brosch's sister, and has more children with her. He later loses his National Socialist idealism, after seeing a young Russian peasant hanged for stealing food. He later meets again Jupp, who now works as a translator of the British. Together with Fränzi, Sofie, Jupp and Richard, Max witnessed the demolition of the winding tower of the Siegfried colliery in the late 1950s.

- Richard Brosch (Max Herbrechter) - He is not a miner, but works in a nearby ironworks, he also creates social democratic posters as a painter. Fränzi Kruska becomes his model. He later married her after she gave birth to a son Georg-Vladimir (named after Lenin). Richardis very active politically and worked in the works council. After the introduction of the Enabling Act and the prohibition of other parties, he is detained by the Sturmabteilung. In detention, he meets Karl and together they want to unite the implacable Social Democrats and Communists, they are freed by Jupp Kowalla. Due to their convictions and they voluntarily return to prison, but they are taken to a concentration camp. During the war, the mine is short of workers, so Max operation leader persuades Stanek to apply for the freedom of his brother. He is freed after 10 years in prison but also witnesses the execution of a Soviet forced laborer. He and Max as members of the Volkssturm prevent Stanek from blowing up the mine tower and the entrance to the mine. After the war, Richard becomes one of the lead social democrats and trade unionists in the region and is very committed to democratization. He rejects the Communists strikes and argues with Jupp, he prefers a political and democratic solution. He neglects his wife Fränzi, who re-friends Jupp. In the late 1950s, Richard is along with Sofie, Fränzi, Max and Jupp Witness to the economic demolition of the winding tower of the Siegfried colliery.
- Jupp Kowalla (Klaus J. Behrendt) - A miner and works in the same shift as Max and Bruno. He is not a social democrat, but a convinced Communist and strives for the dictatorship of the proletariat. Although he is friends with Max, they are in politically hostile camps. Jupp is interested in Fränzi and possibly is the father of her son Georg-Vladimir. On the day of the imprisonments, leftist Jupp recognizes the danger and tries to convince Richard to flee with him. However, Richard continues on his way and is taken by the waiting SA men in "protective custody". Max steals Jupp, a SA uniform and the badge of concern Obersturmbannführer. With some of his comrades, he invades the prison, which is an occupied school, and demands the movement of Richard, Karl and several other detainees to "interrogate them elsewhere." The plan seems to begin first, until the squad leader receives a call and sounds the alarm, Jupp and the others flee with a truck. His plan to flee to Belgium, Richard and Karl do not go. So the fugitives leave the two in a forest. Jupp manages to go to Belgium, from where he makes it to England. After the war, he returns to the Siegfried colliery as a translator of the British and meets his old friends. Jupp accuses Max to still be a Nazi himself. Jupp clearly appeals also to cooperate with the Soviet occupation zone and to prevent a split-off. He remains in the settlement after his translation work and moves in with Fränzi. In the anti-communist era under Konrad Adenauer, he is politically oppressed again and is dismissed at Stanek's intervention as a (elected by the workers) member of the works council. In the 1950s, he sees together with Richard, Max, Fränzi and Sofie in the economic demolition of the winding tower.
- Martin Stanek (Thomas Wolff) - He is the elder son of Erna Stanek and lives together with his younger brother Hannes with his mother. The two violent brothers abduct, the gendarmes who look for Otto, who has hidden during his sickness and is almost frostbitten at Erna's house. As young adults, they use racist remarks and violence as they beat up the young Max who distributes leaflets on the occasion of his uncle's candidacy, or try to rape Friedel, which fails by the accidental passing of two gendarmes. Later, both voluntarily go to war, Hannes is killed, while Erna hears nothing from Martin for a long time. Later, Martin is one of the soldiers recapturing the mine. In the 1920s, he works as a Reviersteiger and is already at this time an active member of the NSDAP. Stanek becomes as Sturmbannführer and is used as operator. He also becomes the new husband of Charlotte after she had parted company with her Jewish husband and becomes the stepfather of Max's illegitimate son Olaf. He treats the Soviet forced laborers like 'subhumans' and complains to Max that he lacks good workers. During an air raid, a young forced laborer seizes the opportunity to steal something edible in a bombed-out bakery and gets caught. Stanek has him executed on the colliery. Also, a second, old Russian is shot because he wanted to help the boy. These acts cause Max to hate him. At the end of the war, he wants to flee the approaching Allies and wants to "just leave scorched earth" by blowing up the pit and pit, but Max and Richard stop him and guard the pit as Volkssturm men. He later caught, arrested and tried after the war because of his offenses against the forced laborers. He receives a mild sentence of just three years on probation. Later, Stanek again becomes manager of the mine and among other things ensures that the communist Jupp is dismissed from the works council. He later continues to fight with Max.

=== Other cast members ===
First season

- Claude-Oliver Rudolph : Bruno Kruska
- Ralf Richter : Otto Schablowski
- Karin Neuhäuser : Erna Stanek
- Horst-Christian Beckmann : Friedrich Boetzkes
- Angelika Bartsch : Kathe Boetzkes
- Dominic Raacke : Karl Boetzkes
- Vera Lippisch : Pauline Boetzkes
- Mira Gittner : Friedel Boetzkes (part 1 to 3)
- Patricia von Miserony : Friedel Boetzkes (from Part 4)
- Dieter Brandecker : Herbert Boetzkes
- Walter Renneisen : Alfred Rewandowski
- Uwe Fellensiek : Heinz Kowalski
- Sunnyi Melles : Sylvia von Kampen
- Klaus Wennemann : Operations Manager
- Jörg Hube : Kaplan
- Albert Heins : Steiger Bärwald
- Werner Eichhorn : Walter
- Rudolf Schündler : Hermann Rewandowski
- Dominique Horwitz : Rudi Schickert
- Wolfgang Flatz : Vladislaus
- Edwin Marian : Steiger Kowiak
- Rüdiger Kuhlbrodt : Steiger Wernicke
- Danny Ashkenasi : Max Kruska (Part 6 and 7)
- Martin Walz : Max Kruska (Part 8 and 9)
- Jens Uhrbach : Martin Stanek (part 6 to 9)
- Axel Uhrbach : Hannes Stanek (part 6 to 8)
- Wolfram Haack : Fritz Rewandowski (Part 8 and 9)
- Roger Souza : Maurice
- Joachim Höppner : Gendarme

Second season

- Hansa Czypionka : Max Kruska
- Nina Petri : Fränzi Kruska
- Margarita Broich : Sofie Kruska
- Renate Becker : Pauline Kruska
- Klaus J. Behrendt : Jupp Kowalla
- Max Herbrechter : Richard Brosch
- Thomas Wolff : Martin Stanek
- Alexander Wagner : Karl Boetzkes
- Tomma Wember : Charlotte
- Dorothea Senz : Ingrid
- Michael Brandner : Dicker
- Walter Renneisen : Alfred Rewandowski
- Sylvester Groth : Fritz Rewandowski
- Ingo Naujoks : Hannes
- Jochen Nickel : Helmut
- Wolfgang Schneider : Heinrich
- Jürgen Schornagel : Mr. Scherbaum
- Marianne Zilles : Mrs. Scherbaum
- Claude-Oliver Rudolph : Bruno Kruska
- Ralf Richter : Otto Schablowski
- Armin Rohde : SA man

== Locations ==
During the entire course of action, no concrete place of action is mentioned. Since the Ruhr area only half belonged to Westphalia administratively (as the title 'Rote Erde' indicates), the Siegfried colliery must be located in the northeastern district. The chaplain comments on his sentencing to Werden as saying that he should "get as far away as possible", which confirms this somewhat.

In episode 2, on the occasion of the election of the strike delegates, instead of fictional mines ("Hermine II", "Cäcilie", "Karl August", etc.) real mines are mentioned: "Wilhelmine Viktoria", and "Count Bismarck" are located in Gelsenkirchen, " Bonifacius " in Essen. In the second season, a few statements and signs indicate where the colliery is located: The inhabitants see and hear the explosion of the ammunition depot that Otto blew up, which according to Max is located in Haßlinghausen. Later, a sister of the Caritas Hattingen office (as it says on her coach) delivers laundry and hidden communist leaflets to the Kruska family from. Together with Rewandowski's statement that the Siegfried colliery is already more than 100 years old (at the beginning of the 19th century the Ruhr mining industry concentrated on the last mentioned cities), the area of today's Ennepe-Ruhr district appears to be the most likely place of action. On a sign at the restaurant is a beer brewery from Dortmund to read. The newspaper, which is read by Friedrich Boetzkes, is called 'Tremonia', which is the Latin name for the city of Dortmund.

The constituency winner of the 1912 Reichstag election, Karl Boetzkes, is indeed a fictional character, but has a similar life as the actual Wahlkreissieger (election district winner) Max King (about the life data, the craft work at a young age and the rise to the trade unionist). This won the mandate in the constituency Hagen - Schwelm - Witten, which includes the mentioned localities. The only other constituency winner of the SPD in the Ruhr area was that year the dentist and writer August Erdmann in the constituency of Dortmund - Hörde .

The conveyor tower in the first season has a clear similarity to an early photograph of the Hibernia colliery from the 1850s, as it is printed in the WAZ Chronicle of the Ruhr (1987). Such scaffolding was around 1887, when the action of the series begins, of course, long outdated and almost nowhere in use.

== Other notes ==
Based on the TV series, the director Volker Lösch staged a play by the same name at the Schauspiel Essen 2012 .

== Literature ==
- Tita Gaehme, Karin Graf (ed.): Red Earth - Miners' Life 1870-1920: Film, Exhibition, Reality. Prometh Verlag, Cologne 1983, ISBN 3-922009-59-X
- Peter Stripp : Red Earth. The novel for the TV series. Droemer Knaur 1983, ISBN 3-426-01068-2
- Peter Stripp: Red Earth. Family saga from the Ruhr area. Henselowsky Boschmann 2008, ISBN 9783922750888

== See also ==
- List of German television series
