= Der Herr der Ringe =

German radio play of the lord of the rings

Der Herr der Ringe (The Lord of the Rings)
- Genre: Radio drama
- Running time: 25 minutes per episode
- Country of origin: Germany
- Language: German
- Home station: Südwestrundfunk / Westdeutscher Rundfunk
- Starring: Matthias Haase; Manfred Steffen; Hans Peter Hallwachs; Edgar Hoppe; Gustl Halenke; Walter Renneisen; Rufus Beck; Tobias Lelle; Matthias Ponnier
- Created by: John R. R. Tolkien
- Written by: Peter F. Steinbach
- Directed by: Bernd Lau
- Narrated by: Ernst Schröder
- Original release: January 1992 – March 1992
- No. of episodes: 30

Der Herr der Ringe was a German language radio adaptation of J.R.R. Tolkien's The Lord of the Rings broadcast on the German radio stations Südwestrundfunk and Westdeutscher Rundfunk between September 1991 and March 1992. At thirty half-hour episodes, and a speaking cast of around 96 actors, it was a landmark achievement in German audio drama.

== Episode list ==
Episode	German Title	English Translation
1	Ein festlicher Abschied	A Festive Farewell
2	Der Ring bleibt bei Frodo	The Ring Remains with Frodo
3	Der Feind regt sich	The Enemy Stirs
4	Hinaus in die Welt	Out into the World
5	Eine Nacht unter Elben	A Night amongst the Elves
6	Verschwörung der Freunde	Conspiracy of Friends
7	Süße Gastfreundschaft	Sweet Hospitality
8	Ein Waldläufer kommt ins Spiel	A Ranger Enters
9	Der Feind greift an	The Enemy Attacks
10	Der Rat Elronds	The Council of Elrond
11	In die Tiefen der Welt	In the Deep of the World
12	Durins Zeiten	The Time of Durin
13	Im Herzen des alten Reiches	In the Heart of the Old Kingdom
14	Frodos Entscheidung	Frodo's Decision
15	Die Gemeinschaft zerbricht	The Fellowship Breaks
16	Mit Horn und Trommeln	With Horn and Drum
17	Neue Ziele	New Aims
18	Ein Heer bricht auf	An Army Departs
19	Kampf um die Hornburg	Battle for the Hornburg
20	Nach Isengart	To Isengard
21	Sarumans Stimme	Saruman's Voice
22	Eine Falle für alle Hobbits	A Trap for All Hobbits
23	Der Feind vor der Stadt	The Enemy at the Gates
24	Zum Tor der Toten	At the Door of the Dead
25	Die Verbündeten sammeln sich	The Allies Gather
26	Feuer in der Stadt	Fire in the City
27	Der Tod des Königs	The Death of the King
28	Ein Köder für Mordor	Bait for Mordor
29	Am Schicksalsberg	At the Mountain of Destiny
30	Zu guter Letzt	At Long Last

== Cast ==
Character	English name	Actor
Erzähler	Narrator	Ernst Schröder
Frodo Beutlin	Frodo Baggins	Matthias Haase
Gandalf	Gandalf	Manfred Steffen
Aragorn	Aragorn	Hans Peter Hallwachs
Samweis Gamdschie (Sam)	Samwise Gamgee (Sam)	Edgar Hoppe
Galadriel	Galadriel	Gustl Halenke
Peregrin Tuk (Pippin)	Peregrin Took (Pippin)	Rufus Beck
Meriadoc Brandybock (Merry)	Meriadoc Brandybuck	Tobias Lelle
Legolas	Legolas	Matthias Ponnier
Gimli	Gimli	Walter Renneisen
Haldir	Haldir	Gunther Cremer
Boromir	Boromir	Christian Redl
Bilbo Beutlin	Bilbo Baggins	Klaus Herm
Saruman	Saruman	Manfred Steffen
Tom Bombadil	Tom Bombadil	Peter Ehrlich
Bauer Maggot	Farmer Maggot	Günter Kasch
Alter Eichler	Old Noakes	Walter Laugwitz
Grima Schlangenzunge	Grima Wormtongue	Karl Lieffen
Éomer	Éomer	Rainer Schmitt
Denethor II.	Denethor II	Heinz Schimmelpfennig
Éowyn	Éowyn	Donata Höffer
Faramir	Faramir	Friedhelm Ptok
Háma	Háma	Dieter Eppler
Baumbart	Treebeard	Friedrich Schütter
Fürst der Nazgûl	Lord of the Nazgûl	Christian Mey
Celeborn	Celeborn	Wolfgang Hinze
Théoden	Théoden	Werner Rundshagen
Gollum / Sméagol	Gollum / Sméagol	Dietmar Mues
Ohm Gamdschie	Gaffer Gamgee	Wolfgang Reinsch
Timm Sandigmann	Ted Sandyman	Jochen Stern
Saurons Mund	The Mouth of Sauron	Peter Gawajda
Goldbeere	Goldberry	Donata Höffer
Glorfindel	Glorfindel	Stephan Schwartz
Imrahil	Imrahil	Gert Andresen
Beregond	Beregond	Klaus Spürkel
Glóin	Glóin	Heinz Meier
Gildor	Gildor	Charles Wirths
Väterchen Zwiefuß	Daddy Two-foot	Hans Edgar Stecher
