= Translation of The Lord of the Rings into Swedish =

Controversial translation of "Lord of the Rings" into Swedish

The first edition covers of the three volumes of Härskarringen with Åke Ohlmarks's controversial 1959–1961 translation of The Lord of the Rings, the only one to be available in Swedish for 40 years

The translation of The Lord of the Rings into Swedish has been the subject of controversy. The first version (Swedish title: Sagan om ringen, "The Tale of the Ring"), by Åke Ohlmarks, done in 1959–1961, was the only one available in Swedish for forty years. The book's author, J. R. R. Tolkien, took issue with Ohlmarks's translation, identifying numerous errors and inconsistencies. In response to Ohlmarks and to Max Schuchart's Dutch translation, Tolkien wrote a "Guide to the Names in The Lord of the Rings", a framework for translating personal names and place names; it gives multiple examples from Ohlmarks's text of what not to do. Ohlmarks rejected all criticism, stating that he had intentionally created an interpretation of Tolkien, not a straight translation. Swedish commentators took a wide range of positions on Ohlmarks's version: some admired it, others did not.

Ohlmarks's version was superseded in 2005 by Erik Andersson's more direct translation of the prose, with Lotta Olsson's rendering of the embedded poetry. Andersson followed Tolkien's framework for translating names. He kept some of Ohlmarks's choices, such as Vidstige for Strider and Fylke for the Shire, on the grounds that they were well established and did not contradict Tolkien’s wishes. The 2005 version attracted great interest in Sweden, and was on the whole well received.

== Åke Ohlmarks 1959–1961 ==
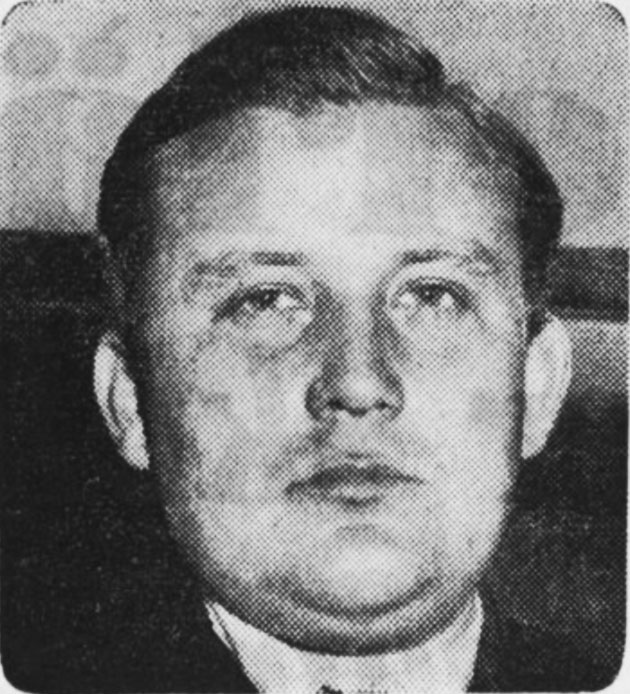
Åke Ohlmarks in 1938

Åke Ohlmarks (1911–1984) was a philologist and prolific translator who published Swedish versions of Shakespeare, Dante and the Quran. His translation of The Lord of the Rings was the only one available in Swedish for forty years. He ignored complaints and calls for revision from readers, stating in his 1978 book Tolkiens arv ("Tolkien's legacy") that his intention had been to create an interpretation, not a translation. (Note: Charlotte Strömbom wrote: Nej, Ohlmarks strävar helt enkelt inte efter att vara Tolkien så trogen så möjligt; hans ideal måste vara ett annat. Ty genom att brodera ut Tolkiens text, att lägga till ord och ägna sig åt långa omskrivningar, att helt enkelt träget göra om det enkla språket till ett mer komplicerat och högtravande sådant, förändras inte bara meningsbyggnad och ordföljd; även stilen blir en annan. (No, Ohlmarks is simply not aiming to be as faithful to Tolkien as possible; his ideal has to be different. For by embroidering Tolkien's text, adding words and indulging in lengthy paraphrases, by frankly stubbornly turning the simple language into a more complicated and high-faluting one, not only are the structure of sentences and word order changed; the style too becomes different.))

The translation had its merits. Ohlmarks's experience translating Old Norse enabled him to find suitable old Swedish words for some of Tolkien's terms: Tolkien scholar Anders Stenström (pen name Beregond) praises his choices of alv for "elf", and of väströna (modelled on norröna, "Norse") for "Westron". On the other hand, Beregond notes, Ohlmarks failed to use harg for the cognate "harrow" in Dunharrow, or skog for "shaw" in Trollshaws, things that "should have been obvious". A much more widespread issue was Ohlmarks's "propensity for embroidering every description". When Tolkien calls Bilbo's wealth "a legend"; Ohlmarks goes beyond Tolkien's text to assert that "his travels are sägenomsusade ('legendary') as well."

When The Silmarillion was published in 1977, Tolkien's son and literary executor Christopher Tolkien consented to a Swedish translation only on the condition that Ohlmarks have nothing to do with it. The translation was done by Roland Adlerberth.

Ohlmarks went on to write a book in 1982 called Tolkien and Black Magic.

=== Tolkien's response ===
Tolkien intensely disliked Ohlmarks and his translation of The Lord of the Rings. (Note: Carpenter 2023, #228 to Allen & Unwin, 24 January 1961: "Ohlmarks is a very vain man (as I discovered in our correspondence), preferring his own fancy to facts, and very ready to pretend to knowledge which he does not possess.") (Note: Carpenter 2023, #229 to Allen & Unwin, 23 February 1961: "I now enclose a copy and version of Ohlmarks' nonsense [about Tolkien]. In the hope that you may think it justifies my annoyance. I have not looked at his second outburst. I feel I cannot just now take any more.") He thought Ohlmarks's version was even worse than Schuchart's 1956–57 Dutch translation, as is evident from a 1957 letter to his publisher Rayner Unwin: (Note: Carpenter 2023, #263 to Rayner Unwin, 1957)

The enclosure that you brought from Almqvist &c. was both puzzling and irritating. A letter in Swedish from fil. dr. Åke Ohlmarks, and a huge list (9 pages foolscap) of names in the L.R. which he had altered. I hope that my inadequate knowledge of Swedish – no better than my kn. of Dutch, but I possess a v. much better Dutch dictionary! – tends to exaggerate the impression I received. The impression remains, nonetheless, that Dr. Ohlmarks is a conceited person, less competent than charming Max Schuchart, though he thinks much better of himself.

Examples singled out by Tolkien in the same letter include:

Tolkien's response to Ohlmarks' renderings of names
Tolkien	Ohlmarks	Literally	Tolkien's comments	Notes on etymology
Ford of Bruinen	Björnavad	Bear Ford	"!"	A guess, using English "Bruin", a brown bear; Sindarin brui, "noisy"; nen, "water"
Archet	Gamleby	Old Village	"a mere guess, I suppose, from 'archaic'?"	British *ar(e)cait, "near the woods"; compare Welsh argoed, "trees" (Note: Tolkien 1975, p. 178)
Mountains of Lune (Ered Luin)	Månbergen	Moon Mountains	———	A guess, using Latin luna, moon Ered Luin is Sindarin: "Blue Mountains"
Gladden Fields	Ljusa slätterna	Bright Plains	"(in spite of descr[iption] in [Book] I. 62)"	Gladden = Yellow iris (Note: Tolkien 1975, pp. 185–186)

In his 1967 "Guide to the Names in The Lord of the Rings", produced in response to Ohlmarks' version, Tolkien pointed out numerous other translations that he found dubious. For example, Ohlmarks used Vattnadal ("Water-dale") for Rivendell, apparently, Tolkien commented, by way of taking riven for river. (Note: Tolkien 1975, p. 190) The Ent Quickbeam becomes Snabba solstrålen ("Swift Sunbeam"), apparently taking beam in the sense of "beam of light" instead of "tree", ignoring the fact that all Ents have names connected with trees. Tolkien stated that Quickbeam was so named because he was a "hasty" Ent; Tolkien advises translating the name to give the sense "quick (lively) tree", noting that both "Quickbeam" and "Quicken" are actual English names for the rowan tree. (Note: Tolkien 1975, p. 172)

Ohlmarks sometimes offers multiple translations for names: for example, he renders Isengard variously as Isengard, Isengård, Isendor or Isendal. The "Guide to the Names in The Lord of the Rings" states that this name was meant to be so "archaic in form" that its etymology had been forgotten. Tolkien advises that it could be used either as it was or, for Germanic languages (like Swedish), "one or both elements in [the] name" could be translated using "related elements" in those languages, mentioning gård as an option. (Note: Tolkien 1975, pp. 187–188)

=== Reception in Sweden ===
==== Early welcome ====
Some of the initial reception was warm; author and translator Sven Stolpe wrote in Aftonbladet that Ohlmarks "has made a ’swedification’ [försvenskning] – he has found wonderful, magnificent, Swedish compound words, he has translated poem after poem with great inspiration, there is not a page in his magnum opus that does not read like original Swedish work by a brilliant poet". Staffan Björck, reviewing the book for Dagens Nyheter, listed some objections but wrote that "I only list these objections so that I can with greater emphasis praise the translation as a whole: it is magnificent."

==== Later hostility ====
Later, the translation's reception became more hostile. In 2000, Leif Jacobsen of Lund University's Institute of Linguistics noted among other things Ohlmarks’s confusion/conflation of Éowyn and Merry in the Battle of the Pelennor Fields, and wrote that "There can be no doubt that the Swedish translation is defective and in many ways a failure". He argued that whereas Tolkien was writing for adults, Ohlmarks translated for children; and that Ohlmarks tried to make the text his own, supplanting Tolkien rather than directly translating him.

In 2004, Malte Persson wrote in Göteborgsposten that the translation was "so full of misunderstandings, misconceptions, inconsistencies, and arbitrary additions that it must mean that Ohlmarks was either significantly worse at English than Icelandic, or that he had not taken the assignment seriously".

Also in 2004, Tolkien scholar Anders Stenström (pen name Beregond) wrote that Ohlmarks’s translation contains numerous factual errors, mistranslations of idiomatic expressions, and non-sequiturs.

Andreas Brunner commented in Sydsvenska Dagbladet that Ohlmarks' prose is hyperbolic in style, where the original uses simple or even laconic language.

== Erik Andersson and Lotta Olsson, 2005 ==
=== Approach ===
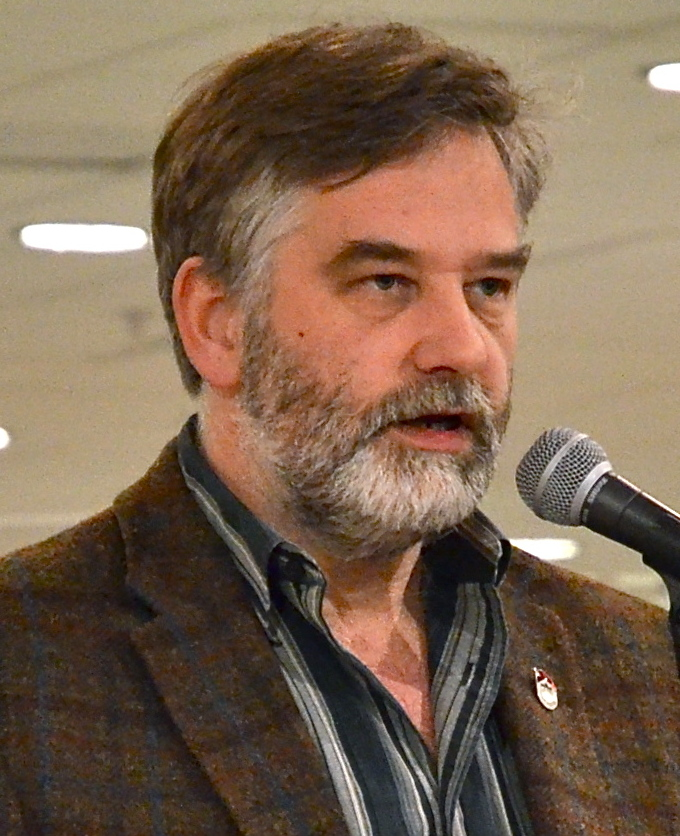
Erik Andersson in 2012

Ohlmarks's translation was not superseded until 2005, when a new translation was made by Erik Andersson, with poems interpreted by Lotta Olsson. This translation was by intention much closer to the original, hewing to Tolkien's instructions. In the translation process, Andersson had access to a team of Tolkien fans as advisors. In 2007, he published a book called Översättarens anmärkningar ("The Translator's Notes") based on his diaries from the project.

Andersson retained some of Ohlmarks's more popular and well-established choices, such as Vidstige (roughly ”Wide-walker”) for "Strider", Midgård for Middle-earth and Fylke for the Shire. Stefan Spjut, reviewing the new translation in Svenska Dagbladet, commented that Ohlmarks's version had its merits, and that his Vidstige "even outdoes the original’s Strider", but that people would probably get used to the new version.

=== Reception ===
The 2005 translation project attracted great interest from Swedish Tolkien fans and Swedish media. Henrik Williams, reviewing the new translation for Dagens Nyheter, wrote: "Let me say that Andersson & Olsson have prepared a readable, even and in large part correct translation, a test of a very robust piece of work that deserves deep respect, but also a careful review". Malte Persson wrote in Göteborgsposten that "the new translation follows the original's fluent prose very closely, and only a linguistic pedant could find anything to object to".

== Comparisons ==
=== Titles ===
Charlotte Strömbom notes that the Swedish titles chosen for the books immediately indicate differences between Andersson and Ohlmarks. Andersson’s title for the trilogy is, she writes, plainly closer to Tolkien's in both meaning and form; Ohlmarks' title shifts attention to the Ring itself. Ohlmarks omits the "Fellowship" from Volume I, giving what Strömbom suggests is a more epic feeling to the title, where Andersson's is more grounded in reality.

Titles
	Tolkien	Ohlmarks	Andersson
Whole book	The Lord of the Rings	Sagan om Ringen (The Saga of the Ring)	Ringarnas herre (The Rings' lord)
Volume I	The Fellowship of the Ring	Härskarringen (The Ring of Ruling)	Ringens brödraskap (The Ring's brotherhood)
Volume II	The Two Towers	Sagan om de två tornen (The Saga of the Two Towers)	De två tornen (The Two Towers)
Volume III	The Return of the King	Sagan om konungens återkomst (The Saga of the Return of the King)	Konungens återkomst (The King's return)

=== Names ===
Strömbom comments that Ohlmarks prefers to give names a desired form, where Andersson wants to stay close to the meanings of the original names. Ohlmarks uses Lavskägge (Lichen-beard) for Treebeard, and Vattnadal (Water-dale) for Rivendell, where Andersson chooses the more literal Trädskägge and Riftedal (although, its worth noting, Swedish does contain riven, "torn, split", where rift, "scratch, crack, gap", is uncommon). She adds that sometimes Ohlmarks' choices come closer to the sound of Tolkien's names.

How Ohlmarks and Andersson translate names
Tolkien	Ohlmarks	Andersson
Baggins	Bagger	Secker (sounds like 'Sacks')
Bag End	Baggershus	Säcks ände Sack's end
Barliman Butterbur	Barliman Bytteson, Smörblomma; Barliman Bucketson, Buttercup	Malte Smörblom; Malte Buttercup (sounds like 'Malt')
Gaffer [Gamgee]	Gubbtjuven (derogatory term for an old man)	Gammelfar; Grandad, granpa
Mount Doom	Domedagsberget; Doomsday Mountain	Domberget; Judgement Mountain
The One Ring	den enda ringen, härskarringen The one ring, the master ring	den stora ringen, den främsta ringen, den rätta, härskarringen The great ring, the first ring, the right one, the master ring
Rivendell	Vattnadal; Waterdale, Water valley	Riftedal; Rift-dale, Rivendale
Sackville-Baggins	Säcksta-Bagger; Sacktown-Bagger	Kofferdi-Secker; Leathercase-Secker (see Baggins above)
Treebeard	Lavskägge; Lichenbeard	Trädskägge; Treebeard

=== Prose ===
Commentators including Petter Lindgren in Aftonbladet have remarked on Ohlmarks's wordy text compared to Andersson's more laconic version. Strömbom notes the following as an instance of the difference in styles and length:

A comparison of Ohlmarks and Andersson's translations
Tolkien	Ohlmarks 1959–1961	Andersson and Olsson 2005
Indeed, few Hobbits had ever seen or sailed upon the Sea, and fewer still had ever returned to report it. (20 words)	Det var ju så, att sjömanslivet alls inte passade samman med hobernas allmänna läggning. Ytterst få hade sett havet, ännu färre befarit det, och av dem som verkligen seglat hade blott ett försvinnande fåtal återvänt och kunnat berätta om vad de upplevat. (42 words)	Över huvud taget var det få hobbitar som hade sett havet eller färdats på det, och ännu färre hade återvänt och berättat om det. (24 words)
Back-translations	It was just such, that the sailor's life did not fit in at all with the general disposition of the hobbits. Extremely few had seen the sea, even fewer had sailed it, and of those who really had sailed, only a vanishingly few had returned and been able to tell of what they had experienced.	There were overall few hobbits who had seen the sea or travelled on it, and even fewer had returned and told about it.

=== Verse ===
Aftonbladet wrote of the poetry that "Lotta Olsson has had the thankless task of translating the book's numerous verses which many readers skip, though she does it well and economically". Olsson rendered a sample of Tolkien's verse like this:

The Rhyme of the Rings
Tolkien
Ohlmarks 1959–1961
Olsson, in Andersson 2005

One Ring to rule them all, One Ring to find them,
One Ring to bring them all and in the darkness bind them
In the Land of Mordor where the Shadows lie.

En ring att sämja dem, en ring att främja dem,
en ring att djupt i mörkrets vida riken tämja dem
i Mordors land där skuggorna ruva.

En ring att styra dem, en ring att se dem,
en ring att fånga dem och till mörkret ge dem,
i Mordor, i skuggornas land.

Back-translations

One ring to unite them, one ring to bring them forth,
one ring to deep in the wide realms of darkness tame them
in Mordor's land where the shadows brood.

One ring to rule them, one ring to see them,
one ring to catch them and to the darkness give them,
in Mordor, in the shadows' land.

== See also ==
- Translations of The Lord of the Rings
- Translations of The Lord of the Rings into Russian

== Bibliography ==
Ohlmarks' translation of The Lord of the Rings

- Sagan om ringen. Stockholm: Gebers. 1959. OCLC 43127536. (Volume 1)
- Sagan om de två tornen. Stockholm: Gebers. 1960. OCLC 186811060. (Volume 2)
- Sagan om konungens återkomst. Stockholm: Gebers. 1961. OCLC 43141566. (Volume 3)

Andersson and Olsson's translation of The Lord of the Rings

- Ringens brödraskap: första delen av Ringarnas herre. Stockholm: Norstedt. 2004. OCLC 186369912. (Volume 1)
- De två tornen: andra delen av Ringarnas herre. Stockholm: Norstedt. 2005. OCLC 186594636. (Volume 2)
- Konungens återkomst: tredje delen av Ringarnas herre. Stockholm: Norstedt. 2005. OCLC 186770341. (Volume 3)

Tolkien

- Carpenter, Humphrey, ed. (2023) [1981]. The Letters of J. R. R. Tolkien: Revised and Expanded Edition. New York: HarperCollins. ISBN 978-0-35-865298-4.
- Hammond, Wayne G.; Scull, Christina (2005). The Lord of the Rings: A Reader's Companion. London: HarperCollins. ISBN 0-00-720907-X.
- Tolkien, J. R. R. (1975). "Guide to the Names in The Lord of the Rings". In Lobdell, Jared (ed.). A Tolkien Compass. La Salle, Illinois: Open Court. pp. 159–201. ISBN 0-87548-316-X. OCLC 1055562.

Secondary sources

- Honegger, Thomas, ed. (2011a). Tolkien in Translation. Cormarë series. Vol. 4. Zurich: Walking Tree Publishers. ISBN 978-3-9521424-6-2.
