= Åke Ohlmarks =

Swedish writer and academic (1911–1984)

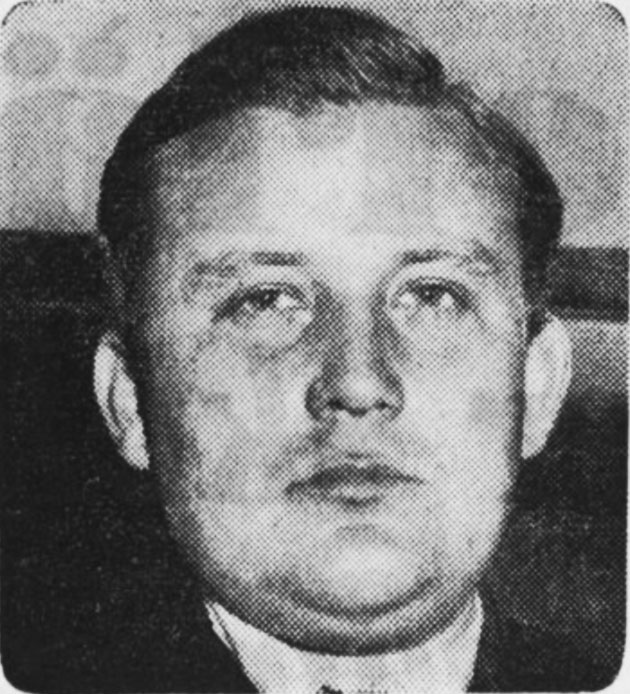
- Born: 3 June 1911; Kristianstad, Sweden
- Died: 6 June 1984 (aged 73); Crist di Niardo, Brescia, Italy

Academic background
- Education: Lund University
- Thesis: Heimdalls Horn und Odins Auge

Academic work
- Discipline: philology; linguistics; religious studies
- Institutions: University of Greifswald
- Notable works: translation of The Lord of the Rings

Åke Joel Ohlmarks (3 June 1911 – 6 June 1984) was a Swedish author, translator and scholar of philology, linguistics and religious studies. He worked as a lecturer at the University of Greifswald from 1941 to 1945, where he founded the institute for religious studies together with the Deutsche Christen member Wilhelm Koepp. His most notable contribution to the field is his 1939 study of Shamanism. As a translator, he is notable for his Swedish version of the Icelandic Edda, of Shakespeare's works and a heavily criticised translation of J. R. R. Tolkien's The Lord of the Rings, as well as a version of the Qur'an and works by writers including Dante and Nostradamus.

== Early life and career ==
Ohlmarks was born in Kristianstad, Sweden, and was the son of wholesaler Joel Ohlmarks and Anna-Lisa Larsson. He studied Nordic languages and the history of religion at Lund University, where he immersed himself in student life and became renowned for his occasional poetry and Spex writing. After earning a bachelor's degree he was editor of a student newspaper and then worked as Swedish lecturer in Tübingen from 1933 to 1934 and in Reykjavík from 1935 to 1936. He earned a Licentiate of Philosophy degree in 1935 and a Doctor of Philosophy degree in 1937, but his doctoral thesis Heimdalls Horn und Odins Auge was criticised for lacking philological accuracy and he failed to get a readership (docentbetyg) in Sweden, which Ohlmarks claimed was because his satirical poetry had angered his professors.

He was docent and associate professor in the Swedish language in Greifswald from 1941 to 1945. There he founded an institute for religious studies, which he led until he left the city shortly before it was invaded by the Red Army. He did not adjust his scholarship in line with National Socialist ideology and later denied being a Nazi, but his conduct at the time has been described as opportunistic and as a combination of adaptation, collaboration and ignorance.

Ohlmarks was director of Europafilm's manuscript department from 1950 to 1959, visiting professor in Zürich in 1965 and head of the Institut für vergleichende Felsbildforschung in Rheinklingen in 1966. He was also a co-worker of the Die Tat in Zürich from 1966. He published about eighty works of popular science and history of varying quality, and roughly as many translations, in addition to nine novels and four volumes of autobiography. His great productivity was partly caused by financial problems after his time at Europafilm.

He was chairman of the Association of Nordic Philologists (Föreningen nordiska filologer) in Lund from 1931 to 1934 and of the Academic Society for the Swedish-Baltic Cooperation (Akademiska föreningen för svensk-baltiskt samarbete) from 1938 to 1940. Ohlmarks was secretary in the Science of Religion Coummunity (Religionsvetenskapliga samfundet) in Lund from 1936 and the community Ad patriam illustrandam in 1963.

Ohlmarks had a deep interest in Iranian Studies and is the author of Alla Irans härskare and Shiʾa: iranska islams urkunder, the latter being a criticism of Islamic fundamentalism.

== Translation of Tolkien's works ==
Ohlmarks translation of Tolkien's The Lord of the Rings was strongly disliked by the author, prompting him to compile his "Guide to the Names in The Lord of the Rings". Ohlmarks not only invented many expressions of his own, but also took great liberties with the contents of Tolkien's work, both by shortening many parts of it and by inserting his own interpretations. Tolkien was also dissatisfied by the title Sagan om ringen, "The Saga of the Ring".

As a result of the severe criticism directed against his translation of The Lord of the Rings, both by Tolkien himself and by Swedish Tolkien fandom, Ohlmarks in the late 1970s began to display hostility towards the "Tolkien phenomenon", and in 1982 published a book titled Tolkien and Black Magic, expounding a conspiracy theory connecting Tolkien and Tolkien fandom with Nazi occultism.

Despite the criticism and controversy, Ohlmarks's translations remained the only Swedish-language translations of The Lord of the Rings until the publication of a completely new version by Erik Andersson and Lotta Olsson in 2005.

== Personal life ==
In his second marriage, in 1954, he married Letty Steenstrup (born 1919), the daughter of Erling Steenstrup and Ruth Strandnaes. In his third marriage, in 1969, he married editorial assistant Monica Suter (born 1940), daughter of Adolf Suter von Schwyz and his wife. Ohlmarks died in 1984 in Crist di Niardo, Brescia, Italy.

== Publications ==
=== Academic ===
- 1936, Isländska hov och gudahus, in: Bidrag till nordisk filologi tillägnade Emil Olson den 9 juni 1936, S.339-355.
- 1936, Totenerweckung in Eddaliedern, in: Arkiv för nordisk filologi 52, S 264–297.
- 1937, Heimdalls Horn und Odins Auge. Studien zur nordischen und vergleichenden Religionsgeschichte, Erstes Buch (I-II) Heimdallr und das Horn, Lund.
- 1939, Studien zum Problem des Schamanismus, Lund.
- 1939, Anmärkningar och genmäle angående Heimdall, in: Arkiv för nordisk filologi 54, S. 354–363.
- 1939, Arktischer Schamanismus und altnordischer Seiðr, in: Archiv für Religionswissenschaft 36, S. 171–180.
- 1941, Stellt die mythische Bifrost den Regenbogen oder die Milchstrasse dar? Eine textkritisch-religionshistorische Untersuchung zur mythographischen Arbeitsmethode Snorri Sturlusons, (Meddelande från Lunds astronomiska observatorium, Ser. II Nr. 110), Lund.
- 1941, Das Grabschiff. Studien zur vorgeschichtlichen nordischen Religionsgeschichte, i: Zeitschrift für systematische Theologie 18, S. 150–158.
- 1943, Studien zur altgermanischen Religionsgeschichte. 4 Aufsätze, Leipzig.
- 1943, Die klassischen Isländersagas und ihr Ehrbegriff, in: Grundmann, Walter (Hg.), Die völkische Gestalt des Glaubens, Leipzig, S. 157–220.
- with Lars Åkerberg (1944), Thomas Thorild als Vorläufer der neuzeitlichen Religionswissenschaft, Greifswald.
- 1944, Alt-Uppsala und Urnes. Untersuchung zur Entstehung der Dreischiffstabkirche und des ältesten germanisch-heidnischen Kulthauses, (Meddelande från Lunds astronomiska observatorium, Ser. II Nr. 115), Lund.
- 1944, Alt-Uppsala und Arkona, in: Vetenskapssocieteten i Lund, Årsbok 1943, Lund, S. 79–120.
- 1945, „Toalettredskapen“ och solreligionen under yngre bronsåldern, in: Fornvännen 40, S. 337–358.
- 1946, Gravskeppet. Studier i förhistorisk nordisk religionshistoria, Stockholm.
- 1963, Hällristningarnas gudar. En sammanställning och ett förklarningsförsök, Stockholm.
- 1979, Vårt nordiska arv. från 10.000 f.Kr. till medeltidens början, Stockholm.

=== Autobiographical ===
- I paradiset. Levnadsminnen I, Uddevalla (1965).
- Doktor i Lund. En bok om akademiska intriger, Stockholm (1980).
- Efter mig Syndafloden. Greifswald-Berlin-Hamburg 1941–1945, Köping (1980).

== See also ==
- Translations of The Lord of the Rings
- Translation of The Lord of the Rings into Swedish
