= Dominique Horwitz =

French actor and singer

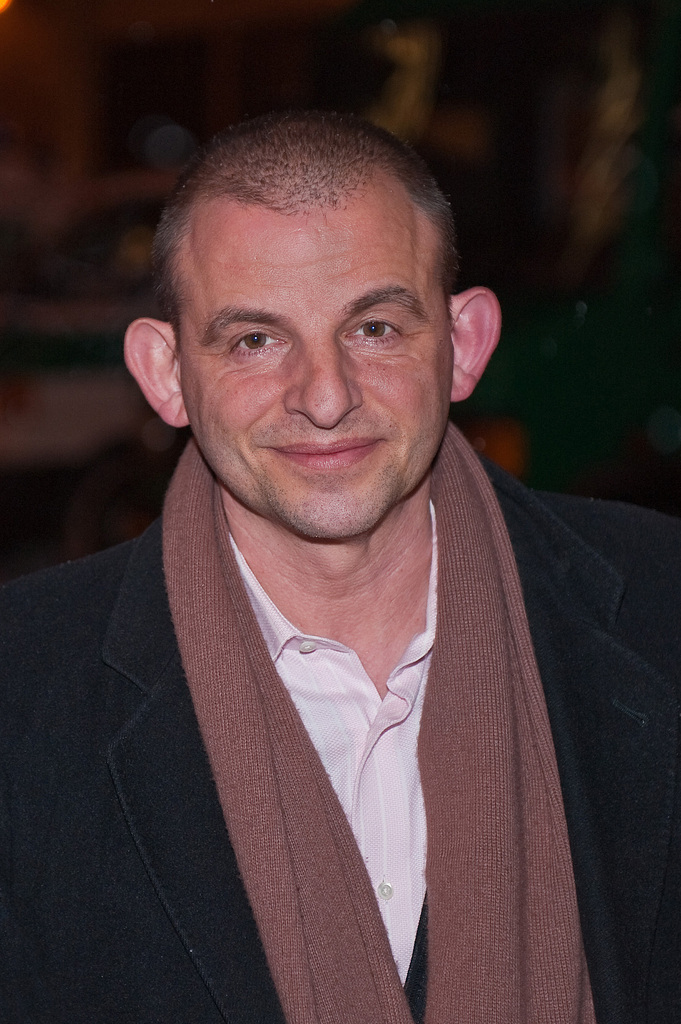
- Dominique Horwitz in February 2010
- Born: 23 April 1957 (age 69); Paris, France
- Occupation: Actor
- Years active: 1979–present

Dominique Horwitz (born 23 April 1957) is a French film and television actor and singer.

== Life ==
Horwitz was born on 23 April 1957 in Paris, France, to German Jewish refugee parents, who had both fled Nazi Germany. In 1971 the family moved to Berlin. He attended a Franco-German grammar-school. He has a sister and a brother. For about twenty years, Horwitz was located in Hamburg where he was married. From his first marriage with his wife Patricia he has two children, the actress Miriam and Laszlo. He currently lives with his second wife Anna and the children Mick and Marlene in Tiefengruben, Bad Berka, a village near Weimar in Thuringia. He is a prominent supporter of social institutions in Weimar, where he helps unemployed youths in a boxing club. He also organises boxing tournaments and links them with culture. Between the boxing matches musical newcomers can perform their music.

== Career ==
He has appeared in over thirty films and over fifty television productions. His first screen role was appearing as Leo Singer in the film David (1979).

In 1992, Horwitz received the Golden Lion Award for the Best Actor from the Venice Film Festival.

He played the role of the Devil (pegleg) in the theatre production The Black Rider (William S. Burroughs, Robert Wilson, Tom Waits).

Horwitz is perhaps best known for playing Obergefreiter Fritz Reiser in Stalingrad (1993).

=== Selected filmography ===
Year	Film	Role	Genre
1979	David	Leo Singer	war drama
1987	The Madonna Man	Flamm	crime
1988	Fifty-Fifty	Willi	comedy
1988	Martha Jelleneck	Zivi Thomas	drama
1990	The Black Rider	Pegleg	drama musical fantasy
1991	Hausmänner	-	comedy
1991	Anna Goldin, the Last Witch	Kubli	historical drama
1992	Dead Flowers	Willy De Ville	drama
1993	Stalingrad	Obergefreiter Fritz Reiser	war drama
1998	The Little Girl Who Fell from the Tree	Ben	thriller
1998	Women Don't Lie	Xavier	romantic comedy
1999	Nightshapes	Victor	
2001	Anne Frank: The Whole Story	Hans Goslar	mini-series
2003	Sams in Gefahr	Fitzgerald Daume	comedy
2005	A Quiet Love	Kommissar Poulsen	romantic comedy
2005	Shooting Dogs	Capitaine Charles Delon	drama
2006	Strike	Kazimierz Walczak	drama

=== Television work ===
Year	Title	Role	Genre
1983	Rote Erde	Rudi Schickert	TV series
1986	The Lenz Papers	Amand Goegg	TV miniseries
1993	The Secret of Coach 13	Valentin	drama, television film
1997	Trickser	Erik	crime
2007	Krauses Fest	Forstarbeiter Leibmann	Weihnachtskomodie, Fernseh film
