= Floriane Daniel =

German actress (born 1971)

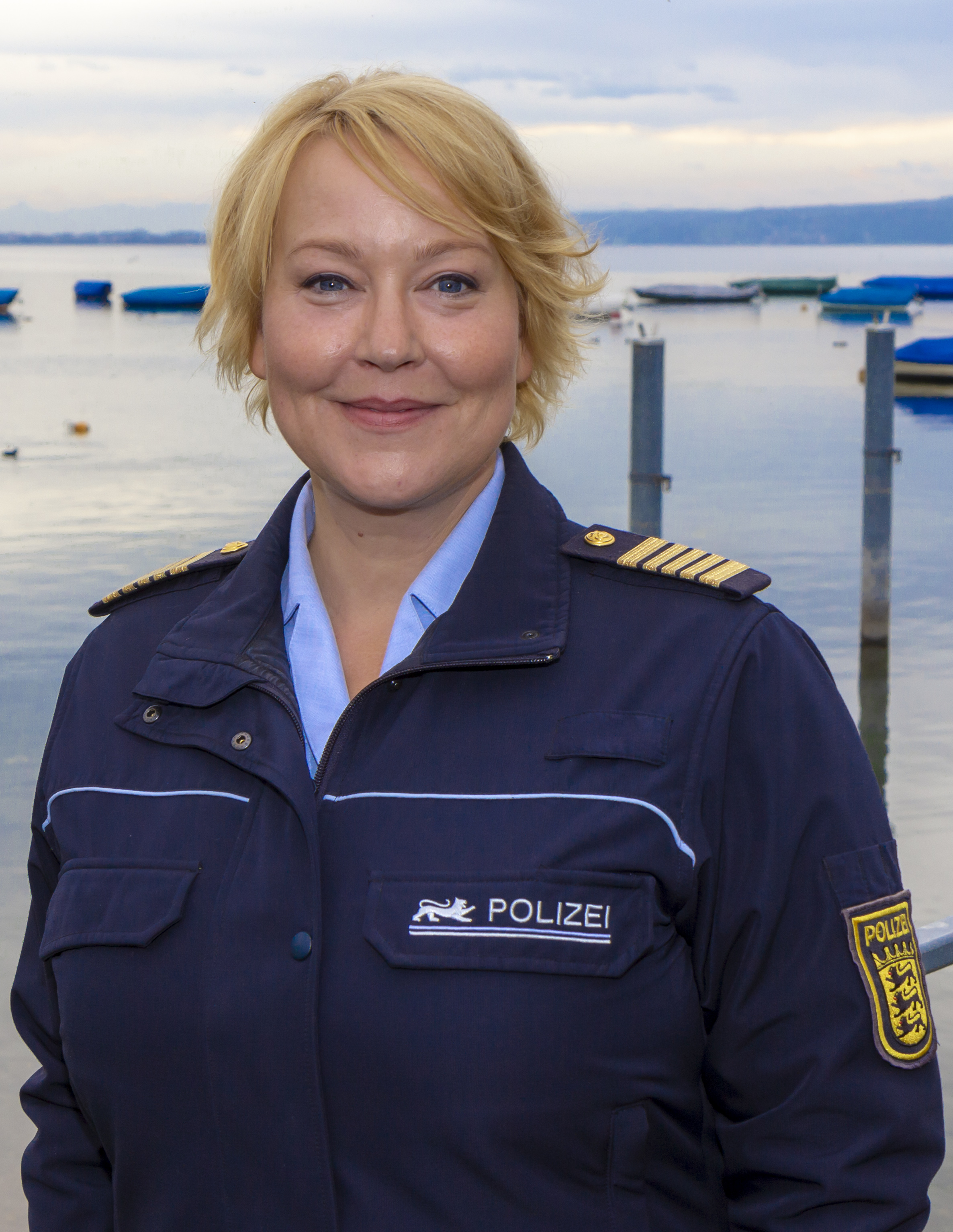
- Born: 17 September 1971 (age 54); West Berlin, West Germany
- Occupation: Actress
- Years active: 1993-present

Floriane Daniel (born 17 September 1971) is a German actress. She has appeared in more than ninety films since 1993.

== Biography ==
Floriane Daniel is the oldest of seven siblings. During her school years at various Waldorf schools in West Berlin, she had several opportunities to be on stage in theater productions. After deciding to become an actress, she began training at the Stage Studio of the Performing Arts in Hamburg. After appearing in several theater and television productions, she made her breakthrough in 1996 with the leading role of Rebecca in the feature film Winter Sleepers by director Tom Tykwer.

Floriane Daniel has been the mother of a daughter since 2002 and lives in Berlin and Hamburg.

== Selected filmography ==
| Year | Title | Role | Notes |
|---|---|---|---|
| 1993 | Clara | Leni | TV miniseries |
| 1997 | Winter Sleepers | Rebecca | |
| 1998 | The Little Girl Who Fell from the Tree | Jenny | |
| 2008 | Cherry Blossoms | Emma | |
