= Ingo Naujoks =

German actor (born 1962)

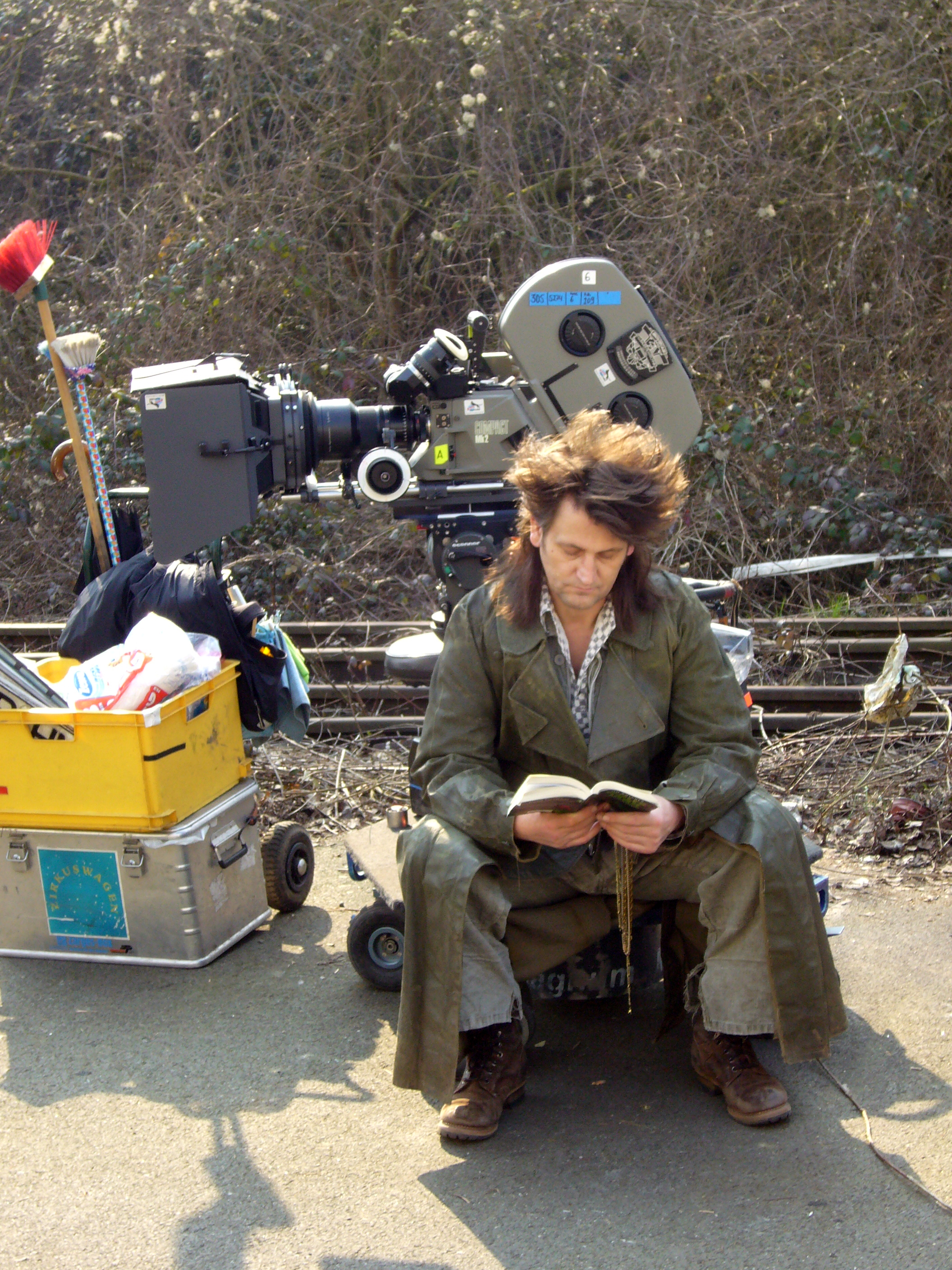
Naujoks in 2007

Ingo Naujoks (born 1 March 1962 in Bochum, West Germany) is a German actor.

Naujoks won the German Comedy Award for his performance in the TV series Bewegte Männer. He is also known for his performance in Rick and Olli.

Naujoks has also portrayed Rufus, the human Grouch on Sesamstrasse, the German version of Sesame Street.

== Filmography ==
- Rote Erde (1990, TV series, 3 episodes), as Hannes
- Karniggels (1991), as Elle
- Frankie, Jonny & die anderen (1993), as Ingo
- Magic Müller (1993), as Müller
- Nobody Loves Me (1994), as Lasse Laengsfeld
- Brother of Sleep (1995), as Feldwebel Hirsch
- Heaven or Bust (1995), as Rio Kowalski
- Der Mörder und die Hure (1996, TV film), as Mütze
- Dangerous Dowry (1996), as Fendel
- Schlag 12 (1996, TV film), as Max Müller-Burghardt
- Die Aktion (1996, TV film), as Sven Droste
- Weibsbilder (1996), as Winnie
- Die Traumnummer – Die Hotline zum Glück (1996, TV film), as Wenzel
- Harald (1997), as Frido Lipinski
- Hollister (1997, TV film), as Tom
- Die Straßen von Berlin (1998–1999, TV series, 12 episodes), as Frank Karnowsky
- The Little Girl Who Fell from the Tree (1998), as Leo
- Der Laden (1998, TV miniseries), as Phile
- Anke (2000–2001, TV series, 24 episodes), as Tom
- Der tote Taucher im Wald (2000), as Harry Minx
- Cold Is the Evening Breeze (2000), as Anton
- Der Runner (2000, TV film), as Rick
- Lotto-Liebe (2001, TV film), as Thilo
- The Hunted Child (2001, TV film), as Peter Nowak
- Gnadenlose Bräute (2001, TV film), as Bruno
- Vor meiner Zeit (2001, TV film), as Walter
- Paulas Schuld (2001, TV film), as Beckmann
- Tattoo (2002), as Stefan Kreiner
- Tatort (2002–2010, TV series, 16 episodes), as Martin Felser
- Heart or Cash (2002, TV film), as Christian Morus
- Tanners letzte Chance (2002, TV film), as Herbert Knocke
- Paradise Is a Trap (2002, TV film), as Goldi
- Twin Sisters (2002), as Heinrich Bamberg
- Unser Papa, das Genie (2002, TV film), as Zacharias Stern
- Mörderherz (2002, TV film), as Hermann Schwarz
- Ein Engel und Paul (2003), as Charly
- Bewegte Männer (2003–2005, TV series, 33 episodes), as Frank Hilsmann
- Girl Overboard (2005, TV film), as Herkenrode
- Mama und der Millionär (2005, TV film), as Frieder Wohlfahrt
- Suche Mann für meine Frau (2005, TV film), as Paul Willke
- Tsunami: Terror in the North Sea (2005, TV film), as Holger
- Maria an Callas (2006), as Axel
- Ein Hauptgewinn für Papa (2006, TV film), as Johannes Haugk
- Arme Millionäre (2006, TV series, 4 episodes), as Joe
- Vater Undercover – Im Auftrag der Familie (2006, TV film), as Pit
- Rick and Olli (2006, TV series, 6 episodes), as Olli
- Ein Teufel für Familie Engel (2007, TV film), as Rainer Engel
- Theo, Agnes, Bibi und die anderen (2007, TV film), as Udo Troester
- Underdogs (2007), as Peter Prell
- Krauses Fest (2007, TV film), as Günter Dost
- Verrückt nach Emma (2008, TV film), as Bernd
- Der Prinz von nebenan (2008, TV film), as Axel Kruse
- Run for Your Life! (2008, TV film), as Schweizer
- Schade um das schöne Geld (2008, TV film), as Piet Blinker
- Ein Sommer mit Paul (2009, TV film), as Jakob Sprenger
- Lilly the Witch: The Dragon and the Magic Book (2009), as Jerome
- Zimmer mit Tante (2010, TV film), as Professor Franz Gmeiner
- From Istanbul with Love (2011, TV film), as Pawnbroker
- Jetzt sind wir dran (2011, TV film), as Helmut
- Morden im Norden (since 2012, TV series, 184 episodes), as Kriminalhauptkommissar Lars Englen
- Auf den zweiten Blick (2012), as Benjamin
- Friendship on Hold (2014, TV film), as Teddy
- Futuro Beach (2014), as Mechanic
- Radio Heimat (2016), as Grandfather
