= The Journey (1986 film) =

- Directed by: Markus Imhoof
- Written by: Markus Imhoof; Martin Wiebel
- Based on: Die Reise; 1977 novel by Bernward Vesper
- Produced by: Regina Ziegler; George Reinhart
- Starring: Markus Boysen
- Cinematography: Hans Liechti
- Edited by: Ursula West
- Music by: Franco Ambrosetti
- Release date: 1986
- Running time: 105 minutes
- Language: German

The Journey (German: Die Reise) is a 1986 Swiss-West German drama film written and directed by Markus Imhoof.

The film was entered into the main competition at the 43rd edition of the Venice Film Festival.

== Cast ==
- Markus Boysen as Bertram Voss (based on Bernward Vesper)
- Corinna Kirchhoff as Dagmar Wegener (based on Gudrun Ensslin)
- Will Quadflieg as Vater Jost Voss (based on Will Vesper)
- Christa Berndl as Mutter Voss
- Alexander Mehner as Florian
- Claude-Oliver Rudolph as Rolf Schröder (based on Andreas Baader)
- Gero Prenn as Bertram als Kind
