= Claude-Oliver Rudolph =

German actor, producer, screenwriter, and film director

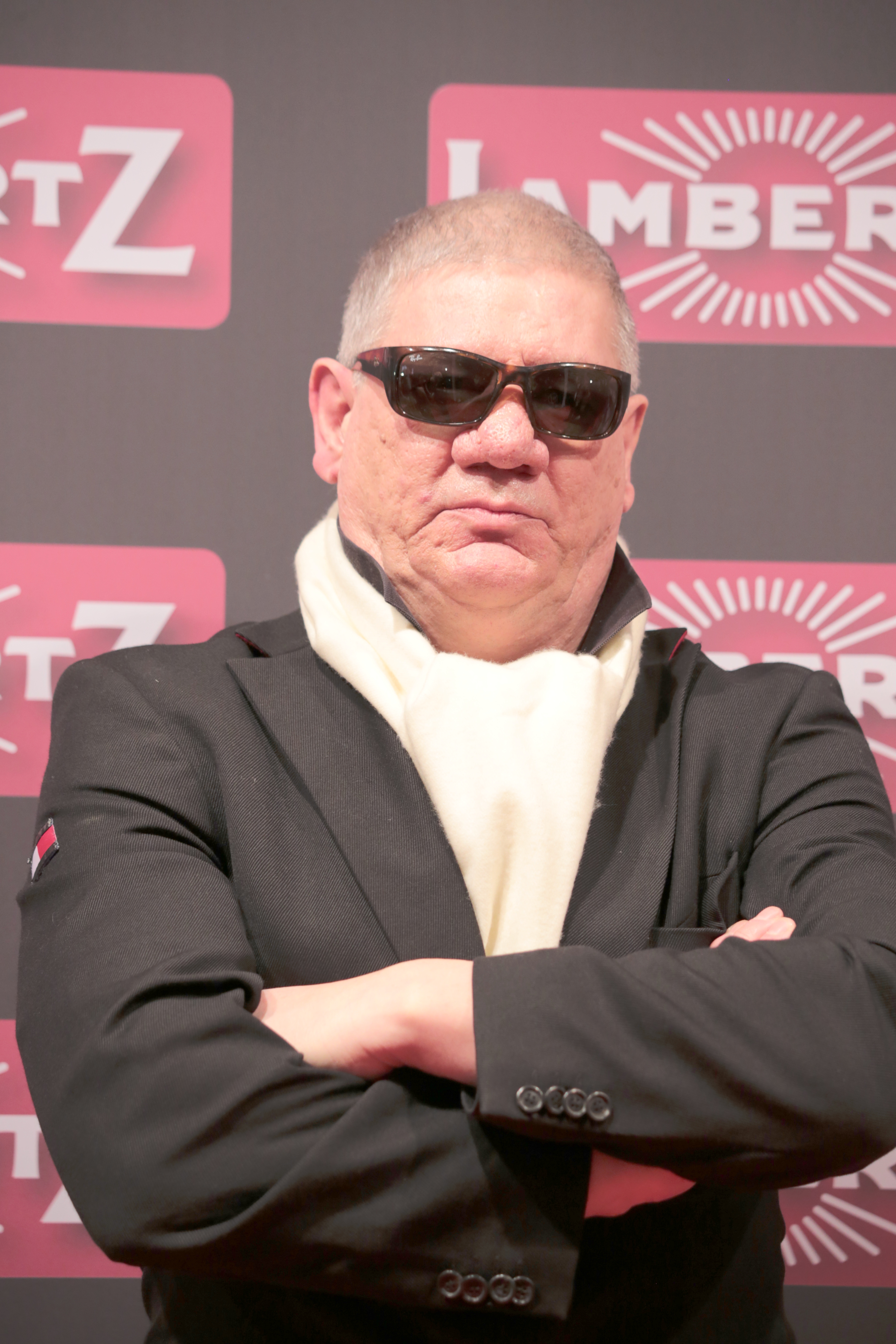
Claude-Oliver Rudolph at Lambertz Monday Night 2018

Claude-Oliver Rudolph (born 30 November 1956 in Frankfurt) is a German actor, producer, screenwriter, and film director.

== Life and work ==
Internationally, he is known in the James Bond film The World Is Not Enough alongside Pierce Brosnan. Rudolph is known to German-speaking audiences, among others, from the film Das Boot and the TV series Rote Erde.

Claude-Oliver Rudolph dubbed the film The Wrestler.

In 2011 Rudolph acquired the rights to protect the name of Hans Albers' biography. Along with Frank Otto wanted Rudolph by his own admission a movie and a musical called Hans Albers - the blonde rebel publish. To date, no implementation has taken place (as of January 2020).

Rudolph has worked for the television broadcaster RT (formerly "Russia Today") since April 2016. There he worked under the editor-in-chief Ivan Rodionow as "Head of Art and Culture" with his own program Clash. From 18 September 2016 to 16 June 2019, he hosted 26 episodes of the talk show.

== Filmography (selection) ==
Actor

- Palermo or Wolfsburg (1980) - Mann
- Das Boot (1981) - Ario
- Operation Leo (1981) - Willy
- Rote Erde (1983) - Bruno Kruska
- Alpha City (1985) - Frank
- The Journey (1986) - Schröder
- The Aggression (1987) - Jakob Winkler
- Blinde Leidenschaft (1988)
- The Voice (1989)
- Autumn Milk (1989) - Official
- Deathline (1996) - Milan
- Life Is a Bluff (1996) - Schleimer
- Die 3 Posträuber (1998) - Krummer Otto
- The World Is Not Enough (1999) - Colonel Akakievich
- Le club des chômeurs (2003) - Un touriste allemand
- Dirty Sky (2003)
- Chaostage (2009) - Brunner
- Kopf oder Zahl (2009) - Schrotthändler Karl
- Cargo (2009) - Igor Prokoff
- Gegengerade (2011) - Dr. Hennings
- Fahr zur Hölle (2011) - Gabriel
- Robin Hood: Ghosts of Sherwood (2012) - Guy of Gisbourne
- Mann im Spagat: Pace, Cowboy, Pace (2016) - Der Teufel vom Hermanplatz
- Alice: The Darkest Hour (2018) - The doctor
- Breakdown Forest - Reise in den Abgrund (2019) - Ruprecht Knochenhauer
- Knorx (2019) - Förster

Director

- The Wonderbeats: Kings of Beat (1990)
- Ebbie's Bluff (1993)

== Awards ==
- 1984: German actor award Chaplin Shoe in the category Best Young Actor for his role in Rote Erde
- 2013: Honorary award of the Eat My Shorts - Hagen Short Film Festival, Germany
- 2022: Jean Gabin - Prize at the Eat My Shorts - Hagen Short Film Festival, Germany
