= Michael Bartlett (director) =

American film director

Michael F. Bartlett is an American filmmaker, producer, screenwriter, and editor.

== Life and career ==
Bartlett directed 'Breaking Bad' series star R.J. Mitte in his first feature film, the supernatural thriller 'House of Last Things.' Bartlett sometimes stages his screenplays within his own residences, and 'House of Last Things' was written to fit the location exactly.

== Filmography ==
Year	Film	Director	Writer	Actor	Editor	Producer	Notes
1987	Concerto for the Right Hand	Yes	Yes	Yes	No	Yes	
1996	Wie es ihr gefällt - Cheryl Studer, eine amerikanische Sopranistin	Yes	Yes	No	Yes	No	TV movie
1998	The Little Girl Who Fell from the Tree	Yes	Yes	No	No	No	
2013	House of Last Things	Yes	Yes	Yes	Yes	Yes	
2019	The Berlin Bride	Yes	Yes	No	Yes	Yes	
