= The Little Girl Who Fell from the Tree =

1998 film

- Directed by: Michael Bartlett
- Starring: Dominique Horwitz; Floriane Daniel
- Release date: 16 April 1998
- Running time: 1h 52min
- Country: Germany
- Language: German

The Little Girl Who Fell From the Tree (German: Ein tödliches Verhältnis) is a 1998 German thriller film written and directed by Michael Bartlett. Bartlett directed the film in Berlin's Babelsberg Studio for Rialto Film Berlin.

The film made its debut at the AFI/Los Angeles International Film Festival on October 25, 1998 and won the Best Editing Award.

== Cast ==
- Dominique Horwitz - Ben
- Floriane Daniel - Jenny
- Julia Jäger - Lisa
- Dorothea Moritz - Frau Prack
- Ingo Naujoks - Leo
- Rainer Strecker - Vater
- Manfred Banach
- Ulrike Hübschmann - Gynäkologin
