= Sagan om ringen (1971 film) =

- Title card from the first episode
- Genre: Fantasy
- Written by: Sören Erlandsson (adaptation)
- Directed by: Bo Hansson
- Narrated by: Evan Storm
- Composer: Bo Hansson
- Country of origin: Sweden
- Original language: Swedish

Production
- Producer: Urban Lasson
- Running time: 28 minutes
- Production company: Sveriges television

Original release
- Network: SVT1
- Release: 1971

Sagan om ringen is a 1971 Swedish live action television film in two episodes. The film was inspired by the music album Music Inspired by Lord of the Rings by Bo Hansson, which in turn was inspired by J. R. R. Tolkien's 1954 novel The Lord of the Rings.

Live actors were filmed and inserted into hand drawn backgrounds.

Drawings were made by Peter Lindblom.

== Plot ==
The film covers quite faithfully the events of the first half of The Fellowship of the Ring, starting with Bilbo's birthday party and ending with the fellowship leaving Rivendell.

Unlike in Peter Jackson's adaptation, the journey of the hobbits to Bree includes their encounters with Old Man Willow and Tom Bombadil. Moreover, Glorfindel and his horse Asfaloth are depicted during the attack of the Black Riders. On the other hand, the character of Boromir is absent from Elrond's council.
