= The Lord of the Rings =

1954–1955 fantasy novel by J. R. R. Tolkien

- Cover to the first single-volume edition (1968) by Pauline Baynes
- Author: J. R. R. Tolkien
- Language: English
- Genre: High fantasy; Adventure
- Set in: Middle-earth
- Publisher: Allen & Unwin
- Publication date: 29 July 1954 (The Fellowship of the Ring); 11 November 1954 (The Two Towers); 20 October 1955 (The Return of the King)
- Publication place: United Kingdom
- Media type: Print (hardback and paperback)
- Pages: 1077 (first single-volume edition)
- OCLC: 1487587
- Preceded by: The Hobbit
- Followed by: The Adventures of Tom Bombadil

The Lord of the Rings is a high fantasy novel (Note: J. R. R. Tolkien disliked having the word "novel" applied to his works, preferring the phrase "heroic romance", but "novel" is commonly applied. (Note: Carpenter 2023, letter #329 to Peter Szabo Szentmihalyi, October 1971)) written by the English author and scholar J. R. R. Tolkien. Set in Middle-earth, the epic began as a sequel to Tolkien's 1937 children's book The Hobbit but eventually developed into a much larger work. Written in stages between 1937 and 1949, The Lord of the Rings is one of the best-selling books ever written, with over 150 million copies sold.

The title refers to the story's main antagonist, (Note: Tolkien has the wizard Gandalf say to the hobbit Frodo "the Black Riders are the Ringwraiths, the Nine Servants of the Lord of the Rings." (Note: Tolkien, J. R. R. (1954a). The Fellowship of the Ring. The Lord of the Rings. Boston: Houghton Mifflin. OCLC 9552942. book 2, ch. 1 "Many Meetings")) the Dark Lord Sauron, who in an earlier age created the One Ring, allowing him to rule the other Rings of Power given to men, dwarves, and elves, in his campaign to conquer all of Middle-earth. From homely beginnings in the Shire, a hobbit land reminiscent of the English countryside, the story ranges across Middle-earth, following the quest to destroy the One Ring, seen mainly through the eyes of the hobbits Frodo, Sam, Merry, and Pippin. Aiding the hobbits are the wizard Gandalf, the men Aragorn and Boromir, the elf Legolas, and the dwarf Gimli, who unite as the Company of the Ring to rally the Free Peoples of Middle-earth against Sauron's armies and give Frodo a chance to destroy the One Ring in the fires of Mount Doom.

Tolkien drew inspiration from various influences for the story, including philology, mythology, Christianity, earlier fantasy works, and his own experiences in the First World War. Although the work is often called a trilogy, Tolkien intended it to be a single volume in a two-volume set, along with The Silmarillion. (Note: Carpenter 2023, letter #126 to Milton Waldman (draft), 10 March 1950) For economic reasons, it was first published over the course of a year, from 29 July 1954 to 20 October 1955, in three volumes rather than one, under the titles The Fellowship of the Ring, The Two Towers, and The Return of the King; The Silmarillion appeared only after Tolkien's death. The work is divided internally into six books, two per volume, with several appendices of chronologies, genealogies, and linguistic information. (Note: Volume I: Prologue, The Ring Sets Out, The Ring Goes South; Volume II: The Treason of Isengard, The Ring Goes East; Volume III: The War of the Ring, The End of the Third Age, Appendices A–F.) These three volumes were later published as a boxed set in 1957, and finally as a single volume in 1968, following Tolkien's original intent.

After an initial mixed reception by the literary establishment, The Lord of the Rings has been the subject of extensive analysis of its themes, literary devices, and origins. It is considered one of the most influential fantasy books ever written, and has helped to create and shape the modern fantasy genre. Since release, it has been reprinted many times and translated into at least 38 languages. (Note: At least 38 languages are listed at the FAQ. This number is a very conservative estimate; some 56 translations are listed at translations of The Lord of the Rings, and 57 languages are listed at Elrond's Library.) Its enduring popularity has led to numerous references in popular culture, the founding of many societies by fans of Tolkien's works, and the publication of many books about Tolkien and his works. It has inspired many derivative works, including paintings, music, films, television, video games, and board games. Award-winning adaptations of The Lord of the Rings have been made for radio, theatre, and film. It was named Britain's best-loved novel of all time in a 2003 poll by the BBC called The Big Read.

== Plot ==
=== The Fellowship of the Ring ===
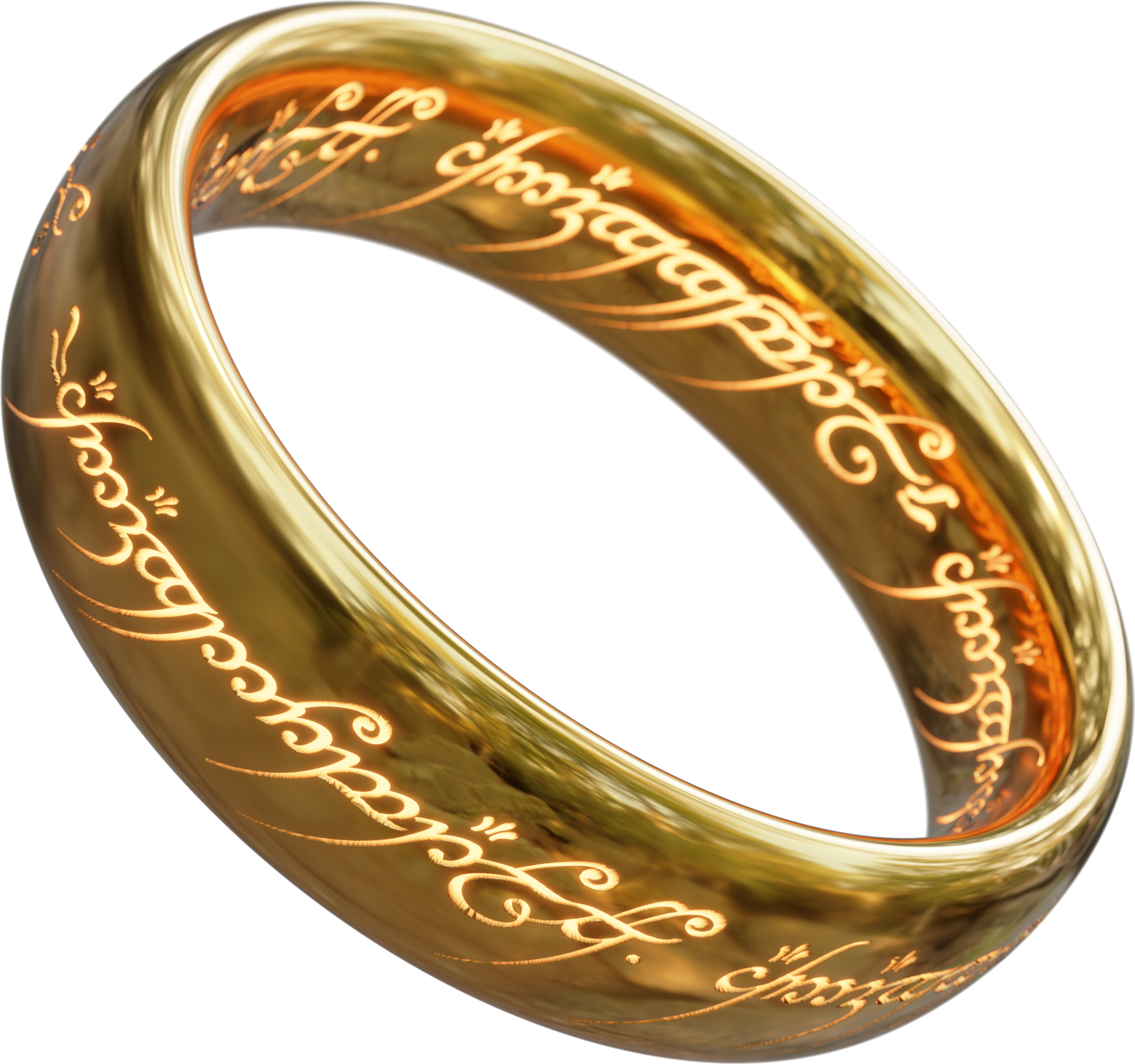
Gandalf proves that Frodo's Ring is the One Ring by throwing it into Frodo's fireplace, revealing the hidden text of the Rhyme of the Rings.

Bilbo Baggins celebrates his birthday and leaves the Ring to Frodo, his cousin and adopted heir. Gandalf (a wizard) suspects it is a Ring of Power; seventeen years later, he confirms it is the One Ring, lost by the Dark Lord Sauron, and counsels Frodo to take it away from the Shire. Gandalf leaves, promising to return, but fails to do so. Frodo sets out on foot with his cousin Pippin Took and gardener Sam Gamgee. They are pursued by Black Riders, but meet some Elves, whose singing to Elbereth wards off the Riders. The Hobbits take an evasive shortcut to Bucklebury Ferry, where they meet their friend Merry Brandybuck. Merry and Pippin reveal they know about the Ring and insist on joining Frodo on his journey. They try to shake off the Black Riders by cutting through the Old Forest. Merry and Pippin are trapped by the malign Old Man Willow, but are rescued by Tom Bombadil. Leaving Tom's house, they are caught by a barrow-wight. Frodo, awakening from the barrow-wight's spell, calls Tom Bombadil, who frees them and gives them ancient swords from the wight's hoard. The Hobbits reach the village of Bree, where they meet Strider, a Ranger. The innkeeper gives Frodo an old letter from Gandalf, which identifies Strider as a friend. Knowing the Black Riders will attempt to seize the Ring, Strider guides the group toward the Elvish sanctuary of Rivendell. At Weathertop, they are attacked by five Black Riders. Their leader wounds Frodo with a cursed blade. Strider fights them off and treats Frodo with the herb athelas. They are joined by the Elf Glorfindel, who rides with Frodo, now deathly ill, towards Rivendell. The Black Riders pursue Frodo into the Ford of Bruinen, where they are swept away by flood waters summoned by Elrond.

Frodo recovers in Rivendell under Elrond's care. Gandalf informs Frodo that the Black Riders are the Nazgûl, Men enslaved by Rings of Power to serve Sauron. The Council of Elrond discusses what to do with the Ring. Strider is revealed to be Aragorn, Isildur's heir. Isildur had cut the Ring from Sauron's self. The Ring was lost when Isildur was killed; it passed to Gollum and then to Bilbo. Gandalf reports that the chief wizard, Saruman, is a traitor. The Council decides that the Ring must be destroyed in the fire of Mount Doom in Mordor, where it was forged. Frodo takes this task upon himself. Elrond chooses companions for him: Sam, Merry, and Pippin; Gandalf; the Men Aragorn and Boromir, son of the Steward of Gondor; the Elf Legolas; and the Dwarf Gimli, representing the Free Peoples of the West. After a failed attempt to cross the Misty Mountains, the Fellowship risk the path through the Mines of Moria. They learn that Balin and his Dwarves, who had attempted to regain possession of Moria, were killed by Orcs. They are attacked by Orcs and a Balrog, a fire demon. Gandalf confronts the Balrog: both fall into an abyss. The others escape to the Elvish forest of Lothlórien, where the Lady Galadriel tests their loyalty, and gives them magical gifts. She allows Frodo and Sam to look into her vision-giving fountain, the Mirror of Galadriel. Frodo offers her the Ring: she refuses, knowing that it would master her. Galadriel's husband Celeborn gives the Fellowship boats, cloaks, and waybread. They travel down the River Anduin. At Amon Hen, Boromir tries to take the Ring, but Frodo puts on the Ring and disappears. Frodo chooses to cross the river and go alone to Mordor, but Sam, guessing what he intends, intercepts and joins him.

=== The Two Towers ===
A party of Orcs sent by Saruman and Sauron attack the Fellowship. Boromir tries to protect Merry and Pippin from the Orcs, but they kill him and capture the two Hobbits. Aragorn, Gimli and Legolas decide to pursue the Orcs. The Orcs are killed by Riders of Rohan, led by Éomer. The Hobbits escape into Fangorn Forest, where they are befriended by the Ent Treebeard. Aragorn, Gimli, and Legolas track the hobbits to Fangorn, where they meet Gandalf: he explains that he killed the Balrog; he too was killed in the fight, but was sent back to Middle-earth. He is now Gandalf the White, replacing Saruman as chief of the wizards. They ride to Edoras, capital of Rohan. Gandalf frees King Théoden from the influence of Saruman's spy Gríma Wormtongue. Théoden musters his army and rides to the fortress of Helm's Deep; Gandalf departs to seek help from Treebeard. The Ents destroy Isengard, Saruman's stronghold, and flood it, trapping the wizard in the tower of Orthanc. Gandalf convinces Treebeard to send an army of Huorns to Théoden's aid. He brings an army of Riders of Rohan to Helm's Deep. They defeat the Orcs, who flee into the forest of Huorns and are destroyed. Gandalf, Théoden, Aragorn, Legolas, and Gimli ride to Isengard, where they find Merry and Pippin relaxing amidst the ruins. Gandalf offers Saruman a chance to turn away from evil. When Saruman refuses, Gandalf strips him of his rank and most of his powers. Wormtongue throws down a hard round object to try to kill Gandalf. Pippin picks it up; Gandalf swiftly takes it, but Pippin steals it in the night. It is a palantír, a seeing-stone that Saruman used to speak with Sauron, becoming ensnared. Sauron sees Pippin, but misunderstands the circumstances. Gandalf rides for Minas Tirith, chief city of Gondor, taking Pippin with him.

Frodo and Sam struggle through the barren hills of the Emyn Muil. They realize they are being tracked; on a moonlit night they capture Gollum, who has followed them from Moria. Frodo makes Gollum swear to serve him, as Ringbearer, and asks him to guide them to Mordor. Gollum leads them across the Dead Marshes. Sam overhears Gollum debating with his alter ego, Sméagol, whether to steal the Ring. The Black Gate of Mordor is too well guarded, so they travel south through Ithilien to a secret pass that Gollum knows. They are captured by rangers led by Faramir, Boromir's brother, and brought to the secret fastness of Henneth Annûn. Faramir resists the temptation to seize the Ring and, disobeying orders to arrest strangers, releases them. Gollum guides the hobbits to the pass, but leads them into the lair of the great spider Shelob in the tunnels of Cirith Ungol. Frodo holds up his gift, the Phial of Galadriel, which holds the light of Eärendil's star: it drives Shelob back. Frodo cuts through a giant web using his sword Sting. Shelob attacks again, and Frodo falls to her venom. Sam picks up Sting and the Phial. He wounds the monster. Believing Frodo to be dead, a devastated Sam takes the Ring to continue the quest alone. Orcs take Frodo; Sam overhears them saying that Frodo is still alive, and sets out to rescue him.

=== The Return of the King ===
Sauron sends a great army against Gondor. Gandalf arrives at Minas Tirith to warn Denethor of the attack, while Théoden musters the Riders of Rohan to go to Gondor's aid. Minas Tirith is besieged; the Lord of the Nazgûl uses a spell-wound battering ram to destroy the city's gates. Denethor, deceived by Sauron, falls into despair. He burns himself alive on a pyre; Pippin and Gandalf rescue his son Faramir from the same fate. Aragorn, accompanied by Legolas, Gimli, and the Rangers of the North, takes the Paths of the Dead to recruit the Dead Men of Dunharrow, oathbreakers who will have no rest until they fight for the King of Gondor. Aragorn unleashes the Army of the Dead on the Corsairs of Umbar invading southern Gondor. He and men of southern Gondor sail in the Corsairs' ships up the Anduin, reaching Minas Tirith just in time to turn the tide of battle. Théoden's niece Éowyn, who joined the army in disguise, kills the Lord of the Nazgûl with help from Merry; both are wounded. Gondor and Rohan defeat Sauron's army in the Battle of the Pelennor Fields, but Théoden is killed. Aragorn enters Minas Tirith and heals the sick. He leads an army through Ithilien to the Black Gate to distract Sauron from his true danger. At the Battle of the Morannon, his army is vastly outnumbered.

Sam rescues Frodo from the tower of Cirith Ungol. They set out across Mordor. When they reach the edge of the Cracks of Doom, Frodo cannot resist the Ring any longer: he claims it for himself and puts it on. Gollum reappears. He bites off Frodo's Ring finger. Celebrating wildly, Gollum loses his footing and falls into the Fire, taking the Ring with him. When the Ring is destroyed, Sauron loses his power. All he created collapses, the Nazgûl perish, Aragorn wins the battle of the Morannon, and the Eagles rescue Frodo and Sam from the ruin of Mount Doom. Aragorn is crowned King, and weds Arwen, Elrond's daughter. Théoden is buried; Éomer is crowned King of Rohan. His sister Éowyn is engaged to Faramir, now Steward of Gondor and Prince of Ithilien. Galadriel, Celeborn, and Gandalf say farewell to Treebeard, and to Aragorn. The four hobbits travel home, only to find it has been taken over by Saruman's men. Merry raises a rebellion and scours the Shire. Saruman reveals crimes that Wormtongue has done, causing Wormtongue to turn on Saruman and kill him in front of Bag End, Frodo's home. Wormtongue then is killed by hobbit archers. Merry and Pippin are celebrated as heroes. Sam marries Rosie Cotton and uses his gifts to heal the Shire. Frodo, broken by the quest, leaves a few years later, sailing from the Grey Havens over the Sea to find peace.

Extensive appendices outline more details of the history, cultures, genealogies, and languages that Tolkien imagined for the peoples of Middle-earth. In antiquarian style, they provide background details for the narrative, with much detail for Tolkien fans who want to know more about the stories.

=== Frame story ===
Tolkien presents The Lord of the Rings within a fictional frame story where he is not the original author, but merely the translator of part of an ancient document, the Red Book of Westmarch. That book is modelled on the real Red Book of Hergest, which similarly presents an older mythology. Various details of the frame story appear in the Prologue, its "Note on Shire Records", and in the Appendices, notably Appendix F. In this frame story, the Red Book is the purported source of Tolkien's other works relating to Middle-earth: The Hobbit, The Silmarillion, and The Adventures of Tom Bombadil.

== Concept and creation ==
=== Background ===
Although a major work in itself, The Lord of the Rings was only the last movement of a much older set of narratives Tolkien had worked on since 1917 encompassing The Silmarillion, in a process he described as mythopoeia. (Note: Tolkien created the word to define a different view of myth from C. S. Lewis's "lies breathed through silver", writing the poem "Mythopoeia" to present his argument; it was first published in Tree and Leaf in 1988.)

The Lord of the Rings started as a sequel to Tolkien's work The Hobbit, published in 1937. The popularity of The Hobbit led George Allen & Unwin, the publishers, to request a sequel. Tolkien warned them that he wrote quite slowly, and responded with several stories he had already developed. Having rejected his contemporary drafts for The Silmarillion, putting Roverandom on hold, and accepting Farmer Giles of Ham, Allen & Unwin continued to ask for more stories about hobbits.

=== Writing ===
Navigable diagram of Tolkien's legendarium. The Lord of the Rings began as a sequel to The Hobbit but gradually took in elements of the legendarium, the mythology summarized in The Silmarillion.

Persuaded by his publishers, he started "a new Hobbit" in December 1937. After several false starts, the story of the One Ring emerged. The idea for the first chapter ("A Long-Expected Party") arrived fully formed, although the reasons behind Bilbo's disappearance, the significance of the Ring, and the title The Lord of the Rings did not come until the spring of 1938. Originally, he planned to write a story in which Bilbo had used up all his treasure and was looking for another adventure to gain more; however, he remembered the Ring and its powers and thought that would be a better focus for the new work. As the story progressed, he brought in elements from The Silmarillion mythology.

Writing was slow because Tolkien had a full-time academic position, marked exams to bring in a little extra income, and wrote many drafts. (Note: Carpenter 2023, letter #17 to Stanley Unwin, 15 October 1937) Tolkien abandoned The Lord of the Rings during most of 1943 and only restarted it in April 1944, as a serial for his son Christopher Tolkien, who was sent chapters as they were written while he was serving in South Africa with the Royal Air Force. Tolkien made another major effort in 1946 and showed the manuscript to his publishers in 1947. The story was effectively finished the next year, but Tolkien did not complete the revision of earlier parts of the work until 1949. The original manuscripts, which total 9,250 pages, now reside in the J. R. R. Tolkien Collection at Marquette University.

=== Poetry ===
Unusually for 20th century novels, the prose narrative is supplemented throughout by over 60 pieces of poetry. These include verse and songs of many genres: for wandering, marching to war, drinking, and having a bath; narrating ancient myths, riddles, prophecies, and magical incantations; and of praise and lament (elegy). Some, such as riddles, charms, elegies, and narrating heroic actions are found in Old English poetry. Scholars have stated that the poetry is essential for the fiction to work aesthetically and thematically, as it adds information not given in the prose, and it brings out characters and their backgrounds. The poetry has been judged to be of high technical skill, reflected in Tolkien's prose; for instance, he wrote much of Tom Bombadil's speech in metre.

=== Illustrations ===
Tolkien's calligraphy of the Ring Verse was one of the few illustrations in the first edition. It is written in the Black Speech of Mordor using the Tengwar script.

Tolkien worked on the text using his maps of Middle-earth as a guide, to ensure the elements of the story fitted together in time and space. (Note: Carpenter 2023, letter #144 to Naomi Mitchison, 25 April 1954) He prepared a variety of types of illustration – maps, calligraphy, drawings, cover designs, even a facsimile painting of the Book of Mazarbul – but only the maps, the inscription on the Ring, and a drawing of the Doors of Durin and the inscription on Balin's tomb were included in the first edition. (Note: Carpenter 2023, letter #141 to Allen & Unwin, 9 October 1953)

The hardback editions sometimes had cover illustrations by Tolkien, (Note: See the lead images in the articles on the three separate volumes, e.g. The Fellowship of the Ring.) sometimes by other artists. According to The New York Times, Barbara Remington's cover designs for Ballantine's paperback editions "achieved mass-cult status in the 1960s, particularly on college campuses" across America.

=== Influences ===
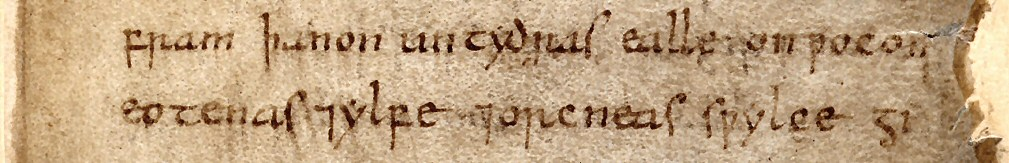
Beowulf's eotenas ond ylfe ond orcneas, "ogres and elves and devil-corpses" helped to inspire Tolkien to create the Orcs and Elves of Middle-earth.

Tolkien drew on a wide array of influences including language, (Note: Tolkien 1997, pp. 162–197 "English and Welsh") Christianity, (Note: Carpenter 2023, letter #142 to Robert Murray, S. J., 2 December 1953) mythology and Germanic heroic legend including the Norse Völsunga saga, archaeology, especially at the Temple of Nodens, ancient and modern literature, like Finnish 19th-century epic poetry The Kalevala by Elias Lönnrot, and personal experience. He was inspired primarily by his profession, philology; (Note: Carpenter 2023, letter #165 to Houghton Mifflin, 30 June 1955) his work centred on the study of Old English literature, especially Beowulf, and he acknowledged its importance to his writings. He was a gifted linguist, influenced by Celtic, Finnish, Slavic, and Greek language and mythology. Commentators have attempted to identify literary and topological antecedents for characters, places and events in Tolkien's writings; he acknowledged that he had enjoyed adventure stories by authors such as John Buchan and Rider Haggard. The Arts and Crafts polymath William Morris was a major influence, (Note: Carpenter 2023, letter #19 to Stanley Unwin, 31 December 1960) and Tolkien undoubtedly made use of some real place-names, such as Bag End, the name of his aunt's home. Tolkien stated, too, that he had been influenced by his childhood experiences of the English countryside of Worcestershire near Sarehole Mill, and its urbanization by the growth of Birmingham, (Note: Carpenter 2023, letter #178 to Allen & Unwin, 12 December 1955, and #303 to Nicholas Thomas, 6 May 1968) and his personal experience of fighting in the trenches of the First World War. Moreover, the militarization and industrialization inspired the character of Sauron and his forces. The Orcs represented the worst of it as workers that have been tortured and brutalized by the war and industry.

=== Themes ===
Scholars and critics have identified many themes in the book with its complex interlaced narrative, including a reversed quest, the struggle of good and evil, death and immortality, fate and free will, the addictive danger of power, and various aspects of Christianity such as the presence of three Christ figures, for prophet, priest, and king, as well as elements like hope and redemptive suffering. There is a common theme throughout the work of language, its sound, and its relationship to peoples and places, along with hints of providence in descriptions of weather and landscape. Out of these, Tolkien stated that the central theme is death and immortality. (Note: Carpenter 2023, letter #211 to Rhona Beare, 14 October 1958) To those who supposed that the book was an allegory of events in the 20th century, Tolkien replied in the foreword to the Second Edition that it was not, saying he preferred "history, true or feigned, with its varied applicability to the thought and experience of readers."

Some commentators have criticized the book for being a story about men for boys, with no significant women; for its setting in a purely rural world with no bearing on modern life in cities; for containing no sign of religion; or for racism. Other commentators have responded by noting that there are three powerful women in the book, Galadriel, Éowyn, and Arwen; that life, even in rural Hobbiton, is not idealized; that Christianity is a pervasive theme; and that Tolkien was sharply anti-racist both in peacetime and during the Second World War, while Middle-earth is evidently polycultural. Others have discussed the apparent or implicit sexuality in the book.

== Publication history ==
A dispute with his publisher, Allen & Unwin, led Tolkien to offer the work to William Collins in 1950. Tolkien intended The Silmarillion (itself largely unrevised at this point) to be published along with The Lord of the Rings, but Allen & Unwin was unwilling to do this. After Milton Waldman, his contact at Collins, expressed the belief that The Lord of the Rings itself "urgently wanted cutting", Tolkien eventually demanded that they publish the book in 1952. Collins did not; and so Tolkien wrote to Allen & Unwin, telling that he would have gladly considered the publication of any part of the stuff, fearing his work would never see the light of day.

For publication, the work was divided into three volumes to minimize any potential financial loss due to the high cost of type-setting and modest anticipated sales: The Fellowship of the Ring (Books I and II), The Two Towers (Books III and IV), and The Return of the King (Books V and VI, and six appendices). Delays in producing appendices, maps and especially an index led to the volumes being published later than originally hoped – on 29 July 1954, on 11 November 1954 and on 20 October 1955 respectively in the United Kingdom. In the United States, Houghton Mifflin published The Fellowship of the Ring on 21 October 1954, The Two Towers on 21 April 1955, and The Return of the King on 5 January 1956.

The Return of the King was especially delayed as Tolkien revised the ending and prepared appendices (some of which had to be left out because of space constraints). Tolkien did not like the title The Return of the King, believing it gave away too much of the storyline, but deferred to his publisher's preference. Tolkien wrote that the title The Two Towers "can be left ambiguous", (Note: Carpenter 2023, letter #140 to Rayner Unwin, 17 August 1953) but considered naming the two as Orthanc and Barad-dûr, Minas Tirith and Barad-dûr, or Orthanc and the Tower of Cirith Ungol. (Note: Carpenter 2023, letter #143 to Rayner Unwin, 22 January 1954) However, a month later he wrote a note published at the end of The Fellowship of the Ring and later drew a cover illustration, both of which identified the pair as Minas Morgul and Orthanc.

Tolkien was initially opposed to titles being given to each two-book volume, preferring instead the use of book titles: e.g. The Lord of the Rings: Vol. 1, The Ring Sets Out and The Ring Goes South; Vol. 2, The Treason of Isengard and The Ring Goes East; Vol. 3, The War of the Ring and The End of the Third Age. However, these individual book titles were dropped, and after pressure from his publishers, Tolkien suggested the volume titles: Vol. 1, The Shadow Grows; Vol. 2, The Ring in the Shadow; Vol. 3, The War of the Ring or The Return of the King.

Because the three-volume binding was so widely distributed, the work is often referred to as the Lord of the Rings "trilogy". In a letter to the poet W. H. Auden, who famously reviewed the final volume in 1956, Tolkien himself made use of the term "trilogy" for the work (Note: Carpenter 2023, letter #163 to W. H. Auden, 7 June 1955) though he did at other times consider this incorrect, as it was written and conceived as a single book. (Note: Carpenter 2023, letter #149 to Rayner Unwin, 9 September 1954) It is often called a novel; however, Tolkien objected to this term as he viewed it as a heroic romance. (Note: Carpenter 2023, letter #239 to Peter Szabo Szentmihalyi, draft, October 1971)

The books were published under a profit-sharing arrangement, whereby Tolkien would not receive an advance or royalties until the books had broken even, after which he would take a large share of the profits. It has ultimately become one of the best-selling novels ever written, with at least 50 million copies sold by 2003 and over 150 million copies sold by 2007. The work was published in the UK by Allen & Unwin until 1990, when the publisher and its assets were acquired by HarperCollins.

=== Editions and revisions ===
Barbara Remington's cover illustrations for the Ballantine paperback version "achieved mass-cult status" on American college campuses in the 1960s. They were parodied by Michael K. Frith's cover design for the 1969 Bored of the Rings.

In the early 1960s Donald A. Wollheim, science fiction editor of the paperback publisher Ace Books, claimed that The Lord of the Rings was not protected in the United States under American copyright law because Houghton Mifflin, the US hardcover publisher, had neglected to copyright the work in the United States. Then, in 1965, Ace Books proceeded to publish an edition, unauthorized by Tolkien and without paying royalties to him. Tolkien took issue with this and quickly notified his fans of this objection. Grass-roots pressure from these fans became so great that Ace Books withdrew their edition and made a nominal payment to Tolkien. (Note: Carpenter 2023, letters #270, #273 and #277)

Authorized editions followed from Ballantine Books and Houghton Mifflin to tremendous commercial success. Tolkien undertook various textual revisions to produce a version of the book that would be published with his consent and establish an unquestioned US copyright. This text became the Second Edition of The Lord of the Rings, published in 1965. The first Ballantine paperback edition was printed in October that year, selling a quarter of a million copies within ten months. On 4 September 1966, the novel debuted on The New York Times's Paperback Bestsellers list as number three, and was number one by 4 December, a position it held for eight weeks. Houghton Mifflin editions after 1994 consolidate variant revisions by Tolkien, and corrections supervised by Christopher Tolkien, which resulted, after some initial glitches, in a computer-based unified text.

In 2004, for the 50th Anniversary Edition, Wayne G. Hammond and Christina Scull, under supervision from Christopher Tolkien, studied and revised the text to eliminate as many errors and inconsistencies as possible, some of which had been introduced by well-meaning compositors of the first printing in 1954, and never been corrected. The 2005 edition of the book contained further corrections noticed by the editors and submitted by readers. Yet more corrections were made in the 60th Anniversary Edition in 2014. Several editions, including the 50th Anniversary Edition, print the whole work in one volume, with the result that pagination varies widely over the various editions.

=== Posthumous publication of drafts ===
From 1988 to 1992 Christopher Tolkien published the surviving drafts of The Lord of the Rings, chronicling and illuminating with commentary the stages of the text's development, in volumes 6–9 of his History of Middle-earth series. The four volumes carry the titles The Return of the Shadow, The Treason of Isengard, The War of the Ring, and Sauron Defeated.

=== Translations ===
The work has been translated, with varying degrees of success, into at least 38, and reportedly at least 70, languages. Tolkien, an expert in philology, examined many of these translations, and made comments on each that reflect both the translation process and his work. As he was unhappy with some choices made by early translators, such as the Swedish translation by Åke Ohlmarks, (Note: Carpenter 2023, letters #228 and #229 to Allen & Unwin, 24 January 1961 and 23 February 1961) Tolkien wrote a "Guide to the Names in The Lord of the Rings" (1967). Because The Lord of the Rings purports to be a translation of the fictitious Red Book of Westmarch, using the English language to represent the Westron of the "original", Tolkien suggested that translators attempt to capture the interplay between English and the invented nomenclature of the English work, and gave several examples along with general guidance.

== Reception ==
=== 1950s ===
Early reviews of the work were mixed. The initial review in the Sunday Telegraph described it as "among the greatest works of imaginative fiction of the twentieth century". The Sunday Times echoed this sentiment, stating that "the English-speaking world is divided into those who have read The Lord of the Rings and The Hobbit and those who are going to read them." The New York Herald Tribune appeared to predict the books' popularity, writing in its review that they were "destined to outlast our time". W. H. Auden, a former pupil of Tolkien's and an admirer of his writings, regarded The Lord of the Rings as a "masterpiece", further stating that in some cases it outdid the achievement of John Milton's Paradise Lost. Kenneth F. Slater wrote in Nebula Science Fiction, April 1955, "... if you don't read it, you have missed one of the finest books of its type ever to appear". On the other hand, in 1955, the Scottish poet Edwin Muir attacked The Return of the King, writing that "All the characters are boys masquerading as adult heroes ... and will never come to puberty ... Hardly one of them knows anything about women", causing Tolkien to complain angrily to his publisher. In 1956, the literary critic Edmund Wilson wrote a review entitled "Oo, Those Awful Orcs!", calling Tolkien's work "juvenile trash", and saying "Dr. Tolkien has little skill at narrative and no instinct for literary form."

Within Tolkien's literary group, The Inklings, the work had a mixed reception. Hugo Dyson complained loudly at its readings, (Note: Dyson's actual comment, bowdlerized in the TV version, was "Not another fucking Elf!" Grovier, Kelly (29 April 2007). "In the Name of the Father". The Observer. Archived from the original on 2 October 2013.) whereas C. S. Lewis had very different feelings, writing, "here are beauties which pierce like swords or burn like cold iron. Here is a book which will break your heart." Lewis observed that the writing is rich, in that some of the 'good' characters have darker sides, and likewise some of the villains have "good impulses". Despite the mixed reviews and the lack of a paperback until the 1960s, The Lord of the Rings initially sold well in hardback.

=== Later ===
Judith Shulevitz, writing in The New York Times, criticized the "pedantry" of Tolkien's literary style, saying that he "formulated a high-minded belief in the importance of his mission as a literary preservationist, which turns out to be death to literature itself". The critic Richard Jenkyns, writing in The New Republic, criticized the work for a lack of psychological depth. Both the characters and the work itself were, according to Jenkyns, "anemic, and lacking in fibre". The science fiction author David Brin interprets the work as holding unquestioning devotion to a traditional hierarchical social structure. In his essay "Epic Pooh", fantasy author Michael Moorcock critiques the world-view displayed by the book as deeply conservative, in both the "paternalism" of the narrative voice and the power structures in the narrative. Tom Shippey, like Tolkien an English philologist, notes the wide gulf between Tolkien's supporters, both popular and academic, and his literary detractors, and attempts to explain in detail both why the literary establishment disliked The Lord of the Rings, and the work's subtlety, themes, and merits, including the impression of depth that it conveys. The scholar of humanities Brian Rosebury analysed Tolkien's prose style in detail, showing that it was generally quite plain, varying to suit the voices of the different characters, and rising to a heroic register for special moments. The critic Patrick Curry cited the work's first publisher, Rayner Unwin's "pithy and accurate" assessment of the novel: "a very great book in its own curious way".

=== Awards ===
In 1957, The Lord of the Rings was awarded the International Fantasy Award. Despite its numerous detractors, the publication of the Ace Books and Ballantine paperbacks helped The Lord of the Rings become immensely popular in the United States in the 1960s. The book has remained so ever since, ranking as the most popular works of fiction of the twentieth century, judged by all of three different measures: sales, library borrowings, and reader surveys. In the 2003 "Big Read" survey conducted in Britain by the BBC, The Lord of the Rings was found to be the "Nation's best-loved book". In similar 2004 polls both Germany and Australia chose The Lord of the Rings as their favourite book. In a 1999 poll of Amazon.com customers, The Lord of the Rings was judged to be their favourite "book of the millennium". In 2019, the BBC News listed The Lord of the Rings on its list of the "100 most inspiring novels".

== Adaptations ==
The Lord of the Rings has been adapted into various media, including radio, stage, motion pictures, and videogames.

=== Radio ===
The book has been adapted for radio four times. In 1955 and 1956, the BBC broadcast The Lord of the Rings, a 13-part radio adaptation of the story. In the 1960s radio station WBAI produced a short radio adaptation. A 1979 dramatization of The Lord of the Rings was broadcast in the United States and subsequently issued on tape and CD. In 1981, the BBC broadcast The Lord of the Rings, a new dramatization in 26 half-hour instalments.

=== Motion pictures ===
A variety of filmmakers considered adapting Tolkien's book, among them Stanley Kubrick, who thought it unfilmable, Michelangelo Antonioni, Jim Henson, Heinz Edelmann, and John Boorman. A Swedish live action television film, Sagan om ringen, was broadcast in 1971. In 1978, Ralph Bakshi made an animated film version covering The Fellowship of the Ring and part of The Two Towers, to mixed reviews. In 1980, Rankin/Bass released an animated TV special based on the closing chapters of The Return of the King, gaining mixed reviews. The 1991 Soviet Union live-action adaptation of The Fellowship of the Ring, Khraniteli, was aired once and thought lost, but was rediscovered and republished on the Web. It includes Tom Bombadil and the Barrow-wight, omitted from Jackson's version. In Finland, a live action television miniseries, Hobitit, was broadcast in 1993 based on The Lord of the Rings, with a flashback to Bilbo's encounter with Gollum in The Hobbit.

A far more successful adaptation was Peter Jackson's live action The Lord of the Rings film trilogy, produced by New Line Cinema and released in three instalments as The Lord of the Rings: The Fellowship of the Ring (2001), The Lord of the Rings: The Two Towers (2002), and The Lord of the Rings: The Return of the King (2003). All three parts won multiple Academy Awards, including consecutive Best Picture nominations. The final instalment of this trilogy was the second film to break the one-billion-dollar barrier and won a total of 11 Oscars (something only two other films in history, Ben-Hur and Titanic, have accomplished), including Best Picture, Best Director and Best Adapted Screenplay. Commentators including Tolkien scholars, literary critics and film critics are divided on how faithfully Jackson adapted Tolkien's work, or whether a film version is inevitably different, and if so the reasons for any changes, and the effectiveness of the result.

The Hunt for Gollum, a 2009 film by Chris Bouchard, and the 2009 Born of Hope, written by Paula DiSante and directed by Kate Madison, are fan films based on details in the appendices of The Lord of the Rings.

In 2023, Warner Bros. Discovery began making a series of films set in Middle-earth, produced along with New Line Cinema and Freemode. The first was The Lord of the Rings: The War of the Rohirrim, an anime written by Jeffrey Addiss, Will Matthews and Philippa Boyens, directed by Kenji Kamiyama and released in December 2024. It was based on the story of the legendary Rohan king Helm Hammerhand.

=== Television ===
From September 2022, Amazon has been presenting a multi-season television series of stories, The Lord of the Rings: The Rings of Power. It is set at the beginning of the Second Age, long before the time of The Lord of the Rings, based on materials in the novel's appendices.

=== Audiobooks ===
In 1990, Recorded Books published an audio version of The Lord of the Rings, read by the British actor Rob Inglis. A large-scale musical theatre adaptation, The Lord of the Rings, was first staged in Toronto, Ontario, Canada in 2006 and opened in London in June 2007; it was a commercial failure.

In 2013, the artist Phil Dragash recorded the whole of the book, using the score from Peter Jackson's movies.

During the COVID-19 lockdown, Andy Serkis read the entire book of The Hobbit online to raise money for charity. He then recorded the work again as an audiobook. The cover art was done by Alan Lee. In 2021, Serkis recorded The Lord of the Rings novels.

== Legacy ==
=== Influence on fantasy ===
The enormous popularity of Tolkien's work expanded the demand for fantasy. Largely thanks to The Lord of the Rings, the genre flowered throughout the 1960s and enjoys popularity to the present day. The opus has spawned many imitations, such as The Sword of Shannara, which Lin Carter called "the single most cold-blooded, complete rip-off of another book that I have ever read", as well as alternative interpretations of the story, such as The Last Ringbearer. The Legend of Zelda, which popularized the action-adventure game genre in the 1980s, was inspired by The Lord of the Rings among other fantasy books. Dungeons & Dragons, which popularized the role-playing game genre in the 1970s, features several races from The Lord of the Rings, including halflings (hobbits), elves, dwarves, half-elves, orcs, and dragons. However, Gary Gygax, the lead designer of the game, stated that he included these elements as a marketing move to draw on the popularity the work enjoyed at the time he was developing the game. Because Dungeons & Dragons has gone on to influence many popular games, especially role-playing video games, the influence of The Lord of the Rings extends to many of them, with titles such as Dragon Quest, EverQuest, the Warcraft series, and The Elder Scrolls series of games as well as video games set in Middle-earth itself.

=== Music ===
In 1965, the composer and songwriter Donald Swann, best known for his collaboration with Michael Flanders as Flanders & Swann, set six poems from The Lord of the Rings and one from The Adventures of Tom Bombadil ("Errantry") to music. When Swann met with Tolkien to play the songs for his approval, Tolkien suggested for "Namárië" (Galadriel's lament) a setting reminiscent of plain chant, which Swann accepted. The songs were published in 1967 as The Road Goes Ever On: A Song Cycle, and a recording of the songs performed by singer William Elvin with Swann on piano was issued that same year by Caedmon Records as Poems and Songs of Middle Earth.

Rock bands of the 1970s were musically and lyrically inspired by the fantasy-embracing counter-culture of the time. The British rock band Led Zeppelin recorded several songs that contain explicit references to The Lord of the Rings, such as mentioning Gollum and Mordor in "Ramble On", the Misty Mountains in "Misty Mountain Hop", and Ringwraiths in "The Battle of Evermore". In 1970, the Swedish musician Bo Hansson released an instrumental concept album entitled Sagan om ringen ("The Saga of the Ring", the title of the Swedish translation at the time). The album was subsequently released internationally as Music Inspired by Lord of the Rings in 1972. From the 1980s onwards, many heavy metal acts have been influenced by Tolkien.

In 1988, the Dutch composer and trombonist Johan de Meij completed his Symphony No. 1 "The Lord of the Rings". It had 5 movements, titled "Gandalf", "Lothlórien", "Gollum", "Journey in the Dark", and "Hobbits". The 1991 album Shepherd Moons by the Irish musician Enya contains an instrumental titled "Lothlórien", in reference to the home of the wood-elves.

=== Impact on popular culture ===
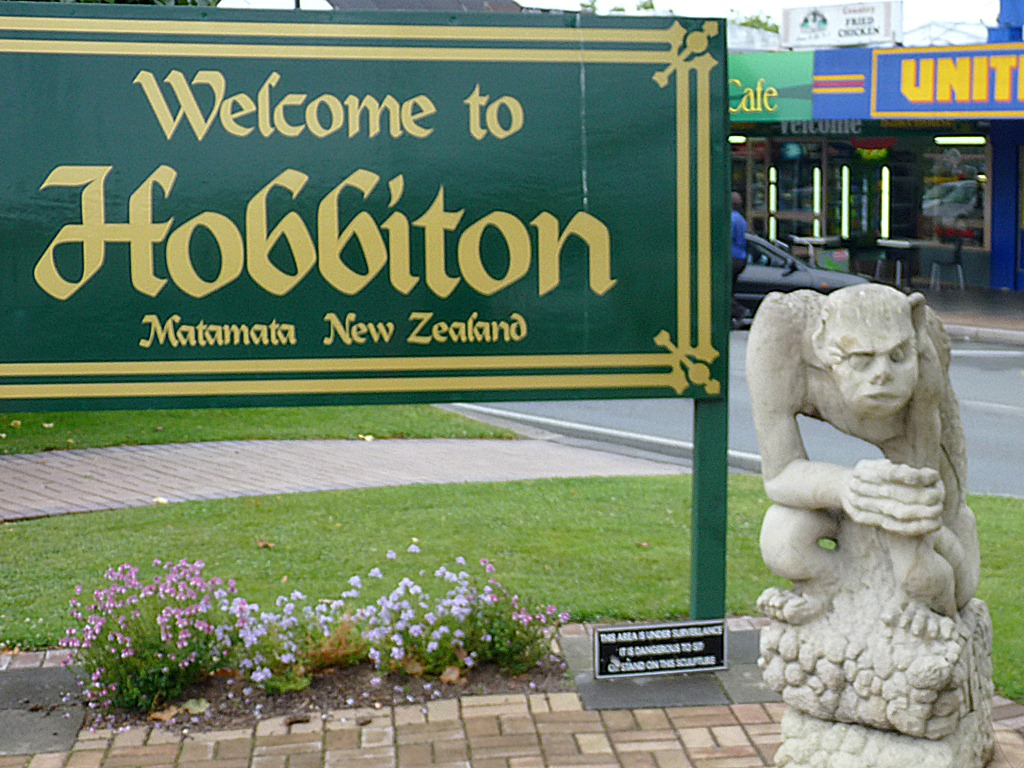
"Welcome to Hobbiton" sign in Matamata, New Zealand, where Peter Jackson's film version was shot

The Lord of the Rings has had a profound and wide-ranging impact on popular culture, beginning with its publication in the 1950s, but especially during the 1960s and 1970s, when young people embraced it as a countercultural saga. "Frodo Lives!" and "Gandalf for President" were two phrases popular among United States Tolkien fans during this time. Its impact is such that the words "Tolkienian" and "Tolkienesque" have entered the Oxford English Dictionary, and many of his fantasy terms, formerly little-known in English, such as "Orc" and "Warg", have become widespread in that domain. Among its effects are numerous parodies, especially Harvard Lampoon's Bored of the Rings, which has had the distinction of remaining continuously in print from its publication in 1969, and of being translated into at least 11 languages.

In 1969, Tolkien sold the merchandising rights to The Lord of the Rings and The Hobbit to United Artists under an agreement stipulating a lump sum payment of £10,000 (equivalent to £145,000 in 2025) plus a 7.5% royalty after costs, payable to Allen & Unwin and the author. In 1976, three years after the author's death, United Artists sold the rights to Saul Zaentz Company, who now trade as Tolkien Enterprises. Since then all "authorised" merchandise has been signed off by Tolkien Enterprises, although the intellectual property rights of the specific likenesses of characters and other imagery from various adaptations is generally held by the adaptors.

Outside commercial exploitation from adaptations, from the late 1960s onwards there has been an increasing variety of original licensed merchandise, with posters and calendars created by illustrators such as Barbara Remington.

The work was named Britain's best novel of all time in the BBC's The Big Read. In 2015, the BBC ranked The Lord of the Rings 26th on its list of the 100 greatest British novels. It was included in Le Monde's list of "100 Books of the Century".

== Sources ==
- Carpenter, Humphrey (1977). J. R. R. Tolkien: A Biography. New York: Ballantine Books. ISBN 978-0-04-928037-3.
- Carpenter, Humphrey, ed. (2023) [1981]. The Letters of J. R. R. Tolkien: Revised and Expanded Edition. New York: HarperCollins. ISBN 978-0-35-865298-4.
- Drout, Michael D. C. (2006). The J. R. R. Tolkien Encyclopedia. Routledge. ISBN 978-0-415-96942-0.
- Hammond, Wayne G.; Scull, Christina (2005). The Lord of the Rings: A Reader's Companion. Houghton Mifflin Co. ISBN 978-0-00-720907-1.
- Tolkien, J. R. R. (1954). The Two Towers. The Lord of the Rings. Boston: Houghton Mifflin. OCLC 1042159111.
- Tolkien, Christopher (ed.) (1988–1992). The History of The Lord of the Rings, 4 vols.
- Tolkien, J. R. R. (1997). The Monsters and the Critics, and Other Essays. HarperCollins. ISBN 978-0-261-10263-7.
