= Roland Adlerberth =

Swedish translator and writer (1923–1993)

Roland Adlerberth (21 September 1923 – 31 July 1993) was a Swedish translator and writer.

Adlerberth got his bachelor's degree in 1947 from the University of Gothenburg. In the years of 1949–1958 he was a library assistant at the Dickson Public Library and thereafter at the town library of Köping.

In the 1950s Adlerberth became a co-founder of one of the first science fiction clubs in Sweden, named Futura.

He published year 1965 the book Människan i blickpunkten: memoarer och biografier: ett urval ("Man in Focus: memoirs and biographies: a selection").

In the 1960s Adlerberth summarized the professional literature of his time in the Swedish yearbook Tidens kalender. Year 1977 he received a literature prize from the Swedish Crime Writers' Academy for his translations.

Adlerberth was a co-worker at magazines such as Dast-Magazine, Jules Verne-Magasinet, and Häpna! He was also a member of the Swedish government's Cultural Council Committee for Magazines and Journals.

Adlerberth was a translator of literature related to science fiction, thriller, adventure and crime.
