= Walter Renneisen =

German actor (born 1940)

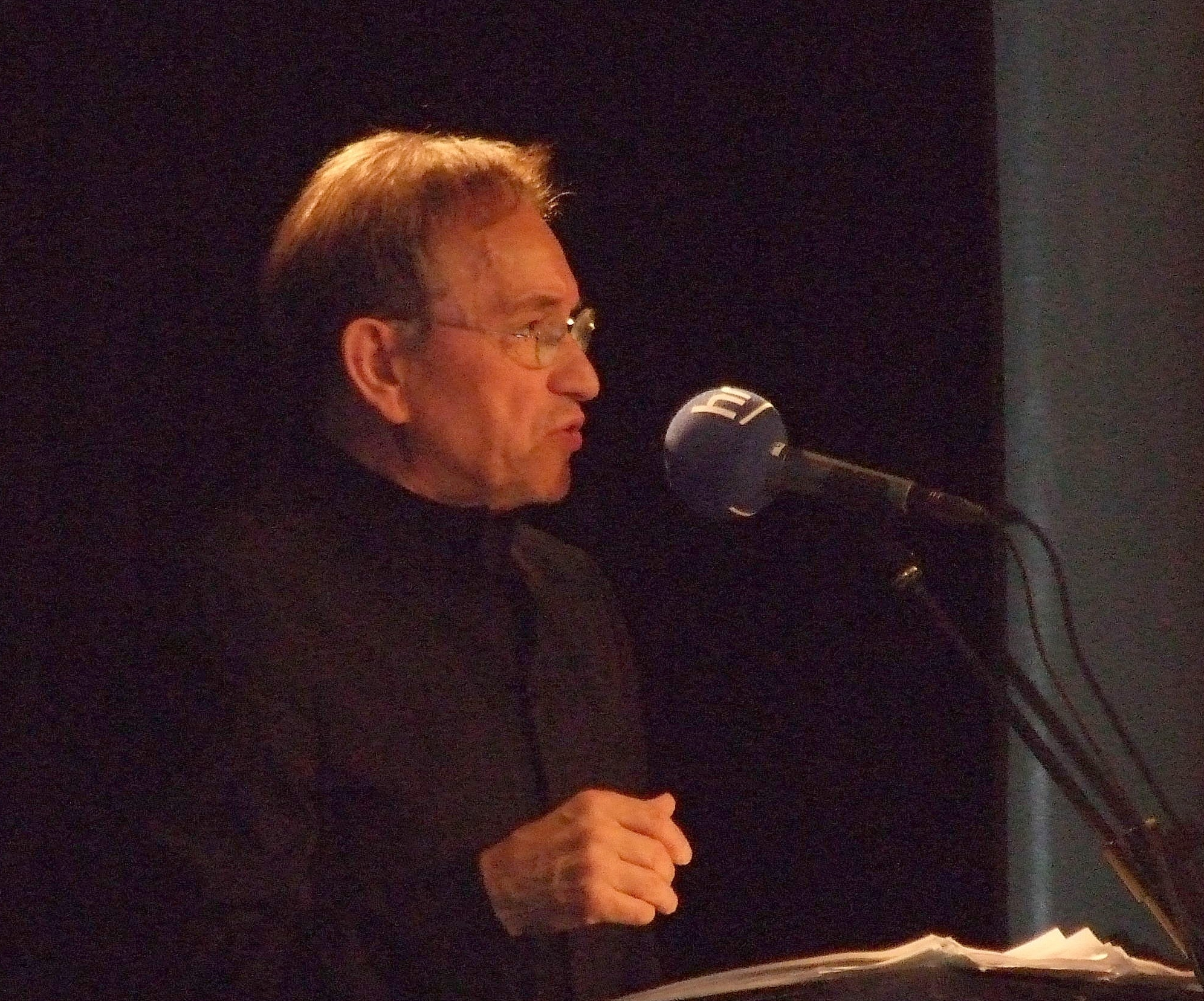
- Renneisen in 2007
- Born: 3 March 1940 (age 85); Mainz, Rhineland-Palatinate, Germany
- Occupations: Actor; director
- Years active: 1970–present
- Relatives: Alex Kingston (niece)
- Website: www.walter-renneisen.de

Walter Renneisen (born 3 March 1940) is a German actor. After engagements at the Schauspiel Bochum, Theater Dortmund and Staatstheater Darmstadt, he has worked freelance. He founded a touring theatre company in 1977.

== Career ==
Born in Mainz, Renneisen grew up on a farm in Raunheim, Hesse, Germany. He attended the Immanuel Kant School in Rüsselsheim. He played as a percussionist in a band in Frankfurt clubs. After his Abitur, he studied theatre, German and philosophy at the universities of Cologne and Mainz from 1960 to 1964. He then studied at the Westfälische Schauspielschule Bochum. After graduation, he was engaged at the Schauspiel Bochum, Theater Dortmund and Staatstheater Darmstadt, among others. In Darmstadt, he was inspired by Rudolf Sellner.

He has worked freelance since 1977, for the Staatstheater Stuttgart, Theater Bonn and Deutsches Theater Göttingen, among others, and also for several open-air theatres. He has frequently played in TV series such as Tatort, Der Alte, Derrick, Ein Fall für zwei and Siska. His roles have included Mephisto in Goethe's Urfaust, Cyrano in Pavel Kohout's Der arme Cyrano, the title role in Brecht's Der aufhaltsame Aufstieg des Herrn Arturo Ui, and Salieri in Shaffer's Amadeus. In 1995, he began to stage his own theatre productions on tour, presenting for example Patrick Süßkind's Der Kontrabaß, Die Sternstunde des Josef Bieder and Deutschland, Deine Hessen. Renneisen has performed the play Der Kontrabaß for more than 30 years. He has spoken in more than 800 radio plays.

In 2016, he received the Rheingau Musik Preis for his life's work on stage and TV. In 2018, he appeared at the Rheingau Musik Festival in a show titled Aus dem Leben eines Taugenichts, borrowing the title of the novella by Eichendorff (in English given as Memoirs of a Good-for-Nothing) and presenting Renneisen's life including 50 years on stage, in literature and in music.

Renneisen is married, has two daughters and two sons, and lives in Bensheim. He is the maternal uncle of English actress Alex Kingston.

== Awards ==
Renneisen has received several awards, including:

- 1985 Hörspielpreis der Kriegsblinden
- 1995 Adolf-Grimme-Preis
- 2004 Hessian Order of Merit
- 2005 Sonderpreis of INTHEGA
- 2014 Order of Merit of the Federal Republic of Germany
- 2016 Rheingau Musikpreis
- 2016 Ehrenspange of Bensheim
