= Drúedain =

Fictional race created by Tolkien

In-universe information
- Other names: Woses, Drughu, Oghor-hai, Púkel-men, Wild men
- Creation date: First Age
- Home world: Middle-earth
- Base of operations: Drúadan Forest
- Language: Drûg
- Leader: Ghân-buri-Ghân

The Drúedain are a fictional race of Men, living in the Drúadan Forest, in the Middle-earth legendarium created by J. R. R. Tolkien. They were counted among the Edain who made their way into Beleriand in the First Age, and were friendly to the Elves. In The Lord of the Rings, they assist the Riders of Rohan to avoid ambush on the way to the Battle of the Pelennor Fields.

The Drúedain are based on the mythological woodwoses, the wild men of the woods of Britain and Europe; the Riders of Rohan indeed call them woses. (Note: Tolkien 1955, Book 5, ch. 5, "The Ride of the Rohirrim")

== Names and etymology ==
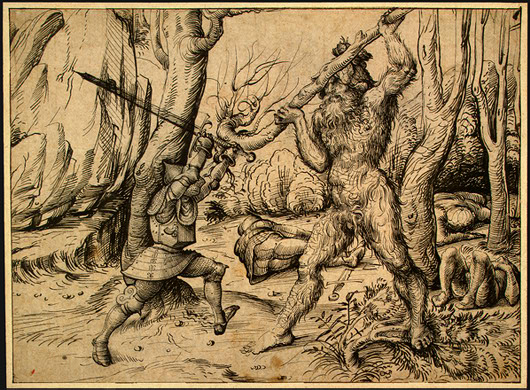
A fight with a woodwose: The Fight in the Forest by Hans Burgkmair, c. 1500

Within Tolkien's fiction, the Drúedain call themselves Drughu. When the Drúedain settled in Beleriand, the Sindarin Elves adapted this to Drû (plurals Drúin, Drúath) and later added the suffix -adan "man", resulting in the usual Sindarin form Drúadan (plural Drúedain). (Note: Tolkien 1980, "The Drúedain") Tolkien also used the form Drûg, with a regular English plural Drûgs. Drughu became Rú in Quenya, with the later suffixed form Rúatan (plural Rúatani). The Orcs called the Drúedain Oghor-hai. John S. Ryan, writing in Mallorn, notes that Tolkien also uses the forms "Drúadan Forest" (the home of the Woses) and "Drúwaith-Iaur" (the Dru-folk's ancient wilderness).

The word used for the Drúedain by the Rohirrim during the Third Age is represented by Tolkien as Púkel-men. (Note: Tolkien 1955, Book 5, ch. 3, "The Muster of Rohan".) This includes the Old English word pūcel "goblin, troll", which survives in Shakespeare's Puck in A Midsummer Night's Dream, and in two forms in Kipling's Puck of Pook's Hill. Ryan adds that the word survives in English placenames such as Puckshot in Surrey, Pock Field in Cumberland, Puxton, Puckeridge, Pokesdown, Pockford, Pucknall, and perhaps Pucklechurch. Ryan suggests that the Púkel-men may derive from a combination of "Proto-Celts, Druid-figures, or ... roadside fertility deities". Ryan notes Christopher Tolkien's statement that the name Púkel-men is "also used as a general equivalent to Drúedain".

In Westron, the Common Tongue of western Middle-earth, the Drúedain were called the Wild Men, or the [Wood-]Woses:

You hear the Woses, the Wild Men of the Woods: thus they talk together from afar. They still haunt Druadan Forest, it is said. Remnants of an older time they be, living few and secretly, wild and wary as the beasts.

The Tolkien scholar Tom Shippey, a philologist like Tolkien, notes that the office at Leeds University which both men used (at different times), is near Woodhouse Moor, which, as "would not have escaped Tolkien", is a modern misspelling of Wood-Wose, Old English wudu-wāsa. Clark Hall renders this word as "faun, satyr".

== Description ==
The Drúedain somewhat resemble Dwarves in stature and endurance; they are stumpy, clumsy-limbed with short, thick legs, and fat, "gnarled" arms, broad chests, fat bellies, and heavy buttocks. According to the Elves and other Men, they had "unlovely faces": wide, flat, and expressionless with deep-set black eyes that glowed red when angered. They had "horny" brows, flat noses, wide mouths, and sparse, lank hair. They had no hair lower than the eyebrows, except for a few men who had a tail of black hair on the chin. They were short-lived and had a deep hatred of Orcs. They had certain magical powers and sat still in meditation for long periods.

== History ==
The Drûgs were the first to migrate from Hildórien, the land where the race of Men awoke in the east of Middle-earth. Initially they headed south, into Harad, but then they turned north-west, becoming the first Men to cross the great river Anduin. (Note: Tolkien 1980, part 4 ch. 1) Many of them settled in the White Mountains, where they were the first people.

Some of the Drúedain continued north-west, settling in Beleriand. A band of them lived there in the First Age, in the forest of Brethil among the Second House of Men, the Haladin, whence the Elves came to know and love them. Aghan the Drûg is a protagonist in "The Faithful Stone", a short story set in Beleriand in the First Age.

The Drúedain enabled the Rohirrim to reach the Battle of the Pelennor Fields (blue arrow 3) by way of their forest (off map), avoiding the Orcs blocking the road (red arrow 1b).

Although a number of the Drúedain came with the Edain to Númenor, they had left or died out before the Akallabêth, as had the Púkel-men of Dunharrow. At the end of the Third Age the Drûgs still lived in the Drúadan Forest of the White Mountains, and on the long cape of Andrast west of Gondor. The region north of Andrast was still known as Drúwaith Iaur, or "Old Drûg land".

The term Púkel-men used by the Rohirrim was also applied to the statues constructed by the Drúedain to guard important places and homes; some evidently had the power to come to life. (Note: Tolkien 1980, "The Drúedain: The Faithful Stone") Because of their ugly appearance and frightening statues the Drúedain were feared and loathed by other Men of the region; they were considered little better than Orcs, and there was much enmity between those peoples.

Nevertheless, the Drúedain of Ghân-buri-Ghân's clan came to the aid of the Rohirrim during the War of the Ring. A large company of Orcs had been sent to the Drúadan Forest to waylay the host of Rohan as it made its way to the aid of Gondor. It was the "woodcrafty beyond compare" Drúedain who held off the Orcs with poisoned arrows whilst they guided the Rohirrim through the forest by secret paths. Without their help the Rohirrim would not have arrived at the Battle of the Pelennor Fields, and Sauron would likely have triumphed. This action earned the Drúedain the respect of other Men, and King Elessar granted them the Drúadan Forest "forever" in thanks.

== Analysis ==
Ghân-buri-Ghân is perceived as a "leftover," a prehistoric type of human surviving in the modern world. Like the rest of his people, Ghân has a flat face, dark eyes, and wears only a grass skirt. He is seen as a good man with a kind of primitive nobility, a classic example of the noble savage. He is by no means stupid, and he "refuses to be patronized."

The medievalist and Tolkien scholar Verlyn Flieger comments that the Wild Man "is infantile". Ghân-Buri-Ghân talks "like a Hollywood Tarzan" using short broken phrases like "Wild Men live here before Stone-houses" and "kill orc-folk". She compares him with the "Wild Hobbit" Gollum, who is psychotic, haunted by voices, and who uses "baby-talk", like "cruel little hobbitses": in her view, the Wild Man is "evolutionarily regressive", whereas Gollum is "psychologically regressive".

== Adaptations ==
Ghân-buri-Ghân is featured in the promotional expansion card set of The Lord of the Rings Trading Card Game and in the Lord of the Rings board game. The image for the latter was designed by the Tolkien illustrator and concept designer John Howe.
