= The Return of the King =

1955 part of novel by J. R. R. Tolkien

- First edition, with Tolkien's artwork
- Author: J. R. R. Tolkien
- Language: English
- Series: The Lord of the Rings
- Genre: Fantasy
- Set in: Middle-earth
- Publisher: George Allen & Unwin
- Publication date: 20 October 1955
- Publication place: United Kingdom
- Pages: 416 (first edition)
- OCLC: 933993
- Dewey Decimal: 823.914
- LC Class: PR6039.O32 L6 1954, v.3
- Preceded by: The Two Towers

The Return of the King is the third and final volume of J. R. R. Tolkien's The Lord of the Rings, following The Fellowship of the Ring and The Two Towers. It was published in 1955. The story begins in the kingdom of Gondor, which is soon to be attacked by the Dark Lord Sauron.

The volume was praised by literary figures including W. H. Auden, Anthony Price, and Michael Straight, but attacked by Edwin Muir, who had praised The Fellowship of the Ring.

The chapter "The Scouring of the Shire", and a chapter-length narrative in the appendices, "The Tale of Aragorn and Arwen", have attracted discussion by scholars and critics. "The Scouring of the Shire" has been called the most important chapter in the whole novel, providing in its internal quest to restore the Shire a counterbalance to the main quest to destroy the Ring. Commentators have read into it a variety of contemporary political allusions including a satire of socialism and a strand of environmentalism. Tolkien described "The Tale of Aragorn and Arwen" as essential to the plot of the novel. It covers events both before and after the main narrative, and differs from it in not being from the hobbits' point of view. Scholars have discussed the tale's themes including love and death, Tolkien's balance between open Christianity and treating the characters as pagan; and the fact that having the tale as an appendix deprives the main story of much of its love-interest.

== Title and publication ==
Tolkien conceived of The Lord of the Rings as a single work comprising six "books" plus extensive appendices. In 1953, he proposed titles for the six books to his publisher, Rayner Unwin; Book Five was to be The War of the Ring, while Book Six was to be The End of the Third Age. These titles were eventually used in the (2000) Millennium edition. Unwin however split the work into three volumes, publishing the fifth and sixth books with the appendices into the final volume with the title The Return of the King. Tolkien felt the chosen title revealed too much of the story, and indicated that he preferred The War of the Ring as a title for the volume.

The Return of the King was in the end published as the third and final volume of The Lord of the Rings, on 20 October 1955 in the UK.

== Contents ==
Some editions of the volume contain a synopsis for readers who have not read the earlier volumes. The body of the volume consists of books five and six. Book six has variously been titled The Return of the King (clashing with the title of the third volume) and The End of the Third Age, though in many editions the Books are untitled. The volume ends with a set of appendices and an index, varying in different editions.

=== Book V: The War of the Ring ===
Sauron sends a great army against Gondor. Gandalf arrives at Minas Tirith to warn Denethor of the attack, while Théoden musters the Rohirrim to ride to Gondor's aid. Minas Tirith is besieged; the Lord of the Nazgûl uses a spell-wound battering ram to destroy the city's gates. Denethor, deceived by Sauron, falls into despair. He burns himself alive on a pyre; Pippin and Gandalf rescue his son Faramir from the same fate.

Aragorn, accompanied by Legolas, Gimli, and the Rangers of the North, takes the Paths of the Dead to recruit the Dead Men of Dunharrow, oathbreakers who are bound by an ancient curse which denies them rest until they fulfil their oath to fight for the King of Gondor. Aragorn unleashes the Army of the Dead on the Corsairs of Umbar invading southern Gondor. With that threat eliminated, Aragorn uses the Corsairs' ships to transport the men of southern Gondor up the Anduin, reaching Minas Tirith just in time to turn the tide of battle. Théoden's niece Éowyn, who joined the army in disguise, kills the Lord of the Nazgûl with help from Merry; both are wounded. Together, Gondor and Rohan defeat Sauron's army in the Battle of the Pelennor Fields, though at great cost; Théoden is among the dead.

Aragorn enters Minas Tirith and heals Faramir, Éowyn, and Merry. He leads an army of men from Gondor and Rohan, marching through Ithilien to the Black Gate to distract Sauron from his true danger. At the Battle of the Morannon, his army is vastly outnumbered.

=== Book VI: The End of the Third Age ===
Meanwhile, Sam rescues Frodo from the tower of Cirith Ungol. They set out across Mordor. When they reach the edge of the Cracks of Doom, Frodo cannot resist the Ring any longer. He claims it for himself and puts it on. Gollum, who has been stalking them, suddenly reappears. He struggles with Frodo and bites off Frodo's finger with the Ring still on it. Celebrating wildly, Gollum loses his footing and falls into the Fire, taking the Ring with him. When the Ring is destroyed, Sauron loses his power forever. All he created collapses, the Nazgûl perish, and his armies are thrown into such disarray that Aragorn's forces emerge victorious.

Aragorn is crowned King of Arnor and Gondor, and weds Arwen, daughter of Elrond. Théoden is buried and Éomer is crowned King of Rohan. His sister Éowyn is engaged to marry Faramir, now Steward of Gondor and Prince of Ithilien. Galadriel, Celeborn, and Gandalf meet and say farewell to Treebeard, and to Aragorn.

The four hobbits make their way back to the Shire, only to find that it has been taken over by men directed by "Sharkey" (whom they later discover to be Saruman). The hobbits, led by Merry, raise a rebellion and scour the Shire of Sharkey's evil. Gríma Wormtongue turns on Saruman and kills him in front of Bag End, Frodo's home. He is killed in turn by hobbit archers. Merry and Pippin are celebrated as heroes. Sam marries Rosie Cotton and uses his gifts from Galadriel to help heal the Shire. But Frodo is still wounded in body and spirit, having borne the Ring for so long. A few years later, in the company of Bilbo and Gandalf, Frodo sails from the Grey Havens west over the Sea to the Undying Lands to find peace. Sam returns home to his family, saying "well, I'm back."

=== Appendices ===
The appendices outline more details of the history, cultures, genealogies, and languages that Tolkien imagined for the peoples of Middle-earth. They provide background details for the narrative, with much detail for Tolkien fans who want to know more about the stories.

==== "Annals of the Kings and Rulers" ====
Provides extensive background to the larger world of Middle-earth, with brief overviews of the events of the first two Ages of the world, and then more detailed histories of the nations of Men in Gondor and Rohan, as well as a history of the royal Dwarvish line of Durin during the Third Age.

The embedded "Tale of Aragorn and Arwen" tells how it happened that an immortal elf came to marry a man, as told in the main story, which Arwen's ancestor Lúthien had done in the First Age, giving up her immortality.

==== "The Tale of Years" (Chronology of the Westlands) ====
Provides a timeline of events throughout the series, and ancient events affecting the narrative, and in lesser detail, it gives the stories' context in the fictional chronology of the larger mythology.

It tells that Sam gives his daughter Elanor the fictional Red Book of Westmarch – which contains the autobiographical stories of Bilbo's adventures at the opening of the war, and Frodo's role in the full-on War of the Ring, and serves as Tolkien's source for The Hobbit and The Lord of the Rings (with Tolkien representing himself as a translator, rather than an epic novelist). It says that there was "a tradition" that after handing over the book, Sam crossed west over the sea himself, the last of the ring-bearers; and that some years later, after the deaths of Aragorn and Arwen, Legolas and Gimli also sailed together "over Sea".

==== "Family Trees" (Hobbits) ====
Gives hobbit genealogies – not only for Bilbo and Frodo's Baggins family, but also their relations the Tooks and Brandybucks, which connect them to Pippin and Merry.

==== "Calendars" ====
Describes some of the calendars used by the characters in the story, and explains that the Roman month names in the text are "translations" of the names in the hobbits' calendar. (Tolkien was a linguist, and provided Germanic-sounding names for the hobbit calendar by extrapolating names of German and Old English months forward to what he thought they might have become if all were still used in modern English, as Yule and Easter are.)

==== "Writing and Spelling" ====
Describes dwarves' runes and the elvish runes used by the other peoples of Middle-earth; the names of the runes and letters incidentally give some information about dwarvish and elvish languages.

==== "Languages and Peoples of the Third Age" and "On Translation" ====
Presented as two sections. In addition to outlines of the various languages in current use during the narrative, and mentioned or seen in the story, it discusses hobbits' names at length. It sorts out names which Tolkien pretended to have translated into English, and names which he said he had left in their original form (since they had no meaning in hobbits' everyday language).

== Reception ==
=== Of the volume ===
In a review for The New York Times, the poet W. H. Auden praised The Return of the King and found The Lord of the Rings a "masterpiece of the genre". The science fiction author and critic Anthony Boucher, in a review for The Magazine of Fantasy & Science Fiction, praised the volume as "a masterly narration of tremendous and terrible climactic events", but wrote that Tolkien's prose "seems sometimes to be protracted for its own sake". The author Anthony Price, reviewing the novel for The Oxford Mail, called it "more than immense; it is complete", praising Tolkien's Middle-earth as "an absolutely real and unendingly exciting world". He admired the characterization of Tom Bombadil, the Ents, and Gollum. In his view, the One Ring was destroyed "with terrifying logic", though he did not demand that the text end there, noting that the hobbits' return to the Shire put the larger events in perspective.

The novelist and publisher Michael Straight, reviewing the whole of The Lord of the Rings in The New Republic, wrote that the devastated landscapes in the work recalled Tolkien's First World War experiences, just as the snowstorm in the Misty Mountains recalled his climbing trip in Switzerland, and the Shire reflected England. He concluded by calling the novel a work of genius.

The Scottish poet and critic Edwin Muir, who had praised The Fellowship of the Ring in 1954, attacked the completed book in 1955 in The Sunday Observer as "a boy's adventure story". He compared it to the works of Rider Haggard, and stated that "except for a few old wizards", all the characters "are boys masquerading as adult[s]".

=== Of "The Scouring of the Shire" ===
Formal structure of The Lord of the Rings: narrative arcs balancing the main text on the quest to destroy the One Ring in Mordor with The Scouring of the Shire

Critics have considered the volume's penultimate chapter, "The Scouring of the Shire", the most important chapter in the whole of The Lord of the Rings. Although Tolkien denied that the chapter was an allegory for Britain in the aftermath of World War II, commentators have argued that it can be applied to that period, with clear contemporary political references that include a satire of socialism, echoes of Nazism, allusions to the shortages in postwar Britain, and a strand of environmentalism. According to Tolkien, the idea of such a chapter was planned from the outset as part of the overall formal structure of The Lord of the Rings, though its details were not worked out until much later. The chapter was intended to counterbalance the larger plot, concerning the physical journey to destroy the One Ring, with a moral quest upon the return home, to purify the Shire and to take personal responsibility. Tolkien considered other identities for the wicked Sharkey before settling on Saruman late in his composition process. The chapter has been called one of the most famous anticlimaxes in literature.

=== Of "The Tale of Aragorn and Arwen" ===
Tolkien called "The Tale of Aragorn and Arwen", in the appendices at the end of the volume, "really essential to the story". In contrast to the non-narrative appendices it extends the main story of the book to cover events both before and after it, one reason it would not fit in the main text. Tolkien gave another reason for its exclusion, namely that the main text is told from the hobbits' point of view. The tale to some extent mirrors the "Tale of Beren and Lúthien", also a story of the love between a Man and an Elf, set in an earlier age of Middle-earth. This creates a feeling of historical depth, in what scholars note is an approach similar to that of Dante in his Inferno. Aspects of the tale discussed by scholars include the nature of love and death; the balance Tolkien strikes between open Christianity and his treatment of his characters as pagan; and the resulting paradox that although Tolkien was a Roman Catholic and considered the book fundamentally Catholic, Middle-earth societies lack religions of their own. It has been noted also that the tale's relegation to an appendix deprives the main story of much of its love-interest, shifting the book's emphasis towards action.

== See also ==
- The History of The Lord of the Rings

== Sources ==
- Birns, Nicholas (2012). "'You Have Grown Very Much': The Scouring of the Shire and the Novelistic Aspects of The Lord of the Rings". Journal of the Fantastic in the Arts. 23 (1): 82–101. JSTOR 24353144.
- Carpenter, Humphrey, ed. (2023) [1981]. The Letters of J. R. R. Tolkien: Revised and Expanded Edition. New York: HarperCollins. ISBN 978-0-35-865298-4.
- Colebatch, Hal G. P. (October 1989). "Tolkien and his critics". Quadrant. 33 (10): 62–67. ISSN 0033-5002.
- Colebatch, Hal G. P. (2007). "Communism". In Drout, Michael (ed.). The J. R. R. Tolkien Encyclopedia: Scholarship and Critical Assessment. CRC Press/Taylor & Francis. pp. 108–109.
- Dickerson, Matthew; Evans, Jonathan (2006). Ents, Elves, and Eriador: The Environmental Vision of J.R.R. Tolkien. University Press of Kentucky. pp. 215–234. ISBN 0-8131-7159-8.
- Donnelly, Jerome (2018). "Nazis in the Shire: Tolkien and Satire". Mythlore. 37 (1). Article 6.
- Hirsch, Bernhard (27 November 2014). "After the "end of all things": The Long Return Home to the Shire". Tolkien Studies. 11 (11): 77–107. doi:10.1353/tks.2014.0015. ISSN 1547-3163. S2CID 170501504.
- Kocher, Paul H. (1974) [1972]. Master of Middle-earth: The Achievement of J.R.R. Tolkien. Penguin Books. ISBN 978-0-14-003877-4.
- Richards, Jay; Witt, Jonathan (2014). "The Scouring of the Shire". The Hobbit Party: The Vision of Freedom That Tolkien Got, and the West Forgot. Ignatius Press. ISBN 978-1-58617-823-9.
- Shippey, Tom (2001). J. R. R. Tolkien: Author of the Century. HarperCollins. pp. 219–220. ISBN 978-0261-10401-3.
- Shippey, Tom (2005) [1982]. The Road to Middle-Earth: How J. R. R. Tolkien Created a New Mythology (Third ed.). HarperCollins. ISBN 978-0-261-10275-0.
- Waito, David M. (2010). "The Shire Quest: The 'Scouring of the Shire' as the Narrative and Thematic Focus of The Lord of the Rings". Mythlore. 28 (3–4): 155–177.
