= Battle of the Pelennor Fields =

Fictional battle in The Lord of the Rings by J. R. R. Tolkien

- Part of War of the Ring
Date	14–15 March 3019
Location	Minas Tirith and the surrounding Pelennor Fields
Result	Gondor-Rohan victory

Belligerents
Gondor; Rohan; The Grey Company	Mordor; Khand; Harad; Rhûn

Commanders and leaders
Aragorn; King Théoden †; 3rd Marshal Éomer; Prince Imrahil; Gandalf; Halbarad †	Witch-king of Angmar †; Gothmog †

Strength
~3,000 Gondorians from Minas Tirith; ~500 Guards of the Citadel; Less than 3,000 South Gondorians and men from outlying provinces; ~6,000 Rohirrim cavalry soldiers; 30 Northern Dunedain; Total ~12,500	Tens of thousands of Orcs, Easterlings, Haradrim and Variags (Note: Tolkien does not state how many Orcs and Men fought on the Mordor side, and the clues available are vague. Estimates of the number of Orcs range from 30,000 upwards; Karen Wynn Fonstad states that Mordor outnumbered Gondor by "at least four to one", giving a "minimum 45,000", made up of ~20,000 Angmar, ~18,000 Haradrim, and ~7000 others from Rhun and Khand. Higher figures have been given for enemy forces including Men as well as Orcs. Woosnam-Savage records that "over 200,000" Orcs were portrayed in Peter Jackson's film version of the battle.) Several hundred oliphaunts and trolls

Casualties and losses
~3,000 killed	Entire force destroyed

The Battle of the Pelennor Fields ([pɛˈlɛnnɔr]), in J. R. R. Tolkien's novel The Lord of the Rings, was the defence of the city of Minas Tirith by the forces of Gondor and the cavalry of its ally Rohan, against the forces of the Dark Lord Sauron from Mordor and its allies the Haradrim and the Easterlings. It was the largest battle in the War of the Ring. It took place at the end of the Third Age in the Pelennor Fields, the townlands and fields between Minas Tirith and the River Anduin.

In search of Tolkien's sources, scholars have compared the battle with the historic account of the Battle of the Catalaunian Fields where King Theodoric I was trampled to death by his own men after he fell from his horse. Others have likened the death of the Witch-king of Angmar to the death of Macbeth, who was similarly prophesied not to die by the hand of man "of woman born"; and the crowing of a cockerel at the moment the Witch-king was about to enter the city has been said to recall the cock-crow heralding the resurrection of Jesus at the moment that Simon Peter denied knowing him.

Scholars analysing the story have commented on Tolkien's theory of Northern courage, which carries on even in the face of certain death. They have noted, too, the elegiac tone, echoing that of the Old English poem Beowulf, the use of alliterative verse, and the nature of the armour, which is mostly early medieval-style mail shirts with additions of plate armour. Others have commented on Tolkien's vivid descriptions of battle, noting that he served in the Battle of the Somme.

The battle formed a "spectacular" centrepiece in Peter Jackson's film The Lord of the Rings: The Return of the King.

== Fiction ==
=== Background ===
The city of Minas Tirith was besieged following the fall of Osgiliath and the Rammas Echor, Gondor's final barriers against the forces of Mordor. In the retreat to the city, Faramir, son of Denethor, Steward of Gondor, was severely wounded. Since the despairing Steward refused to leave his son's side, the Wizard Gandalf took command of the city's defences. (Note: Tolkien 1955, book 5, ch. 4 "The Siege of Gondor") Meanwhile, the enemy forces assembled before the city on the Pelennor Fields. A Great Darkness of smoke and cloud from Mordor blotted out the sun on the Dawnless Day. The Nazgûl or Ringwraiths, Sauron's most feared servants, flew over the battlefield on fell beasts, causing the defenders' morale to waver. (Note: Tolkien 1955, Appendix B, "The Great Years")

=== Participants ===
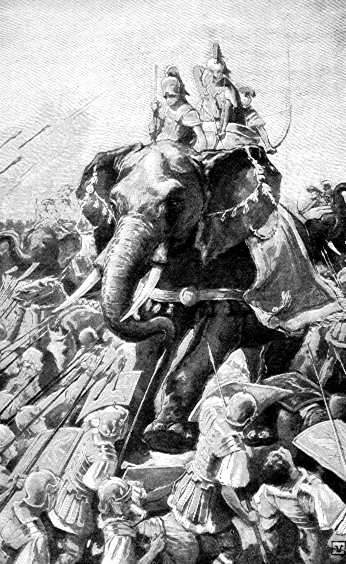
The Haradrim's use of elephant-like Oliphaunts echoes Pyrrhus of Epirus's elephants in his invasion of Ancient Rome.

Sauron's army from Minas Morgul, led by the Witch-king of Angmar (chief of the Nazgûl) greatly outnumbered the combined armies of Gondor and its allies. This army consisted of tens of thousands of orcs, trolls, and Men who had allied with Sauron. Sauron's forces included Haradrim Southrons who brought Oliphaunts, Easterlings from Rhûn and Variags from Khand, and many Orcs and Trolls. Tolkien describes the army as the greatest to "issue from that vale since the days of Isildur's might, no host so fell and strong in arms had yet assailed the fords of Anduin; and yet it was but one and not the greatest of the hosts that Mordor now sent forth." (Note: Tolkien 1954, book 4, ch. 8 "The Stairs of Cirith Ungol")

The defenders' numbers were considerably less. Faramir was outnumbered by ten times at Osgiliath. The companies from outlying provinces of Gondor that came to the aid of Minas Tirith amounted to nearly 3,000 defenders. Prominent among these was a 700-strong contingent led by Prince Imrahil of Dol Amroth, Denethor's brother-in-law. Their number was smaller than expected since Gondor's coastal towns were being attacked by the Corsairs of Umbar. (Note: Tolkien 1955, book 5, ch. 1 "Minas Tirith") (Note: Tolkien 1955, book 5, ch. 9 "The Last Debate")

Rohan, Gondor's northern ally, (Note: Tolkien 1955, book 5, ch. 3 "The Muster of Rohan") contributed a 6,000-strong cavalry army. The Men of Rohan (the Rohirrim) were "thrice outnumbered by the Haradrim alone". (Note: The Return of the King, book 5, ch. 6 "The Battle of the Pelennor Fields")

Further reinforcements from the coastal towns of Gondor sailed on Corsair ships to the city, led by Aragorn, who had a claim to the throne of Gondor, as he was descended from Isildur, the last High King of Gondor and Arnor. He led a small force (Note: Tolkien 1955, book 5, ch. 2 "The Passing of the Grey Company") of Rangers of the North, representing Arnor.

=== The battle ===
Main actions in the battle, with the forces of Mordor, Rohan, the city of Minas Tirith, and Aragorn's army from the south of Gondor. The actions take place over several days. All locations are diagrammatic.

After breaking the city gate with Grond, the Witch-king of Angmar rode under "the archway that no enemy ever yet had passed". Gandalf, on his horse Shadowfax, alone stood in his way. But before the two could fight, they heard the horns of the Rohirrim, who had arrived at the Rammas Echor, the wall around the Pelennor Fields, newly broken by the invading orcs. Dawn broke, and the main battle began. The Rohirrim had bypassed Sauron's lookouts thanks to the Wild Men (the Drúedain), who led them through the hidden Stonewain Valley of their Drúadan Forest. (Note: Tolkien 1955, book 5, ch. 5 "The Ride of the Rohirrim")

Charging the ranks of Mordor, the Rohirrim split into two groups. The left group, including the van, broke the Witch-king's right wing. The right group secured the walls of Minas Tirith. They destroyed siege engines and camps, and drove off the Haradrim cavalry. Théoden killed the chieftain of the Haradrim and threw down their standard. The Witch-king exchanged his horse for his winged steed and attacked Théoden. With a dart, he killed the king's horse, Snowmane; it fell and crushed the king.

The Black Breath, the terror spread by the Witch-king, drove off Théoden's guards, but his niece Éowyn (disguised as a man and calling herself "Dernhelm" (Note: The pseudonym means "secret helmet" in Old English.)) stood firm, challenging the Witch-king. She cut off the head of the Witch-king's mount; he broke her shield and shield arm with his mace. The hobbit Meriadoc Brandybuck, who had accompanied "Dernhelm", stabbed the Witch-king behind the knee with his Barrow-blade, a dagger from the ancient kingdom of Arnor enchanted against the forces of Angmar. The Witch-king staggered forwards, and Éowyn "drove her sword between crown and mantle", killing him. This fulfilled Glorfindel's Macbeth-style prophecy following the fall of Arnor that the Witch-king would not die "by the hand of man". (Note: Tolkien 1955, Appendix A, "Gondor and the Heirs of Anárion") Both the weapons that struck his undead flesh were destroyed.

Éowyn's brother Éomer arrived to find Théoden mortally wounded; he named Éomer king before dying. Éomer then saw his sister unconscious. Mistaking her for dead, he became enraged and led his entire army in a near-suicidal charge. His vanguard broke out far beyond the rest of the Rohirrim, risking becoming encircled. Meanwhile, Imrahil led Gondor's men in a sortie from Minas Tirith. Imrahil rode up to Éowyn and found she was still alive, though gravely ill from the Black Breath. She and Merry were sent to the Houses of Healing in the city.

Timeline (Note: Tolkien 1955, Appendix B, "The Tale of Years", "The Great Years", "3019: March")
Date	Events
10 March	The Dawnless Day: Gondor in darkness from Mordor. Rohan army sets out from Harrowdale. Gandalf rescues Faramir outside Minas Tirith's gates. Morannon army moves into Anorien. Minas Morgul army sets out.
11 March	Denethor sends Faramir to fight at Osgiliath. Morannon army invades Eastern Rohan from north. (Note: Shown as 1 on diagram.)
12 March	Faramir retreats to causeway forts. Aragorn forces Corsairs back to Pelargir. Rohan army reaches Minrimmon.
13 March	Minas Morgul army overruns Pelennor Fields. (Note: Shown as 2 on diagram.); Aragorn captures Corsair fleet at Pelargir. Rohan army reaches Druadan Forest.
14 March	Minas Tirith is besieged. Rohan army reaches Grey Wood.
15 March	(pre-dawn) The Witch-king breaks Minas Tirith gates. (dawn) Rohan's horns heard in Minas Tirith. Battle of the Pelennor Fields: Rohan cavalry charge. (Note: Shown as 3 on diagram.); Imrahil attacks from Minas Tirith. (Note: Shown as 4 on diagram.); Aragorn arrives in Corsair ships, joins attack. (Note: Shown as 5 on diagram.)

Denethor prepared to burn himself and his son upon a funeral pyre, believing Faramir to be beyond cure. Only the intervention of the hobbit Peregrin Took, Beregond (a Guard of the Citadel) and Gandalf saved Faramir, but Denethor immolated himself before they could stop him. Tolkien indirectly states that Théoden's death could have been prevented if Gandalf had helped the Rohirrim instead, as he had intended. (Note: Tolkien 1955, book 5, ch. 7 "The Pyre of Denethor")

Out on the Pelennor Fields, the battle was turning against Gondor and its allies. Though the Rohirrim had inflicted enormous damage on their enemies, Sauron's forces were still numerically superior, and Gothmog, the lieutenant of Minas Morgul, in command after the death of the Witch-king, summoned reserves from nearby Osgiliath. The Rohirrim were now on the southern half of the Pelennor, with enemies between them and the Anduin, and Gothmog's reinforcements threatened to occupy the centre of the Pelennor, thus surrounding the Rohirrim and preventing the Gondorian troops from joining with them. Éomer was by this time only about a mile from the Harlond, so rather than cut his way through to the river, he prepared to make a last stand on a hill.

Meanwhile, a fleet of black ships, apparently the navy of the Corsairs of Umbar, Sauron's allies, sailed up Anduin to the Harlond. Just before reaching the quays, the flagship unfurled the ancient banner of the Kings of Gondor. This sight alone put heart into the Rohirrim and Imrahil's forces and demoralised Sauron's armies. The ships indeed were manned by Aragorn and his Rangers, Gimli the Dwarf, Legolas the Elf, the Half-elven brothers Elladan and Elrohir, and fresh troops from southern Gondor. Legolas and Gimli later relate how a ghostly host commanded by Aragorn, the Dead Men of Dunharrow, captured the ships from the Corsairs chiefly through fear.

This proved the turning point of the battle. A large portion of Sauron's forces were now pinned between Aragorn's and Éomer's forces, while Imrahil's troops advanced from the direction of the city. Another prophecy is fulfilled when Aragorn and Éomer meet again "in the midst of the battle", as Aragorn had said in the Hornburg. Though the advantage now rested with Gondor, fighting continued throughout the day, until at sunset no living enemy remained on the Pelennor Fields.

=== Outcome ===
The battle was only a tactical defeat for Sauron, as he had committed only a small portion of his forces to the assault, but he had lost the Witch-king, his chief lieutenant. The Captains of the West understood that their victory too would be only momentary, unless the Ring-bearer completed his task. Therefore, it was decided that the Host of the West should march to the Morannon without delay, to draw Sauron's attention away from Mordor. The victory allowed them to send a force to challenge Sauron, and still leave Minas Tirith better defended than it had been during the siege. However, Denethor was dead, as were Halbarad, Théoden, and many officers and men of Gondor and Rohan, and some would have to be kept in Gondor in case of attack, so only a small force could be sent. The climactic Battle of the Morannon soon followed. (Note: The Return of the King, book 5, ch. 10 "The Black Gate Opens")

== Concept and creation ==
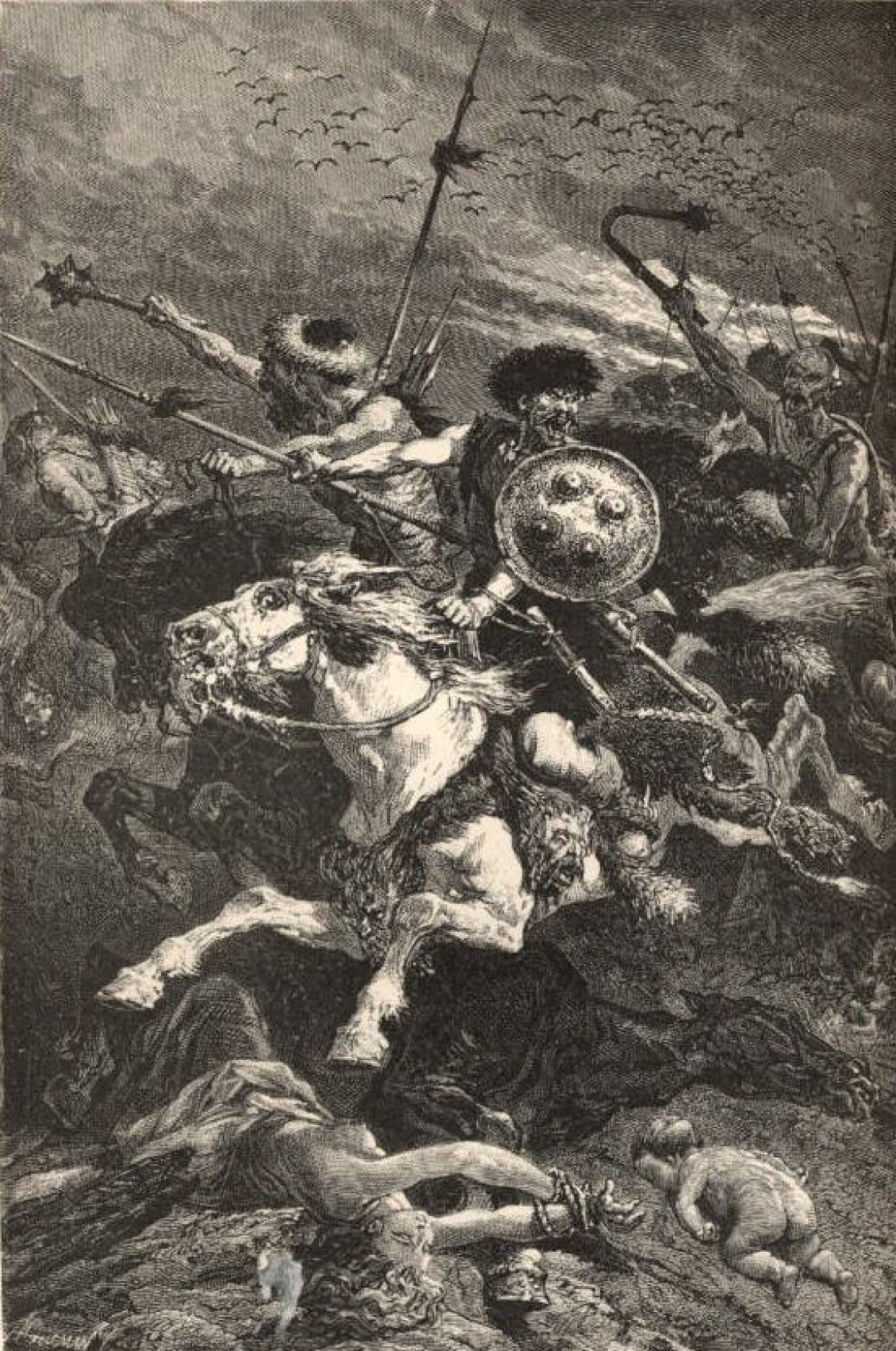
The battle, and in particular the death of Théoden, has been compared to the historic Battle of the Catalaunian Fields. Painting by Alphonse de Neuville.

The War of the Ring, the third volume of The History of the Lord of the Rings, contains superseded versions of the battle. Some changes of detail are apparent. For example, Théoden dies by a projectile to the heart instead of being crushed by his horse; when Éowyn reveals her sex she has cut her hair short, a detail absent from the final version. Tolkien also considered killing off both Théoden and Éowyn. (Note: Tolkien 1990, Part Three: Minas Tirith, ch. 9 "The Battle of the Pelennor Fields")

The scholar Elizabeth Solopova notes that Tolkien repeatedly referred to a historic account of the Battle of the Catalaunian Fields by Jordanes, and analyses the two battles' similarities. Both battles take place between civilisations of the "East" and "West", and like Jordanes, Tolkien describes his battle as one of legendary fame that lasted for several generations. Another apparent similarity is the death of the Visigoth king Theodoric I on the Catalaunian Fields and that of Théoden on the Pelennor. Jordanes reports that Theodoric was thrown off by his horse and trampled to death by his own men who charged forward. Théoden similarly rallies his men shortly before he falls and is crushed by his horse. And like Theodoric, Théoden is carried from the battlefield with his knights weeping and singing for him while the battle still goes on.

== Analysis ==
=== Northern courage ===
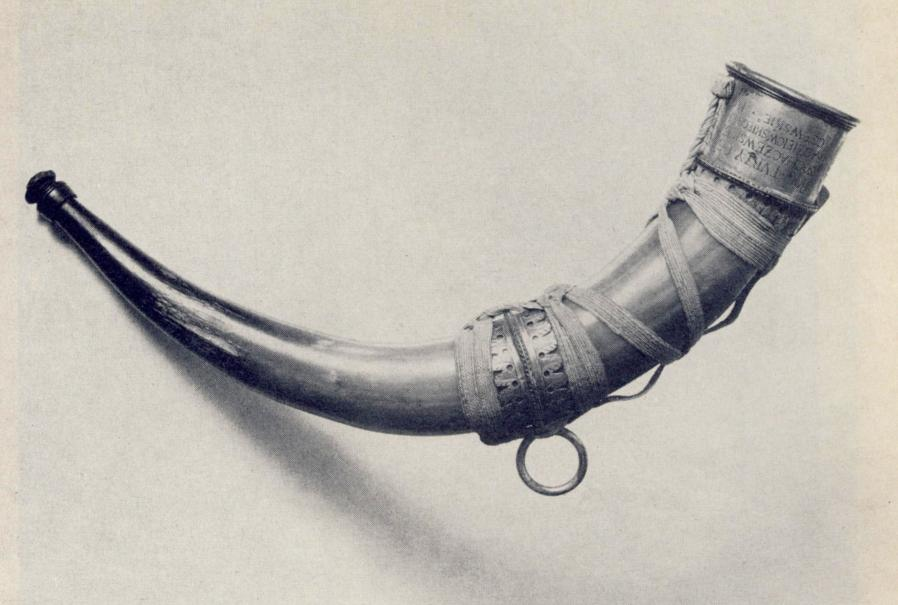
"Great horns of the North wildly blowing": here, one made from a horn of an aurochs

The arrival of Rohan is heralded, the Tolkien scholar Tom Shippey writes, by two calls: a cockerel crowing as the morning comes, and "as if in answer ... great horns of the North wildly blowing". The cock-crow recalls multiple accounts in Western literature that speak, Shippey writes, of renewed hope and life after death; of the call which told Simon Peter that he had denied Christ three times, and that there would, despite him, be a resurrection; of the cock-crow in Milton's Comus that would "be some solace yet"; of the cockerel in the Norse Ódáinsakr, killed and thrown over a wall by the witch, but crowing to King Hadding a moment later. As for the horns of Rohan, in Shippey's view "their meaning is bravado and recklessness", and in combination with the cock-crow, the message is that "he who fears for his life shall lose it, but that dying undaunted is no defeat; furthermore that this was true before the Christian myth that came to explain why". Shippey writes that warhorns exemplify the "heroic Northern world", as in what he calls the nearest Beowulf has to a moment of eucatastrophe, when Ongentheow's Geats, trapped all night, hear the horns of Hygelac's men coming to rescue them. The style of chivalry, too, the Tolkien scholar Thomas Honegger notes, is consciously of Anglo-Saxon knights (Old English: cniht), not a French-style chevalier. Shippey writes that prominent at the critical moment of the battle, the decisive charge of the Riders of Rohan, is panache, which he explains means both "the white horsetail on [Eomer's] helm floating in his speed" and "the virtue of sudden onset, the dash that sweeps away resistance". Shippey notes that this allows Tolkien to display Rohan both as English, based on their Old English names and words like "eored" (troop of cavalry), and as "alien, to offer a glimpse of the way land shapes people".

The Tolkien scholar Janet Brennan Croft notes that the battle is seen some of the time through the eyes of the Hobbit, Pippin, who like "the common soldier in the trenches of World War I" feels his part to be "far from glorious; there is tedious waiting, a sense of uselessness and futility, terror and pain and ugliness". Yet, Croft writes, Tolkien does not follow the Modernists and adopt irony as his tone; the Hobbits too are courageous, carrying on without hope. She cites Hugh Brogan's remark that their determination "master[s] all the grief and horror ... giving it dignity and significance", a therapeutic thought for a man whose mind had been darkened by war.

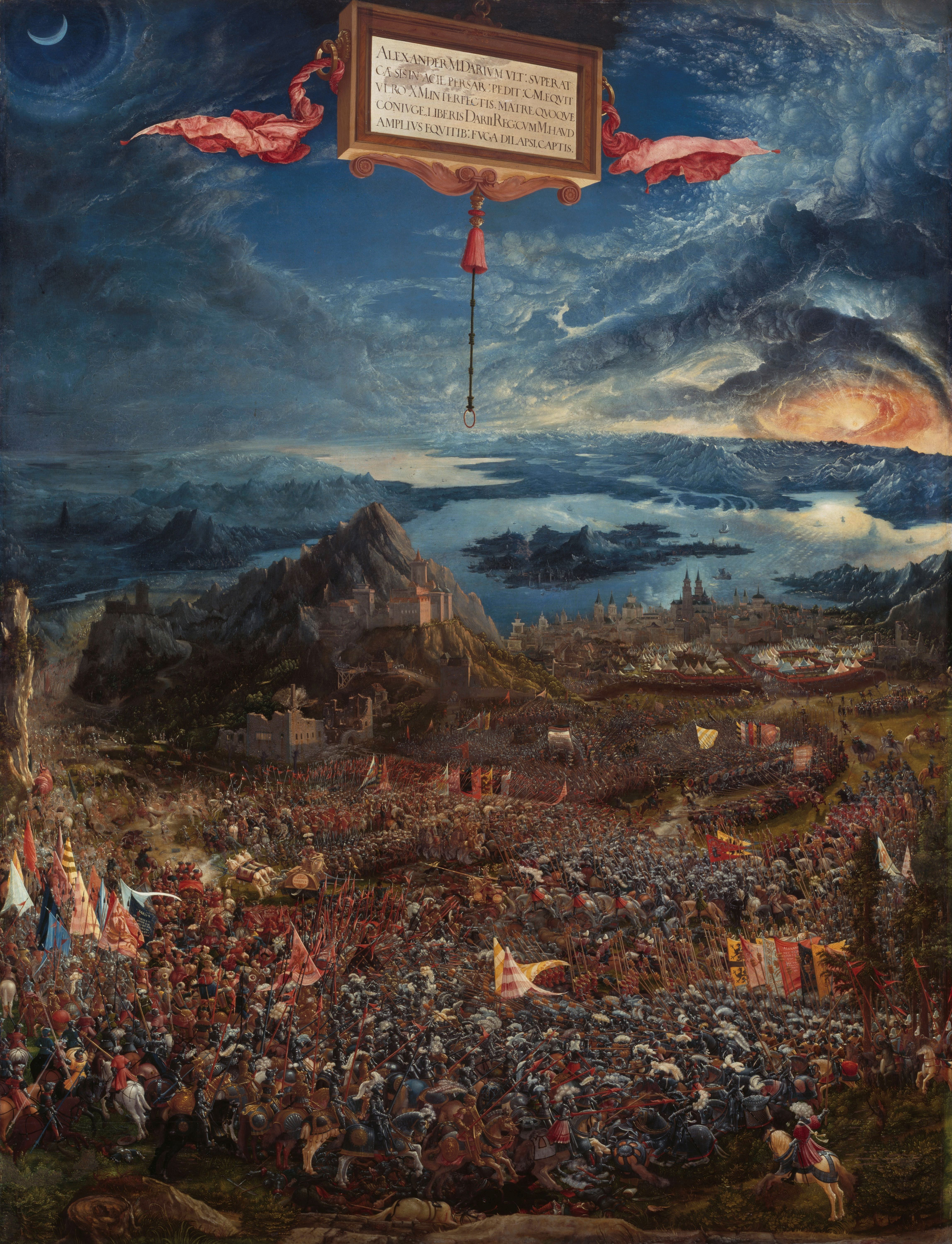
Albrecht Altdorfer's 1529 oil painting The Battle of Alexander at Issus inspired Peter Jackson's film depiction.

Julaire Andelin, in the J.R.R. Tolkien Encyclopedia, writes that prophecy in Middle-earth depended on characters' understanding of the Music of the Ainur, the divine plan for Arda, and was often ambiguous. Thus, Glorfindel's prophecy "not by the hand of man will [the Lord of the Nazgûl] fall" did not lead the Lord of the Nazgûl to suppose that he would die at the hands of a woman and a hobbit (Éowyn and Meriadoc). (Note: Tolkien 1955, Appendix A, I, iv "Gondor and the heirs of Anarion")

=== Elegiac tone ===
Robert Lee Mahon states in CEA Critic that Tolkien's account of the battle is tinged with the elegiac, so that whatever the outcome, much will be lost. Men have the gift of Iluvatar, death. In the battle, Aragorn and Éomer "were unscathed, for such was their fortune and the skill and might of their arms, and few indeed had dared to abide them ... in the hour of their wrath". So far so heroic, Mahon notes; "But many others were hurt or maimed or dead upon the field." The battle chapter ends with "an elegiac lay", in which Tolkien has a scop of Rohan imitate his beloved Beowulf: "We heard of the horns in the hills ringing, the swords shining in the South-kingdom... There Théoden fell, Thengling mighty ... high lord of the host. ... Death in the morning and at day's ending lords took and lowly. Long now they sleep under grass in Gondor." Mahon comments that the reader mourns even while rejoicing, in his view "the essence of great fantasy".

James Shelton, in Journal of Tolkien Research, writes that Éomer's (and Tolkien's) use of alliterative verse during the battle functions on different levels. After Théoden's death, Éomer declaims "Mourn not overmuch! Mighty was the fallen, meet was his ending. When his mound is raised, women then shall weep. War now calls us!" Shelton notes that Shippey rightly called this "'midway between' a lament and a battle-cry". This both honours the fallen king, and calls for Théoden's last fight to be continued with valour; yet, he writes, in a modern novel, the possibility is opened that Éomer will not live up to that ancient ideal: Éomer "wept as he spoke". This "northern courage" is to go on fighting, even if one knows one will die. Tolkien has thus, in Shelton's view, both portrayed Anglo-Saxon attitudes and humanized Éomer as a man with emotions behind the armour and the tradition.

=== Military realism ===
Nancy Martsch, in Mythlore, writes that Tolkien's descriptions of battle are vivid, noting that he served in the Battle of the Somme in 1916. She quotes another war veteran, C. S. Lewis's comment: "[Tolkien's] war has the very quality of the war my generation knew. It is all here: the endless, unintelligible movement, the sinister quiet of the front when 'everything is now ready', the flying civilians, the lively, vivid friendships, the background of something like despair and the merry foreground, and such heaven-sent windfalls as a cache of choice tobacco 'salvaged' from a ruin". She adds to this Tolkien's account of recovery in the Houses of Healing, "a subject usually passed over in fantasy literature". As for the siege of Minas Tirith, she writes that Tolkien could have been influenced by what he had seen of the British attack on Thiepval Ridge, with its fiery night-time bombardment, the fortifications across a river, allied aircraft "scouting and strafing" Nazgul-like over the German lines.

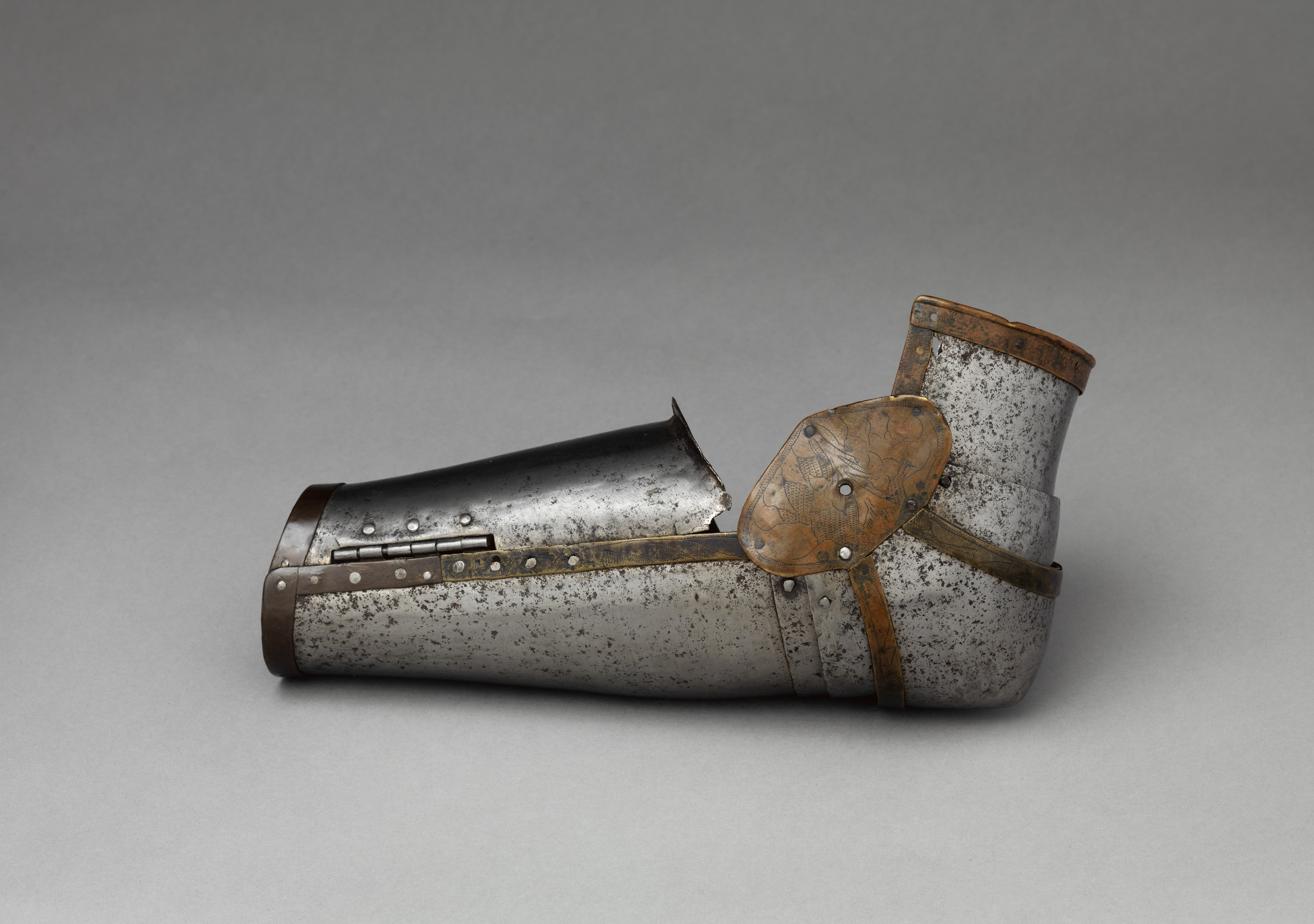
A left-arm vambrace; the bend is for the knight's elbow.

David Bell, writing in Mallorn, analyses the battle, concluding that "the Captains of the West were lucky", as Napoleon had reportedly asked that his generals should be. He notes that if Aragorn had been late, the battle would have been lost. All the same, Men were, he writes, usually bigger and stronger than Orcs; they were arguably better armed and armoured; and they were motivated by leadership, where the Orcs were "driven to battle"; with the loss of the Witch-king of Angmar, the Orcs were leaderless and demoralised. On the matter of armour, Honegger considers Tolkien's mention of prince Imrahil's shining vambrace. He writes that it was a piece of plate armour, hinting at a late medieval pattern; but given Tolkien's likening of Rohan's army to those of the Bayeux Tapestry, and his explicit mentions of mail shirts, the armour in the battle must mainly have been the earlier Beowulf-style mail, with additional plate.

== Adaptations ==
=== Radio ===
In the 1981 BBC radio series The Lord of the Rings, the Battle of the Pelennor Fields is heard from two sides, the first being mainly Pippin's. One hears him discussing with Denethor, and as in the book, he has to find Gandalf to prevent Denethor from burning Faramir. The second side is the battle itself. Théoden's speech is declaimed, followed by music. A vocalist sings how the Rohirrim host rides forth and attacks the forces of darkness. Then the vocalism changes again and one hears Jack May and Anthony Hyde, voicing respectively Théoden and Éomer, saying a Nazgûl is coming. The 'opera' begins again, stating the Witch-king attacks Théoden, strikes him down and prepares to kill him. The vocalism ends here, then one hears Éowyn facing the Witch-king and slaying him.

=== Film ===
The forces of Mordor assaulting Minas Tirith, in Peter Jackson's 2003 film The Lord of the Rings: The Return of the King

The battle is the centrepiece of Peter Jackson's film The Lord of the Rings: The Return of the King; The Telegraph wrote that "the battle scenes involving the storming of Minas Tirith and the climactic battle of Pelennor Fields are quite simply the most spectacular and breathtaking ever filmed". Jackson stated that he had taken inspiration from Albrecht Altdorfer's 1529 oil painting, The Battle of Alexander at Issus, depicting the events of 333 BC, with "people holding all of these pikes and spears [against an] incredibly stormy landscape".

CNN.com put the battle on a list of best and worst battle scenes in film, where it appeared twice: one of the best before the Army of the Dead arrives, and one of the worst after that, dubbing the battle's climax an "oversimplified cop out" as a result of their involvement.

== See also ==
- Battle of Helm's Deep – the previous battle, in which the Rohirrim defeat Saruman's army
- Battle of the Morannon – the last battle of the War of the Ring
