= Harad =

Fictional land in Tolkien's Middle-earth, south of Gondor and Mordor

- J. R. R. Tolkien's legendarium location
- Haradrim chieftain's standard
- First appearance: The Fellowship of the Ring

In-universe information
- Other names: Haradwaith, Hyarmen, the Sunlands
- Type: Vast hot southern region
- Locations: Umbar, Near Harad, Far Harad

In J. R. R. Tolkien's high fantasy The Lord of the Rings, Harad is the immense land south of Gondor and Mordor. Its main port is Umbar, the base of the Corsairs of Umbar whose ships serve as the Dark Lord Sauron's fleet. Its people are the dark-skinned Haradrim or Southrons; their warriors wear scarlet and gold, and are armed with swords and round shields; some ride gigantic elephants called mûmakil.

Tolkien based the Haradrim on ancient Aethiopians, people of Sub-Saharan Africa, following his philological research on the Old English word Sigelwara. He decided that this word referred to some kind of soot-black fire demon before it was applied to the Aethiopians. He based the Haradrim's use of war elephants, meanwhile, on that of Pyrrhus of Epirus in his war against Ancient Rome. Critics have debated whether Tolkien was racist in making the protagonists white and the antagonists black, but others have noted that Tolkien showed anti-xenophobic sentiments in real life, opposing any attempt to demonise the enemy in both World Wars.

In Peter Jackson's 2002 film The Two Towers, the Haradrim were based on 12th century Saracens: they have turbans and flowing robes, and they ride mûmakil. The Haradrim appear in a variety of games and merchandise inspired by The Lord of the Rings.

== Middle-earth narrative ==
=== Geography ===
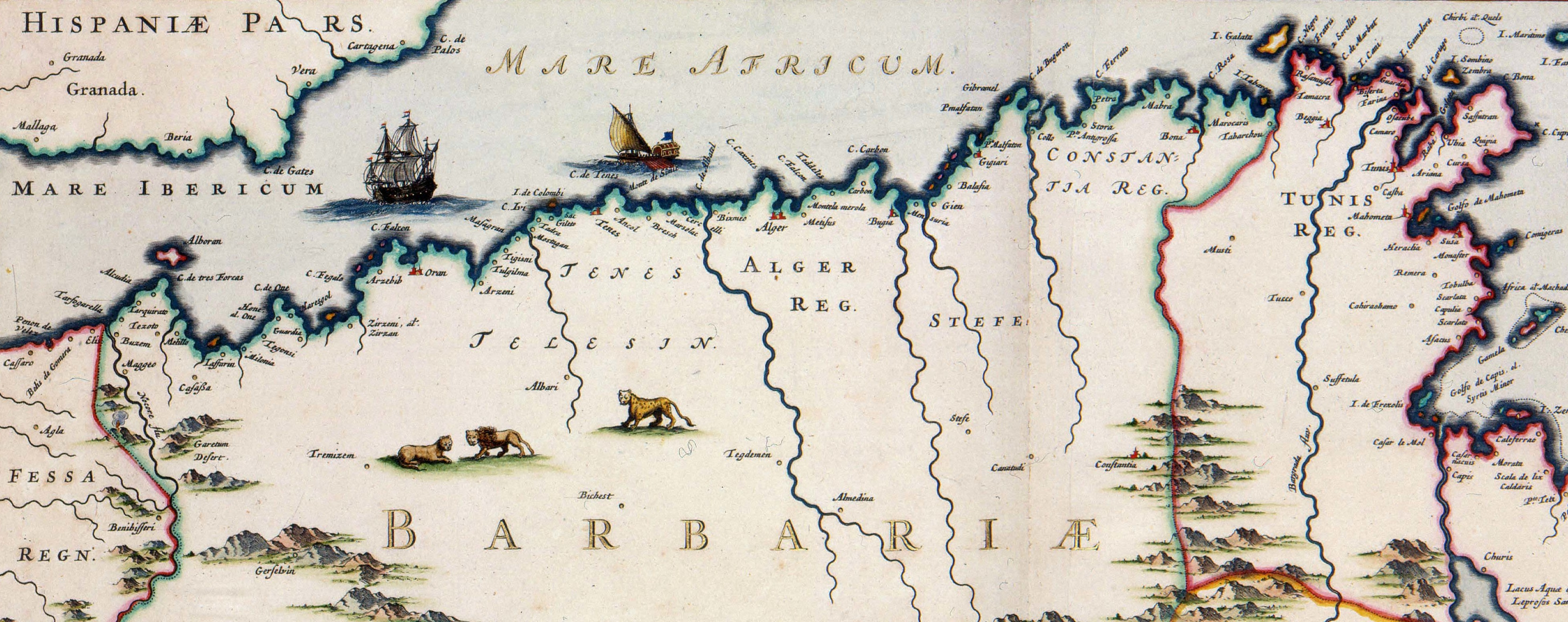
Tolkien's Corsairs were inspired by the Barbary Pirates or Corsairs of the North African coast. Map by Jan Janssonius, c. 1650

Harad is a large land in the south of Middle-earth, bordered to the north by (from west to east) the lands of Gondor, Mordor, Khand and Rhûn. Historically the border with Gondor was to be the river Harnen, but by the time of the War of the Ring all the land further north to the river Poros is under the influence of the Haradrim. The border with Mordor runs along the southern Mountains of Shadow. Harad's west coast (the nearest to Gondor) is washed by the Great Sea, the western ocean of Middle-earth. Harad's eastern shores look out on the Eastern Sea, Middle-earth's eastern ocean. (Note: Tolkien 1977 "Akallabêth")

The elves named the land and its people Haradwaith, "South-folk", from the Sindarin harad, meaning "south", and gwaith, meaning "people". The Quenya word Hyarmen similarly means "south" in addition to being the name of the country. The hobbits called the area the Sunlands, and the people Swertings. (Note: Tolkien 1954, book 4 ch 3, "The Black Gate is Closed", ISBN 0 04 823046 4 "I've heard tales of the big folk down away in the Sunlands. Swertings we call 'em in our tales; and they ride on oliphaunts, 'tis said, when they fight.") Aragorn briefly describes his journeys in the land as being in "Harad where the stars are strange". (Note: Tolkien 1954a "The Council of Elrond") Tolkien confirmed that this meant that Aragorn had travelled "some distance into the southern hemisphere" in Harad. (Note: Tolkien 1980 part 4 ch. III "The Istari" p. 402 note 10; ISBN 0-04-823179-7)

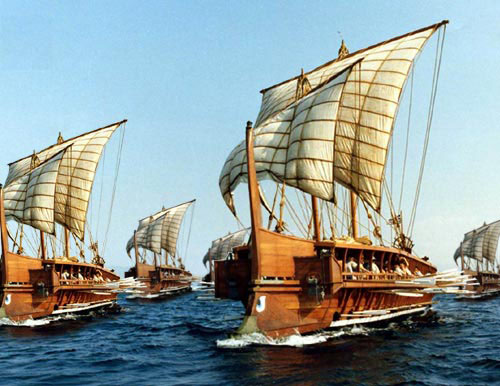
Tolkien called the Corsairs of Umbar's ships "dromunds" (galleys, as in this reconstruction) and deep ships with oars and sails. (Note: Tolkien 1955, "The Battle of the Pelennor Fields" "for black against the glittering stream they beheld a fleet borne up on the wind: dromunds, and ships of great draught [with deep hulls] with many oars, and with black sails bellying in the breeze.")

The great harbour city of Umbar lies on Harad's north-west coast; its natural harbour is the base of the Corsairs of Umbar, inspired by the Barbary pirates, who provide the Dark Lord Sauron with a sizeable fleet. The ships are different types of galleys, with both oars and sails; some are named as dromunds, others as having a deep draught (requiring a deep channel), many oars, and black sails.

Elsewhere in Harad there are "many towns"; (Note: Tolkien 1977 'Of the Rings of Power and the Third Age', p. 290; ISBN 0 04 823139 8) one of these is "the inland city", the home of Queen Berúthiel (mentioned by Tolkien in an interview). The Harad Road is the main overland route between Gondor and Harad. (Note: Tolkien 1955, book 6 ch. 2) Harad possesses jungles with apes, (Note: Tolkien 1954 book 3 ch. 7 "apes in the dark forests of the South") grasslands, (Note: Tolkien 1955, Appendix A:II "the far fields of the South") and deserts.

Gondor described Harad as consisting of Near Harad and Far Harad. Near Harad corresponds loosely with North Africa or the Maghreb, while Far Harad, the vastly larger of the two regions, corresponds loosely with sub-Saharan Africa. Tolkien's own annotated map of Middle-earth, used by the illustrator Pauline Baynes to construct her iconic map, suggests that "Elephants appear in the great battle outside Minas Tirith (as they did in Italy under Pyrrhus) but they would be in place in the blank squares of Harad – also camels."

=== People ===
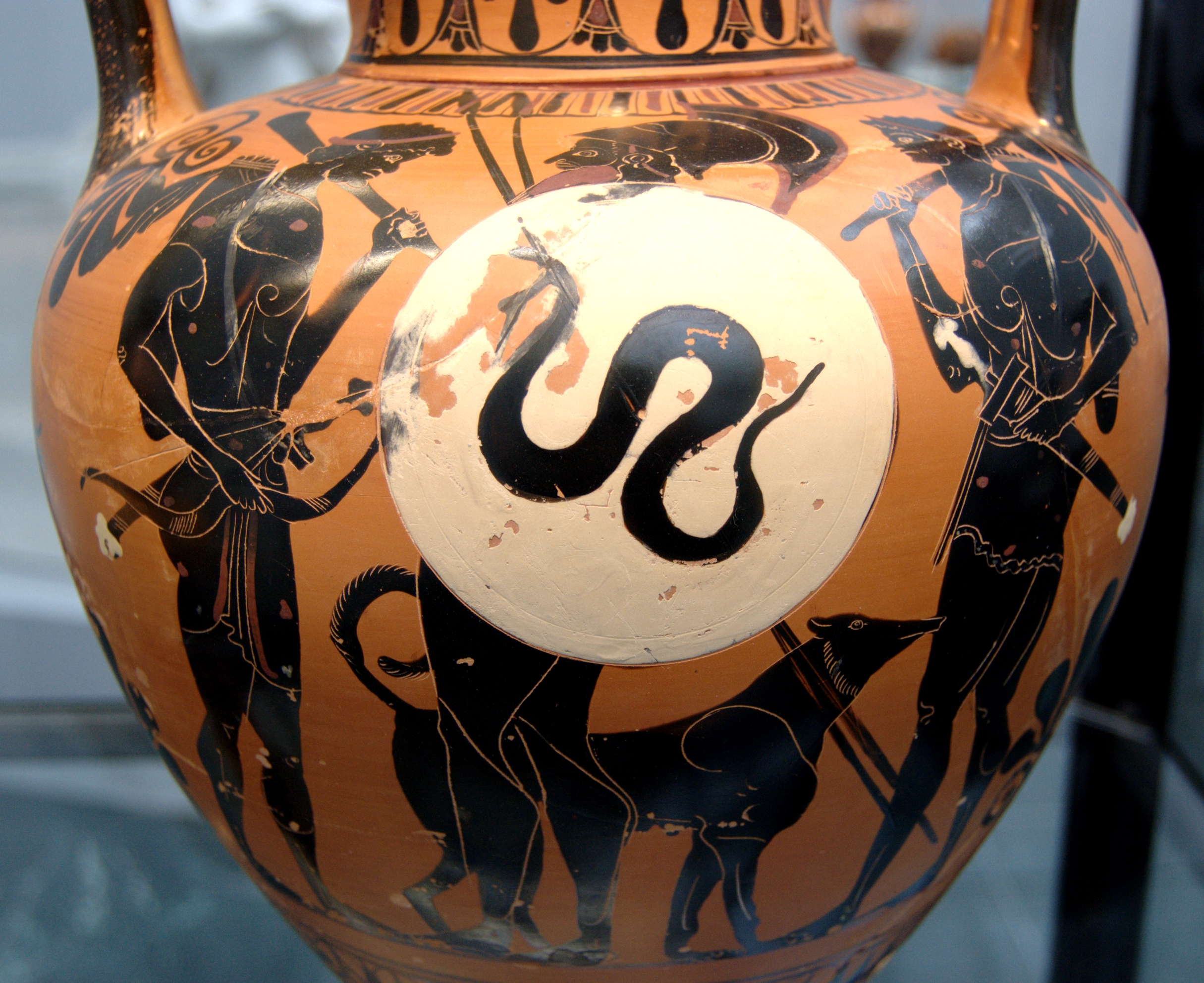
Christopher Tolkien linked the Haradrim with ancient Aethiopians. (Note: Tolkien 1989, ch. XXV p. 435 & p. 439 note 4) Black-figure Attic amphora with the Aethiopian king Memnon, a serpent emblem on his round shield, flanked by two of his warriors, c. 510 BC

The Men of Harad are called Haradrim ("South-multitude"), Haradwaith, or Southrons by the people of Gondor. The Haradrim are of various ethnicities and cultures; some are organized into kingdoms. (Note: Tolkien 1955, book 4 ch 4, "Of Herbs and Stewed Rabbit") (Note: Tolkien 1954, Appendix A §I(iv)) Frodo and Sam meet Faramir and his Rangers of Ithilien just before the latter ambush a company of Haradrim on the North Road. Frodo and Sam do not see much of the battle, since they are positioned elsewhere, but they hear the sounds of fighting, and a slain Haradrim warrior crashes at their feet. This warrior is described as having "brown" skin, with black plaits of hair braided with gold. He wears a scarlet tunic, as do the other Haradrim, and a gold collar. He is armed with a sword and has a corslet of brazen scales. Their standards are scarlet, and their great beasts, the mûmakil, have scarlet and gold trappings. They carry round spiked shields, painted yellow and black. Their leaders have a serpent emblem. The people of Far Harad were black-skinned; a group of them is described as "black men like half-trolls with white eyes and red tongues" and "troll-men". (Note: Tolkien 1955, book 5 ch 6, "Battle of the Pelennor Fields")

=== History ===
The Haradrim are independent peoples, but in the Second Age they are caught between the ambitions of Sauron (the Dark Lord) and the Númenóreans, who often kill Haradrim or sell them as slaves, and who become rulers of Harad. Over the centuries many Haradrim fall under Sauron's dominion, and to "them Sauron was both king and god, and they feared him exceedingly". (Note: Tolkien 1977, "Of the Rings of Power and the Third Age") They become mixed with Númenórean settlers, some of whom fall under the sway of Sauron as "Black Númenóreans". (Note: Tolkien 1955, Appendix A §I(iv) footnote) Under King Hyarmendacil I "South-victor" of Gondor, Harad becomes a vassal of Gondor. (Note: Tolkien 1955, Appendix A §I(iv)) By the time of the War of the Ring, the Haradrim are again under the dominion of Sauron, and the Haradrim Corsairs provide the whole of his Black Fleet; many other Haradrim join his armies, some riding mûmakil. In the Battle of the Pelennor Fields, the leader of the Haradrim army is killed by King Théoden of Rohan. (Note: Tolkien 1955, book 5 ch. 6 and book 6 ch. 4) (Note: Tolkien 1955, book 6 ch. 5)

Tolkien did not work out any particular languages for the Haradrim, though mûmak, "elephant", may be in the Harad language. Despite having a meaning in Quenya ("fate"), the name Umbar is adapted from the natives' language and not from Elvish or Adûnaic.

== Concept and creation ==
=== "Sigelwara Land" ===
Tolkien arrived at the idea of Harad, a hot Southern land, through his philological work. The Old English Biblical poem Exodus in the tenth-century Codex Junius 11 includes a passage that caught Tolkien's attention:

Codex Junius 11 (Old English)	Modern English
.. be suðan Sigelwara land, forbærned burhhleoðu, brune leode, hatum heofoncolum.	"... southward lay the Ethiop's land, parched hill-slopes and a race burned brown by the heat of the sun."

Imagemap with clickable links. Tolkien's Sigelwara etymologies, leading to major strands of his Legendarium including also the Silmarils and Balrogs. (Note: The essay was published in two parts, Tolkien 1932 and Tolkien 1934.)

Tolkien was interested in particular in the Old English word used for "Aethiopians": it was Sigelwara, or in Tolkien's emendation Sigelhearwan. The Tolkien scholar Tom Shippey writes that Tolkien's philological research, described in his essay "Sigelwara Land", began from the assumption that the word could not originally have meant Aethiopian, but must have been co-opted to that usage having once meant something comparable. Tolkien approached the question by analysing the two parts of the word. Sigel meant, according to Tolkien, "both sun and jewel", the former as it was the Old English name of the Sun rune, Proto-Germanic: *sowilō (ᛋ), the latter connotation from Latin sigillum, a seal.

Tolkien decided that Hearwa was related to the Old English heorð, meaning "hearth", and ultimately to the Latin carbo, meaning "soot". The resulting meaning for Sigelhearwan, Tolkien decided tentatively, was "rather the sons of Muspell than of Ham", an ancient class of demons in Northern mythology "with red-hot eyes that emitted sparks and faces black as soot". (Note: Shippey states that this analysis of Sigelhearwa both "helped to naturalise the Balrog" (a demon of fire) and contributed to the Silmarils, which combined the nature of the sun and jewels.) This was exactly the sort of "stray pagan concept" hinting at England's lost mythology that Tolkien wanted.

In drafts of The Lord of the Rings, Tolkien toyed with names such as Harwan and Sunharrowland for Harad, which were derived from Sigelwara; Christopher Tolkien notes that these are connected to his father's Sigelwara Land. The philologist Elizabeth Solopova similarly notes that the hobbits' name for Harad, Sunland, suggests a similar link.

== Analysis ==
=== Moral geography ===
Imagemap with clickable links of Tolkien's moral geography of Middle-earth, according to John Magoun

The Germanic studies scholar Sandra Ballif Straubhaar notes that it is not clear whether Tolkien meant the Haradrim to be grouped with his "Wild Men", though he named them as ancient enemies of Gondor. They are "ethnic others but not as ugly", they have a rich culture and well-trained elephants. The exception would be, she suggests, the men of Far [Southern] Harad whom the people of Gondor saw as "black men like half-trolls with white eyes and red tongues". With his "Southrons" from Harad, Tolkien had – in the view of John Magoun, writing in The J. R. R. Tolkien Encyclopedia – constructed a "fully expressed moral geography", from the hobbits' home in the Northwest, evil in the East, and "imperial sophistication and decadence" in the South. Magoun explains that Gondor is both virtuous, being West, and has problems, being South; Mordor in the Southeast is hellish, while Harad in the extreme South "regresses into hot savagery". (Note: Other scholars such as Walter Scheps and Isabel G. MacCaffrey have noted Middle-earth's "spatial cum moral dimensions".)

Solopova argues that the Haradrim's mûmakil war elephants put their country far to the East, since only India and lands to its east went on using war elephants after classical times. She and Stuart D. Lee mention that Tolkien could have used the Old English version by Ælfric of the Book of Maccabees, which carefully introduces elephants to its Anglo-Saxon audience, using much the same phrase as Sam Gamgee, "māre þonne sum hūs", "bigger than a house", before describing their use in battle; the hero stabs the elephant, which is carrying a "wīghūs", a "battle-house", from below. Tolkien however mentioned Pyrrhus of Epirus's use of war elephants against Ancient Rome in 280–275 BC in his notes for the illustrator Pauline Baynes.

=== The stereotypical "Other" ===
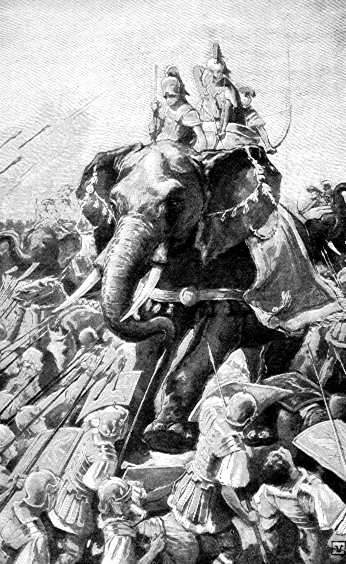
Tolkien related the Haradrim's mûmakil in the Battle of the Pelennor Fields to Pyrrhus of Epirus's war elephants in his invasion of Ancient Rome, as depicted here in an 1896 book by Helene Guerber.

Commentators such as Anderson Rearick and Stephen Shapiro have identified the Haradrim as a recognisably foreign race as well as the enemy, and have accused Tolkien of racism. Conversely, scholars such as Straubhaar have come to Tolkien's defence on the matter, noting that during the Second World War Tolkien expressed an anti-racist position. Straubhaar writes that "a polycultured, polylingual world is absolutely central" to Middle-earth, and that readers and filmgoers will easily see that. From there, she notes that the "recurring accusations in the popular media" of a racist view of the story are "interesting". She quotes the Swedish cultural studies scholar David Tjeder who described Gollum's account of the men of Harad ("Not nice; very cruel wicked Men they look. Almost as bad as Orcs, and much bigger." (Note: Tolkien 1954, book 4, ch. 3 "The Black Gate is Closed")) in Aftonbladet as "stereotypical and reflective of colonial attitudes". She argues instead that Gollum's view, with its "arbitrary and stereotypical assumptions about the 'Other'", is absurd, and that Gollum cannot be taken as an authority on Tolkien's opinion. Straubhaar contrasts this with Sam Gamgee's more humane response to the sight of a dead Harad warrior, which she finds "harder to find fault with": "He was glad that he could not see the dead face. He wondered what the man's name was and where he came from; and if he was really evil of heart, or what lies or threats had led him on the long march from his home." Straubhaar quotes Shapiro, who wrote in The Scotsman that "Put simply, Tolkien's good guys are white and the bad guys are black, slant-eyed, unattractive, inarticulate, and a psychologically undeveloped horde". Straubhaar concedes that Shapiro may have had a point with "slant-eyed", but comments that this was milder than that of many of his contemporary novelists such as John Buchan, and notes that Tolkien had in fact made "appalled objection" when people had misapplied his story to current events. She similarly observes that Tjeder had failed to notice Tolkien's "concerted effort" to change the Western European "paradigm" that speakers of supposedly superior languages were "ethnically superior".

== In other media ==
Haradrim in Peter Jackson's 2002 film The Two Towers were based on 12th century Saracens.

In Peter Jackson's 2002 film The Two Towers, the Haradrim appear Middle Eastern, with turbans, flowing robes, and riding mûmakil. A companion book on the film's "Creatures" states that the Haradrim were based on 12th century Saracens. The battle scene in Ithilien between the rangers of Gondor and the men of Harad was shot at the Twelve Mile Delta near Queenstown, New Zealand.

The Haradrim and the Corsairs of Umbar appear in merchandise for the film trilogy, such as toys, The Lord of the Rings Trading Card Game, and the computer game The Lord of the Rings: The Battle for Middle-earth II. "Haradrim Slayers" feature in the computer game The Lord of the Rings: War of the Ring, while in the video game Middle-earth: Shadow of War, Baranor, a playable character who is a captain in Gondor's guard, is originally from Harad.

Iron Crown Enterprises produced a series of books for their tabletop roleplaying game Middle-earth Role Playing containing information about Harad and content allowing games to be set there. Key publications included the setting books Umbar: Haven of the Corsairs (1982), Far Harad (1988), and Greater Harad (1990), as well as the adventure books Warlords of the Desert (1989), Forest of Tears (1989), and Hazards of the Harad Wood (1990). Games Workshop have produced miniatures and rules relating to Harad for use in the Middle Earth Strategy Battle Game, including for mumakil and Corsairs of Umbar.

== See also ==
- Calormenes, a race of men from a hot southern land from C. S. Lewis's Chronicles of Narnia
