= Beowulf and Middle-earth =

Literary analysis

J. R. R. Tolkien, a fantasy author and professional philologist, drew on the Old English poem Beowulf for multiple aspects of his Middle-earth legendarium, alongside other influences. He used elements such as names, monsters, and the structure of society in a heroic age. He emulated its style, creating an impression of depth and adopting an elegiac tone. Tolkien admired the way that Beowulf, written by a Christian looking back at a pagan past, just as he was, embodied a "large symbolism" without ever becoming allegorical. He worked to echo the symbolism of life's road and individual heroism in The Lord of the Rings.

The names of races, including ents, orcs, and elves, and place names such as Orthanc and Meduseld, derive from Beowulf. The werebear Beorn in The Hobbit has been likened to the hero Beowulf himself; both names mean "bear" and both characters have enormous strength. Scholars have compared some of Tolkien's monsters to those in Beowulf. Both his trolls and Gollum share attributes with Grendel, while Smaug's characteristics closely match those of the Beowulf dragon. Tolkien's Riders of Rohan are distinctively Old English, and he has made use of multiple elements of Beowulf in creating them, including their language, culture, and poetry. The godlike Valar, their earthly paradise of Valinor, and the Old Straight Road that allowed the elves to sail to it, may all derive from the Scyld Scefing passage at the start of the poem.

== Context ==
Beowulf is an epic poem in Old English, telling the story of its eponymous pagan hero. He becomes King of the Geats after ridding Heorot, the hall of the Danish king Hrothgar, of the monster Grendel, (Note: Beowulf also rid Heorot of Grendel's mother.) who was ravaging the land; he dies saving his people from a dragon. The tale is told in a roundabout way with many digressions into history and legend, and with a constant elegiac tone, ending in a dirge. It was written by a Christian poet, looking back reflectively on a time already in his people's distant past.

J. R. R. Tolkien was an English author and philologist of ancient Germanic languages, specialising in Old English; he spent much of his career as a professor at the University of Oxford. He is best known for his novels about his invented Middle-earth, The Hobbit and The Lord of the Rings. A devout Roman Catholic, he described The Lord of the Rings as "a fundamentally religious and Catholic work", rich in Christian symbolism.

The Tolkien scholar Tom Shippey, like Tolkien a philologist, called Beowulf the single work that most strongly influenced Tolkien, out of the many other sources that he used. He made use of it in his Middle-earth legendarium in multiple ways: in specific story-elements such as monsters; in Old English culture, as seen in the kingdom of Rohan; in the aesthetic style of The Lord of the Rings, with its impression of depth and its elegiac tone; and in its "large symbolism".

== People ==
=== A philologist's races ===
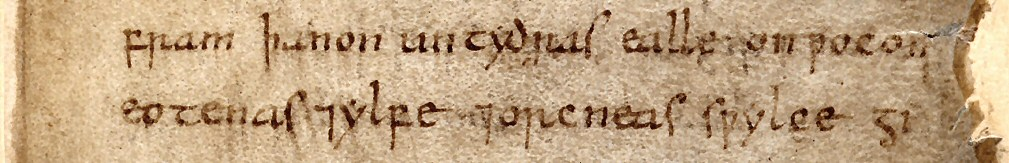
Beowulf's eotenas [ond] ylfe [ond] orcneas in line 112, "ettens [and] elves [and] demon-corpses" helped to inspire Tolkien to create Orcs, Elves, and other races. Cotton MS Vitellius A xv – f134r in British Library

Tolkien made use of his philological expertise on Beowulf to create some of the races of Middle-earth. The list of supernatural creatures in Beowulf, eotenas ond ylfe ond orcnéas, "ettens and elves and demon-corpses", contributed to his Orcs, and Elves, and to an allusion to Ettens in his "Ettenmoors" placename. His tree-giants or Ents (etymologically close to Ettens) may derive from a phrase in another Old English poem, Maxims II, orþanc enta geweorc, "skilful work of giants". Shippey suggests that Tolkien took the name of the tower of Orthanc (orþanc) from the same phrase, reinterpreted as "Orthanc, the Ents' fortress".

=== Characters ===
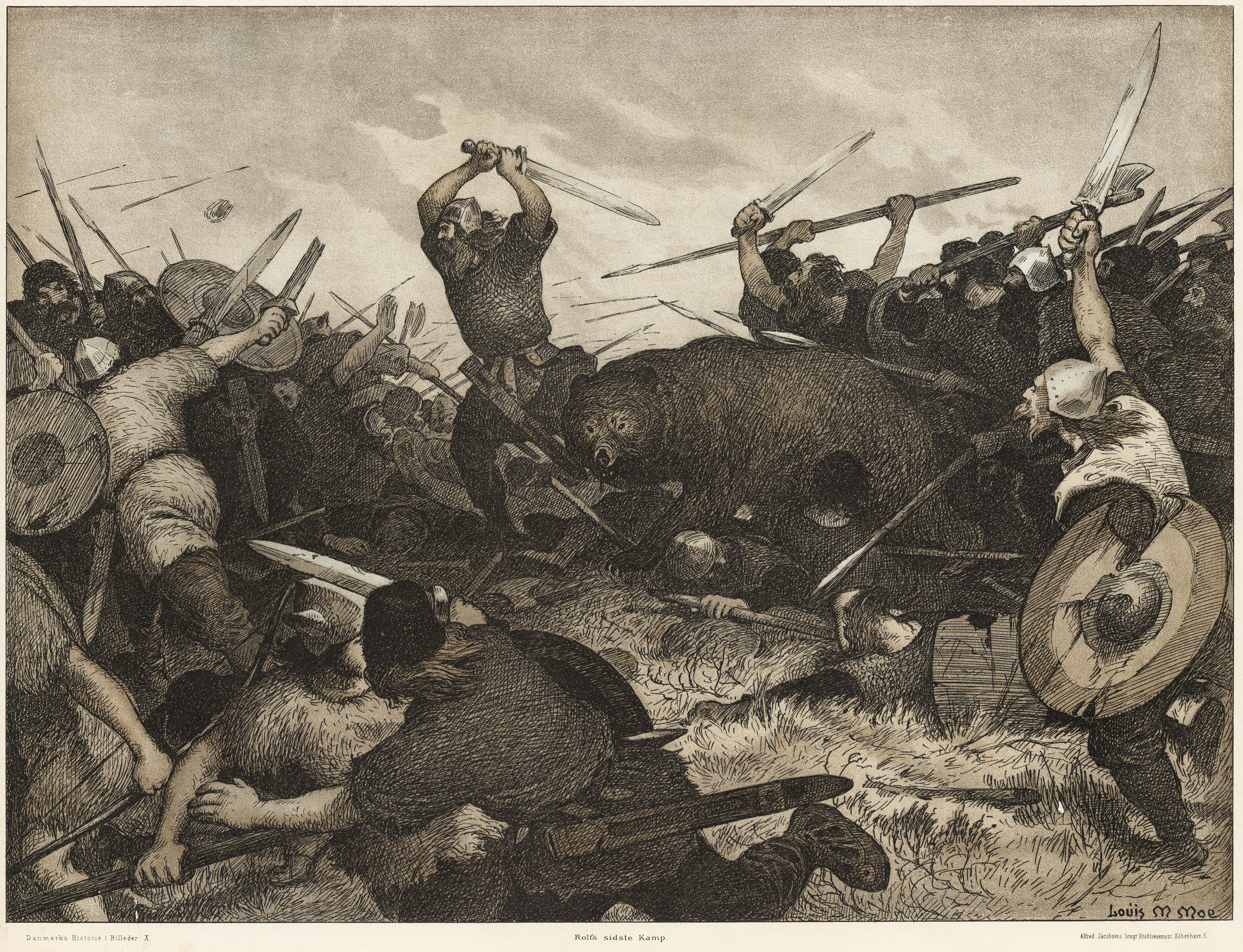
Beowulfian: Bödvar Bjarki shifts shape to fight in the form of a bear, as Tolkien's Beorn does. Painting by Louis Moe, 1898

The word orþanc occurs again in Beowulf, alongside the term searo in the phrase searonet seowed, smiþes orþancum, "a cunning-net sewn, by a smith's skill", meaning a mail-shirt or byrnie. Tolkien used searo in its Mercian form *saru for the name of Orthanc's ruler, the wizard Saruman, whose name could thus be translated "cunning man", incorporating the ideas of subtle knowledge and technology into Saruman's character.

An especially Beowulfian character appears in The Hobbit as Beorn; his name originally meant "bear" but came to mean "man, warrior", giving Tolkien the chance to make the character a were-bear, able to shift his shape. A bear-man Bödvar Bjarki exists in Norse myth, while it is Beowulf himself whom Beorn echoes in the Old English poem. The name "Beowulf" can indeed be read as "the Bees' Wolf", that is, "the Honey-Eater". In other words, he is "the Bear", the man who is so strong that he snaps swords and tears off the arms of monsters with his enormous bear-like strength. Shippey notes that Beorn is ferocious, rude, and cheerful, characteristics that reflect his huge inner self-confidence—itself an aspect of northern heroic courage.

== Monsters ==
Scholars have compared several of Tolkien's monsters, including his Trolls, Gollum, and Smaug, to those in Beowulf.

=== Trolls ===
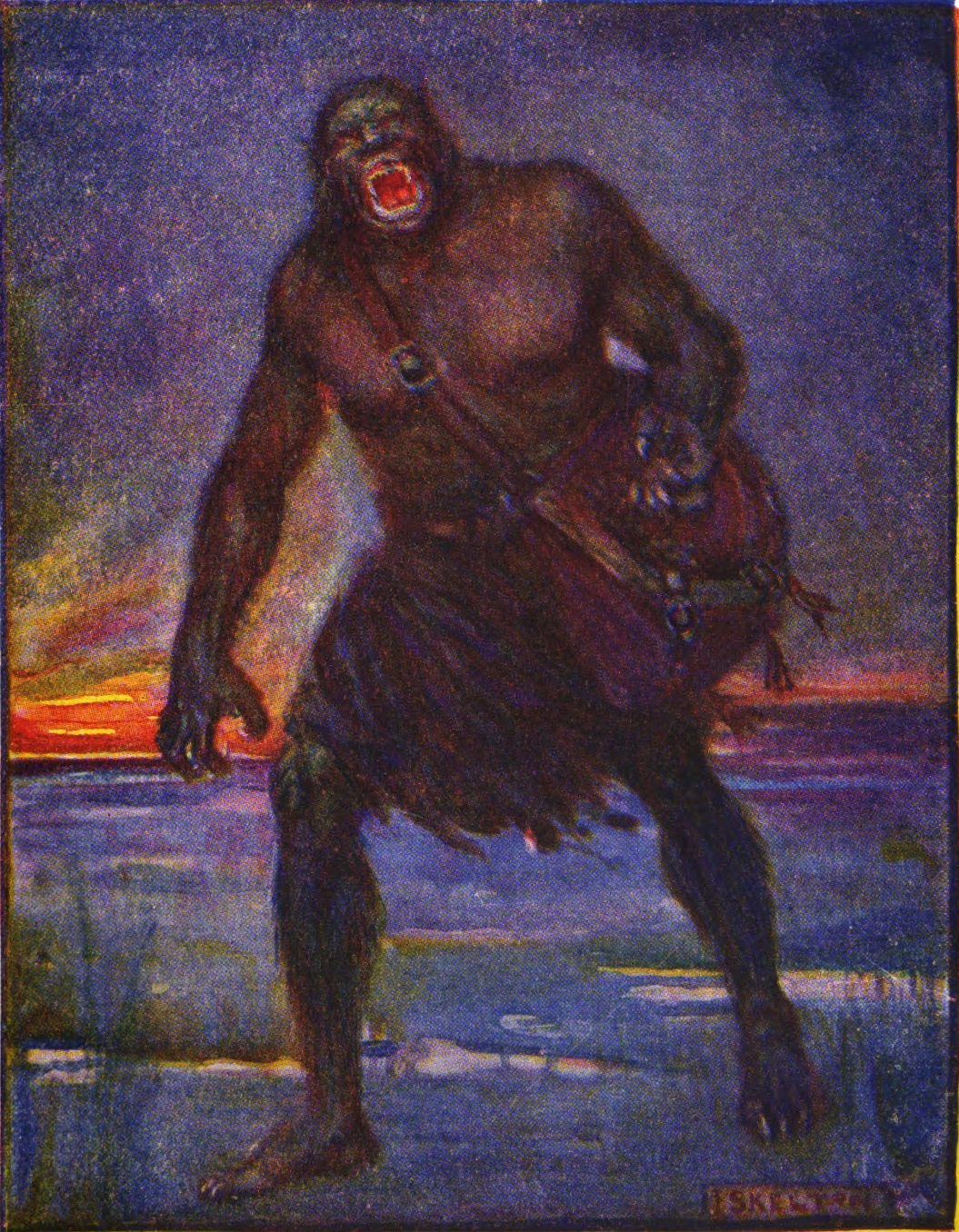
Tolkien's wordless trolls have been compared to Grendel, a monster in Beowulf. Illustration of Grendel by J. R. Skelton, 1908

Beowulf's first fight is with the monster Grendel, who is often taken by scholars as a kind of troll from Norse mythology. Tolkien's trolls share some of Grendel's attributes, such as great size and strength, being impervious to ordinary swords, and favouring the night. The scholar Christina Fawcett suggests that Tolkien's "roaring Troll" in The Return of the King reflects Grendel's "firey [sic] eye and terrible screaming". Noting that Tolkien compares them to beasts as they "came striding up, roaring like beasts ... bellowing", she observes that they "remain wordless warriors, like Grendel".

=== Gollum ===
Gollum, a far smaller monster in Middle-earth, has also been likened to Grendel, with his preference for hunting with his bare hands and his liking for desolate, marshy places. The many parallels between these monsters include their affinity for water, their isolation from society, and their bestial description. The Tolkien scholar Verlyn Flieger suggests that he is Tolkien's central monster-figure, likening him to both Grendel and the dragon; she describes him as "the twisted, broken, outcast hobbit whose manlike shape and dragonlike greed combine both the Beowulf kinds of monster in one figure".

Flieger's comparison of Gollum with Grendel and the Beowulf dragon
Grendel	Gollum	the Beowulf dragon
Man-eating	Cannibalistic, eats goblins, hobbits if no fish to eat	—
"Outcast, a wanderer in the waste, of the race of Cain"	Murderer, outcast	—
Unable to bear the sound of human pleasure with harp music	A small corner of his mind could still enjoy "a kindly voice ... but that ... would only make the evil part of him angrier in the end"	—
—	Greed for the Ring	Greed for treasure
—	Transformed by greed for ring into a creeping thing, his OE name Smeagol meaning "creeping"	(Fafnir changed himself into a dragon to guard his gold and his ring)
—	His name for the ring, "Precious", is OE māþum	māþum is dragon's hoard

=== Smaug ===
Tolkien made use of the Beowulf dragon to create one of his most distinctive monsters, the dragon in The Hobbit, Smaug. The Beowulf dragon is aroused and enraged by the theft of a golden cup from his pile of treasure; he flies out in the night and destroys Beowulf's hall; he is killed, but the treasure is cursed, and Beowulf too dies. In The Hobbit, the eponymous Hobbit protagonist Bilbo accordingly steals a golden cup from the dragon's huge mound of treasure, awakening Smaug, who flies out and burns Lake-town; the allure of gold is too much of a temptation for the Dwarf Thorin Oakenshield, who is killed soon afterwards. On the other hand, the Beowulf dragon does not speak; Tolkien has made Smaug conversational, and wily with it. Scholars have analysed the parallels between Smaug and the unnamed Beowulf dragon:

Lee and Solopova's comparison of Smaug and the Beowulf dragon
Plot element	Beowulf	The Hobbit
Aggressive dragon	eald uhtsceaða ... hat ond hreohmod ... Wæs þæs wyrmes wig / wide gesyne "old twilight-ravager ... hot and fierce-minded ... that worm's war was / widely seen"	Smaug fiercely attacks Dwarves, Laketown
Gold-greedy dragon	hordweard "treasure-guardian"	Smaug watchfully sleeps on a pile of treasure
Provoking the dragon	wæs ða gebolgen / beorges hyrde, wolde se laða / lige forgyldan drincfæt dyre. "was then furious / the barrow's keeper wanted the enemy / with fire to revenge precious drinking-cup."	Smaug is enraged when Bilbo steals a golden cup
Night-flying dragon	nacod niðdraca, nihtes fleogeð fyre befangen "naked hate-dragon, flying by night, wreathed in fire"	Smaug attacks Laketown with fire, by night
Well-protected dragon's lair	se ðe on heaum hofe / hord beweotode, stanbeorh steapne; stig under læg, eldum uncuð. "the one who on high heath / hoard watched steep stone-barrow / the path up to it unknown to any."	Secret passage to Smaug's lair and a mound of treasure in the stone palace under Mount Erebor
Accursed dragon-gold	hæðnum horde "a heathen hoard"	The treasure provokes the Battle of Five Armies

== Culture of Rohan ==
=== Names, language, and heroism ===
Tolkien made use of Beowulf, along with other Old English sources, for many aspects of the Riders of Rohan. Their land was the Mark, its name a version of the Mercia where he lived, in Mercian dialect *Marc. Their names are straightforwardly Old English: Éomer and Háma (characters in Beowulf), Éowyn ("Horse-joy"), Théoden ("King"). So too is their language, with words like Éothéod ("Horse-people"), Éored ("Troop of cavalry"), and Eorlingas ("people of Eorl", whose name means "[Horse-]lord", cf. Earl), where many words and names begin with the word for "horse", eo[h].

There are even spoken phrases that follow this form. As Alaric Hall notes, "'Westu Théoden hál!' cried Éomer" is a scholarly joke: a dialectal form of Beowulf's Wæs þú, Hróðgár, hál ("Be thou well, Hrothgar!") i.e. Éomer shouts "Long Live King Théoden!" in a Mercian accent. Tolkien used this West Midlands dialect of Old English because he had been brought up in that region.

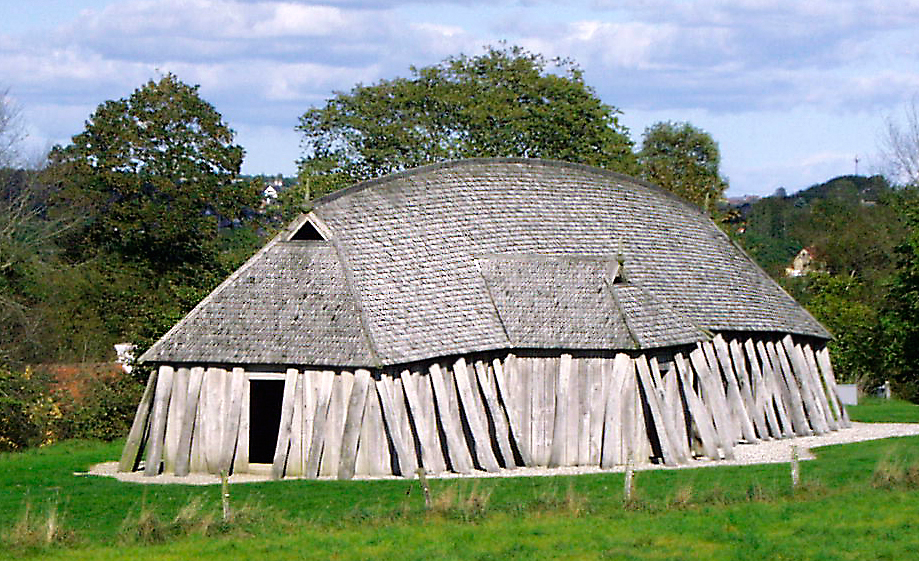
The royal palace of Rohan, Meduseld, is a Viking-style mead hall, like Hrothgar's hall, Heorot, described in Beowulf. Depicted is a reconstructed Viking longhouse in Denmark.

Théoden's hall, Meduseld, (Note: Meduseld means "mead hall" in Beowulf.) is modelled on Beowulf's Heorot, as is the way it is guarded, with visitors challenged repeatedly but courteously. Heorot's golden thatched roof is described in line 311 of Beowulf which Tolkien directly translates as a description of Meduseld: "The light of it shines far over the land", representing líxte se léoma ofer landa fela.

The war horns of the Riders of Rohan exemplify, in Shippey's view, the "heroic Northern world", as in what he calls the nearest Beowulf has to a moment of Tolkien-like eucatastrophe, when Ongentheow's Geats, trapped all night, hear the horns of Hygelac's men coming to rescue them; the Riders blow their horns wildly as they finally arrive, turning the tide of the Battle of the Pelennor Fields at a climactic moment in The Lord of the Rings.

=== Alliterative verse ===
Among the many poems in The Lord of the Rings are examples of Tolkien's skill in imitating Old English alliterative verse, keeping strictly to the metrical structure, which he described in his essay "On Translating Beowulf". The Tolkien scholar Mark Hall compares Aragorn's lament for Boromir to Scyld Scefing's ship-burial in Beowulf:

Mark Hall's comparison of the "Lament for Boromir" with the ship-burial in Beowulf
Beowulf 2:36b–42 Scyld Scefing's funeral	Hall's translation	"Lament for Boromir" (floated in a boat down the Anduin to the Falls of Rauros)
þær wæs madma fela of feorwegum frætwa gelæded; ne hyrde ic cymlicor ceol gegyrwan hildewæpnum ond heaðowædum, billum ond byrnum; him on bearme læg madma mænigo, þa him mid scoldon on flodes æht feor gewitan.	There was much treasure from faraway ornaments brought not heard I of more nobly a ship prepared war-weapons and war-armour sword and mail; on his lap lay treasures many those with him should on floods' possession far departed.	'Beneath Amon Hen I heard his cry. There many foes he fought. His cloven shield, his broken sword, they to the water brought. His head so proud, his face so fair, his limbs they laid to rest; And Rauros, golden Rauros-falls, bore him upon its breast.'

== Style ==
=== Impression of depth ===
The many digressions in Beowulf must have given its listeners a powerful impression of looking into a noble pagan past. Illustration by J. R. Skelton, c. 1909

A quality of literature that Tolkien particularly prized, and sought to achieve in The Lord of the Rings, was the impression of depth, of hidden vistas into ancient history. He found this especially in Beowulf, but also in other works that he admired, such as Virgil's Aeneid, Shakespeare's Macbeth, Sir Orfeo, and Grimms' Fairy Tales. Beowulf contains numerous digressions into other stories which have functions other than advancing the plot, in Adrien Bonjour's words rendering "the background of the poem extraordinarily alive", (Note: Nagy cites Bonjour, Adrien (1950). The Digressions in 'Beowulf'. Basil Blackwell. OCLC 1031688621.) and providing contrasts and examples that repeatedly illuminate the key points of the main story with flashes of the distant past. Tolkien stated in The Monsters and the Critics that Beowulf:

must have succeeded admirably in creating in the minds of the poet's contemporaries the illusion of surveying a past, pagan but noble and fraught with a deep significance – a past that itself had depth and reached backward into a dark antiquity of sorrow. This impression of depth is an effect and a justification of the use of episodes and allusions to old tales, mostly darker, more pagan, and desperate than the foreground.

In addition, Tolkien valued particularly the "shimmer of suggestion" that never exactly becomes explicit, but that constantly hints at greater depth. That is just as in Beowulf, where Tolkien described the quality as the "glamour of Poesis", though whether this was, Shippey notes, an effect of distance in time, the "elvish hone of antiquity", or a kind of memory or vision of paradise is never distinguished.

=== Elegiac tone ===
The Lord of the Rings, especially its last part, The Return of the King, has a consistent elegiac tone, in this resembling Beowulf. The Tolkien scholar Marjorie Burns describes it as a "sense of inevitable disintegration". The author and scholar Patrice Hannon calls it "a story of loss and longing, punctuated by moments of humor and terror and heroic action but on the whole a lament for a world—albeit a fictional world—that has passed even as we seem to catch a last glimpse of it flickering and fading".

== "Large symbolism" ==
Shippey notes that Tolkien wrote of Beowulf that the "large symbolism is near the surface, but ... does not break through, nor become allegory", for if it did, that would constrain the story, like that of The Lord of the Rings, to have just one meaning. That sort of constraint was something that Tolkien "contemptuously" dismissed in his foreword to the second edition, stating that he preferred applicability, giving readers the freedom to read into the novel what they could see in it. The message could be hinted at, repeatedly, and they would work, Shippey writes, "only if they were true both in fact and in fiction"; Tolkien set out to make The Lord of the Rings work the same way.

=== A learned Christian's heroic world ===
Another theme, in both Beowulf and The Lord of the Rings, is that of the good pagan pre-Catholics such as Aragorn, who would on a strict interpretation of Christianity be damned as they had no knowledge of Christ. Tolkien stated in a letter to his friend the Jesuit priest Robert Murray that he had cut religion out of the work because it "is absorbed into the story and the symbolism". George Clark writes that Tolkien saw the Beowulf poet as

a learned Christian who re-created a heroic world and story in an implicitly Christian universe governed by a God whose existence and nature the poem's wiser characters intuit without the benefit of revelation. Tolkien's Beowulf poet was a version of himself, and his authorial persona in creating [The Lord of the Rings] was a version of that Beowulf poet.

=== Contrasted heroes ===
Flieger contrasts the warrior-hero Aragorn with the suffering hero Frodo. Aragorn is, like Beowulf, an epic/romance hero, a bold leader and a healer-king. Frodo is "the little man of fairy tale", the little brother who unexpectedly turns out to be brave. But the fairy tale happy ending comes to Aragorn, marrying the beautiful princess (Arwen) and winning the kingdom (Gondor and Arnor); while Frodo gets "defeat and disillusionment—the stark, bitter ending typical of the Iliad, Beowulf, the Morte D'Arthur". In other words, the two types of hero are not only contrasted, but combined, halves of their legends swapped over.

Flieger's analysis of heroes in Beowulf, fairy tales, and The Lord of the Rings
Beowulf	Fairy tale hero	Aragorn	Frodo
Bold hero, victorious	—	Battle of Helm's Deep, Battle of the Pelennor Fields	—
—	Small beginnings: Little man sets out on quest	—	Hobbit sets out not knowing where he's going
Bitter ending	—	—	Defeat and disillusionment after the quest
—	Happy ending: Returns home rich, marries princess	King of Gondor and Arnor; Marries Elf-princess Arwen	—

=== The road of life ===
The symbolism of the road of life can be glimpsed in many places, illuminating different aspects. Tolkien's poem The Old Walking Song is repeated, with variations, three times in The Lord of the Rings. The last version contains the words "The Road goes ever on and on / Out from the door where it began. ... But I at last with weary feet / Will turn towards the lighted inn". Shippey writes that "if 'the lighted inn' on the road means death, then 'the Road' must mean life", and the poem and the novel could be speaking of the process of psychological individuation. Beowulf, too, concerns the life and death of its hero. Flieger writes that Tolkien saw Beowulf as "a poem of balance, the opposition of ends and beginnings": the young Beowulf rises, sails to Denmark, kills Grendel, becomes King; many years later, the old Beowulf falls, killing the dragon but going to his own death. In Flieger's view, Tolkien has built the same values, balance, and opposition into The Lord of the Rings, but at the same time rather than one after the other.

=== Lost paradise ===
A crux at the start of the poem concerns the origin, and fate, of Scyld Scefing. Line 44 uses the plural pronoun þā ("those") for whoever it was that sent Scyld in a boat to the Scyldings, and who receive his funeral ship when they send him off. The cosmology of this story is not explained, beyond the cryptic statement that "those" had sent Scyld as a baby into the world. Shippey notes that the pronoun is, unusually for such an insignificant part of speech, both stressed and alliterated, a heavy emphasis (marked in the text):

The Scyldings let Scyld's funeral ship sail by itself back to whoever he came from
Beowulf lines 43–52

Nalæs hī hine lǣssan / lācum tēodan,
þeodgestrēonum, / þon þā dydon
þē hine æt frumsceafte / forð onsendon
ǣnne ofer ǣðe / umborwesende.
þā gǣt hīe him āsetton / segen geldenne
hēah ofer hēafod, / lēton holm beran,
gēafon on gārsecg; / him wæs geōmor sefa,
murnende mōd. / Men ne cunnon
secgan tŏ sōðe, / selerǣdende,
hæleð under heofenum, / hwā þǣm hlæste onfēng.

John Porter's "literal" 1991 translation

In no way they him less / with gifts endowed,
with folk-wealth, / than those did,
who him at outset / forth sent
alone over waves / infant-being.
Then yet they set up / standard golden
high over head, / they let sea carry,
gave to ocean; / in them was gloomy heart,
mourning mind. / Men not can
say for truth, / hall-counsellors,
heroes under heaven, who that cargo received.

In The Lost Road and Other Writings, Christopher Tolkien quotes from one of his father's lectures: "the [Beowulf] poet is not explicit, and the idea was probably not fully formed in his mind—that Scyld went back to some mysterious land whence he had come. He came out of the Unknown beyond the Great Sea, and returned into It". J. R. R. Tolkien explains that "the symbolism (what we should call the ritual) of a departure over the sea whose further shore was unknown; and an actual belief in a magical land or otherworld located 'over the sea', can hardly be distinguished."

Shippey comments that a ship-burial must have meant "a belief that the desired afterworld was across the western sea", and that Tolkien mirrored this with his "Undying Lands" of Valinor that once lay across the sea from Middle-earth. In short, the Beowulf poet had "what one can only call an inkling of Tolkien's own image of 'the Lost Straight Road'." He asks who the unnamed beings were, and whether the ship was to sail into the West on a Lost Road to return to them. They are plainly acting on behalf of God; being plural, they cannot be him, but they are supernatural. He suggests that Tolkien considered their nature, as godlike mythological demiurges, and that this perhaps prompted him to create the similar Valar, given that Tolkien habitually "deriv[ed] inspiration from a philological crux".

== Sources ==
- Burns, Marjorie J. (1989). "J.R.R. Tolkien and the Journey North". Mythlore. 15 (4): 5–9. JSTOR 26811938. Archived from the original on 14 February 2021.
- Carpenter, Humphrey (1977). Tolkien: A Biography. New York: Ballantine Books. ISBN 978-0-04928-037-3.
- Carpenter, Humphrey, ed. (2023) [1981]. The Letters of J. R. R. Tolkien: Revised and Expanded Edition. New York: HarperCollins. ISBN 978-0-35-865298-4.
- Clark, George (2000). "Tolkien and the True Hero". In Clark, Sir George; Timmons, Daniel (eds.). J.R.R. Tolkien and His Literary Resonances: Views of Middle-earth. Santa Barbara, California: Greenwood. pp. 39–52. ISBN 978-0-31330-845-1.
- Evans, Jonathan (2000). "The Dragon-lore of Middle-earth: Tolkien and Old English and Old Norse tradition". In Clark, Sir George; Timmons, Daniel (eds.). J.R.R. Tolkien and His Literary Resonances: Views of Middle-earth. Santa Barbara, California: Greenwood. pp. 22–38. ISBN 978-0-31330-845-1.
- Fawcett, Christina (2014). J.R.R. Tolkien and the morality of monstrosity (PhD). University of Glasgow. Archived from the original on 3 February 2021.
- Flieger, Verlyn (2004). "Frodo and Aragorn: The Concept of the Hero". In Zimbardo, Rose A. & Isaacs, Neil D. (eds.). Understanding the Lord of the Rings: The Best of Tolkien Criticism. Houghton Mifflin. pp. 122–145. ISBN 978-0-61842-251-7.
- Hall, Alaric (2005). "Lord of the Rings, Lecture 4: 'Hobbits?' said Théoden. 'Your tongue is strangely changed.'". Alaric Hall. Archived from the original on 31 December 2005.
- Hall, Mark F. (2006). "The Theory and Practice of Alliterative Verse in the Work of J.R.R. Tolkien". Mythlore. 25 (1): 41–52. Archived from the original on 7 March 2021.
- Hannon, Patrice (2004). "The Lord of the Rings as Elegy". Mythlore. 24 (2): 36–42. Archived from the original on 8 February 2021.
- Kennedy, Michael (September 2001). "Tolkien and Beowulf – Warriors of Middle-earth". Amon Hen (171): 15–16. Archived from the original on 9 May 2006.
- Lee, Stuart D. & Solopova, Elizabeth (2005). The Keys of Middle-earth. London, England: Palgrave Macmillan. ISBN 978-1-13745-469-0.
- Liuzza, Roy M. (2013) [2000]. Beowulf: facing page translation (2nd ed.). Peterborough, Ontario: Broadview Press. ISBN 978-1-55481-113-7. Archived from the original on 25 February 2022.
- Nagy, Gergely (2003). "The great chain of reading: (inter-)textual relations and the technique of mythopoesis in the Turin Story". In Chance, Jane (ed.). Tolkien the Medievalist. Abingdon-on-Thames, England: Routledge. pp. 239–258. ISBN 978-1-13443-970-6. Archived from the original on 17 June 2020.
- Nelson, Brent (2008). "Cain-Leviathan Typology in Gollum and Grendel". Extrapolation. 49 (3): 466–485. doi:10.3828/extr.2008.49.3.8.
- Porter, John (2008). Beowulf: Text and Translation. Anglo-Saxon Books. ISBN 978-1-898281-48-1.
- Reynolds, Pat (2021). "Death and funerary practices in Middle-earth" (PDF). The Tolkien Society. Archived (PDF) from the original on 23 November 2020.
- Shippey, Tom (2001). J. R. R. Tolkien: Author of the Century. HarperCollins. ISBN 978-0-26110-401-3.
- Shippey, Tom (2005) [1982]. The Road to Middle-Earth: How J. R. R. Tolkien Created a New Mythology (Third ed.). HarperCollins. ISBN 978-0-261-10275-0.
- Shippey, Tom (2022). "'King Sheave' and 'The Lost Road'". In Ovenden, Richard; McIlwaine, Catherine (eds.). The Great Tales Never End: Essays in Memory of Christopher Tolkien. Bodleian Library Publishing. pp. 166–180. ISBN 978-1-8512-4565-9.
- Tolkien, J. R. R. (1954a). The Fellowship of the Ring. The Lord of the Rings. Boston: Houghton Mifflin. OCLC 9552942.
- Tolkien, J. R. R. (1954). The Two Towers. The Lord of the Rings. Boston: Houghton Mifflin. OCLC 1042159111.
- Tolkien, J. R. R. (1955). The Return of the King. The Lord of the Rings. Boston: Houghton Mifflin. OCLC 519647821.
- Tolkien, J. R. R. (1983). The Monsters and the Critics, and Other Essays. London: Allen & Unwin. OCLC 417591085.
- Tolkien, J. R. R. (1987). Christopher Tolkien (ed.). The Lost Road and Other Writings. Boston: Houghton Mifflin. ISBN 0-395-45519-7.
