= Legolas =

Fictional elf from Tolkien's legendarium

- Middle-earth character

In-universe information
- Aliases: Greenleaf (Legolas translated into English)
- Race: Sindar Elf
- Gender: Male
- Affiliation: Company of the Ring
- Home: Mirkwood
- Book(s): The Lord of the Rings

Legolas (Sindarin: [ˈlɛɡɔlas]) is a fictional character in J. R. R. Tolkien's The Lord of the Rings. He is a Sindar Elf of the Woodland Realm and son of its king, Thranduil, becoming one of the nine members of the Fellowship who set out to destroy the One Ring. Though Dwarves and Elves are traditionally rivals, he and the Dwarf Gimli form a close friendship during their travels together.

Commentators have noted that Legolas serves as a typical Elf in the story, demonstrating more-than-human abilities such as seeing farther than anyone else in Rohan and sensing the memory of a long-lost Elvish civilisation in the stones of Hollin.

== Fictional history ==
Legolas is the son of Thranduil, King of the Woodland Realm of Northern Mirkwood, (Note: Tolkien 1954a, book 2, ch. 2 "The Council of Elrond") who appeared as "the Elvenking" in The Hobbit. (Note: Tolkien 1937, ch. 8 "Flies and Spiders") Thranduil, one of the Sindar or "Grey Elves", (Note: Tolkien 1980, "The History of Galadriel and Celeborn", "Appendix B: The Sindarin Princes of the Silvan Elves") ruled over the Silvan Elves or "Wood-elves" of Mirkwood.

Legolas is introduced at the Council of Elrond in Rivendell, where he came as a messenger from his father to discuss Gollum's escape from their guard. Legolas was chosen to be a member of the Fellowship of the Ring, charged with destroying the One Ring. He accompanied the other members in their travels from Rivendell to Amon Hen. (Note: Tolkien 1954a, book 2, ch. 3 "The Ring Goes South") When the fellowship was trapped by a snowstorm while crossing the Misty Mountains, Legolas scouted ahead, running lightly over the snow, and told Aragorn and Boromir that the thick snow they were trying to push through was only a narrow wall. Back in the lowlands of Hollin, Legolas helped fend off an attack by Saruman's wargs. Gandalf then led the fellowship on a journey underground through Moria. (Note: Tolkien 1954a, book 2, ch. 4 "A Journey in the Dark") In Moria, Legolas helped fight off Orcs and recognized "Durin's Bane" as a Balrog. (Note: Tolkien 1954a, book 2, ch. 5 "The Bridge of Khazad-dûm") After Gandalf's fall, Aragorn led the Fellowship to the Elven realm of Lothlórien. Legolas spoke to the Elf-sentries there on behalf of the Fellowship. (Note: Tolkien 1954a, book 2, ch. 6 "Lothlórien")

There was initially friction between Legolas and the Dwarf Gimli, because of the ancient quarrel between Elves and Dwarves, rekindled by Thranduil's treatment of Gimli's father Glóin. Legolas and Gimli became friends when Gimli greeted Galadriel respectfully. When the fellowship left Lothlórien, Galadriel gave the members gifts; Legolas received a longbow, (Note: Tolkien 1954a, book 2, ch. 8 "Farewell to Lórien") which he used to bring down a Nazgûl's flying steed in the dark with one shot. (Note: Tolkien 1954a, book 2, ch. 9 "The Great River")

After Boromir's death and the capture of Merry Brandybuck and Pippin Took by orcs, Legolas, Aragorn, and Gimli set out across Rohan in pursuit of the two captured hobbits. (Note: Tolkien 1954, book 3, ch. 1 "The Departure of Boromir") In the forest of Fangorn Legolas and his companions met Gandalf, resurrected as "Gandalf the White", who delivered a message to Legolas from Galadriel. Legolas interpreted this as foretelling the end of his stay in Middle-earth:

Legolas Greenleaf long under tree,
In joy thou hast lived, Beware of the Sea!
If thou hearest the cry of the gull on the shore,
Thy heart shall then rest in the forest no more. (Note: Tolkien 1954, book 3, ch. 5 "The White Rider")

The three met with the Riders of Rohan, fought in the Battle of Helm's Deep, and witnessed Saruman's downfall at Isengard, where they were reunited with Merry and Pippin. (Note: Tolkien 1954, book 3, ch. 7 "Helm's Deep")

Legolas and Gimli accompanied Aragorn and the Grey Company on the Paths of the Dead. (Note: Tolkien 1955, book 5, ch. 2 "The Passing of the Grey Company") After Aragorn summoned the Dead of Dunharrow to fight for him, Legolas saw them terrify the Corsairs of Umbar from their ships at Pelargir. Galadriel's prophecy was fulfilled: as Legolas heard the cries of seagulls, he experienced the Sea-longing — the desire to sail west to Valinor, the "Blessed Realm", latent among his people. (Note: Tolkien 1955, book 5, ch. 9 "The Last Debate") He fought in the Battle of the Pelennor Fields (Note: Tolkien 1955, book 5, ch. 6 "The Battle of the Pelennor Fields") and at the Black Gate, (Note: Tolkien 1955, book 5, ch. 10 "The Black Gate Opens") and watched as Sauron was defeated and Barad-dûr collapsed. (Note: Tolkien 1955, book 6, ch. 4 "The Field of Cormallen")

After the destruction of the One Ring, Legolas remained in Minas Tirith for Aragorn's coronation and marriage to Arwen. Later, Legolas and Gimli travelled together through Fangorn forest and to the Glittering Caves of Aglarond, as Legolas had promised Gimli. (Note: Tolkien 1955, book 6, ch. 6 "Many Partings") Eventually Legolas brought south many Silvan Elves, and they dwelt in Ithilien, and it became once again the "fairest country in all the westlands." (Note: Tolkien 1955, "Appendix A, Annals of the Kings and Rulers") They stayed in Ithilien for "a hundred years of Men." After Aragorn dies, Legolas built a small ship and sailed West, reportedly taking Gimli with him.

== Analysis ==
The name Legolas Greenleaf first appeared in "The Fall of Gondolin", one of the "Lost Tales", circa 1917. The character, who guides survivors of the sack of the city to safety, is mentioned only once. (Note: Tolkien 1984b, The Fall of Gondolin)

The Tolkien scholar Christina Scull calls Legolas's friendship with the Dwarf Gimli "the greatest reconciliation theme in the book", given the distrust between their races since the First Age, when as she notes the Dwarves sacked Menegroth. Scull notes the tension when Legolas speaks of the "sorrow" after the Dwarves awakened evil in the Misty Mountains; and again when Gimli refuses a blindfold, and Legolas curses the "stiff necks" of the Dwarves. From there, the reconciliation forms a sharp contrast, after the Elf-lady Galadriel grants Gimli a strand of her hair; and Legolas finally accepts that Gimli has bested him in speech with his praise for the glittering Caves of Aglarond. Christina Casagrande comments that the friendship is fully mutual, as on occasion it is Gimli that follows Legolas, and on occasion the reverse; and the pattern is repeated by other pairs of characters, as in Mark Brian's words "Casagrande delightfully points out that even Sam is temporarily exalted to the office of 'master' [normally Frodo's role in the relationship] between Shelob's cave and the storming of Cirith Ungol."

Hannah Mendro notes of the friendship of Legolas and Gimli that "one of the last notes in the Red Book" describes it as "greater than any that has been between Elf and Dwarf. If this is true, then it is strange indeed: that a Dwarf should be willing to leave Middle-earth for any love, or that the Eldar should receive him, or that the Lords of the West should permit it. But it is said that Gimli went also out of desire to see again the beauty of Galadriel; and it may be that she, being mighty among the Eldar, obtained this grace for him. More cannot be said of this matter". Mendro comments that the friendship is "both strange and comforting, intensely intimate and oddly private, deeply committed and yet riddled with gaps. All of this makes them perfect candidates for a queer reading". Mendro observes that the friendship comes into being largely out of sight, as Legolas and Gimli often walk together in the forest of Lothlórien, to the surprise of the rest of the Company. The relationship is evidently close, and kept private. Mendro comments that the pair are in a way "the least significant members" of the Company, without the leadership role of Gandalf, the kingly destiny of Aragorn, or the Sauron-defeating roles of the Hobbits. They are, she writes, present at one event after another, but responding mainly to each other. This creates "both the queer potential and the queer deniability" of their relationship.

The medievalists Stuart D. Lee and Elizabeth Solopova note that Legolas's lament over the stones of the Elvish land of Hollin: "Only I hear the stones lament them: deep they delved us, fair they wrought us, high they builded us; but they are gone," recalls the Old English poem The Ruin. The Tolkien critic Paul Kocher writes of the same passage that it shows how Elves such as Legolas have senses keener than mortal Men: he can see further and can even hear the stones lamenting the passing of the Elves. In Kocher's view, Legolas is an "emissary for the Elves", as Gimli is for the dwarves; he suggests that the point Tolkien was making was that Legolas was a typical young elf.

The Tolkien scholar Tom Shippey observes that Legolas, describing the great hall of Meduseld in the capital of Rohan, too far off for any but an Elf to make out clearly, speaks a line which is a direct translation of one from Beowulf: "The light of it shines far over the land", líxte se léoma ofer landa fela. (Note: Tolkien 1954, book 3, ch. 6 "The King of the Golden Hall")

== Adaptations ==
Legolas in Ralph Bakshi's 1978 animated version of The Lord of the Rings

Legolas was voiced by Anthony Daniels in Ralph Bakshi's 1978 animated version of The Lord of the Rings. In the film, he takes Glorfindel's place in the "Flight to the Ford"; he meets Aragorn and the hobbits on their way to Rivendell and sets Frodo on his horse before Frodo is chased by the Nazgûl to the ford of Bruinen.

Orlando Bloom as Legolas in Peter Jackson's The Lord of the Rings: The Two Towers

Legolas was voiced by David Collings in the 1981 BBC Radio 4 adaptation. In the 1993 Finnish miniseries Hobitit he was portrayed by Ville Virtanen.

In Peter Jackson's The Lord of the Rings movie trilogy (2001–2003), Legolas was portrayed by Orlando Bloom. He was presented as an unstoppable fighter, performing dramatic feats of battle. Bloom reprised this role in Jackson's 2013 release The Hobbit: The Desolation of Smaug and again for the 2014 follow-up The Hobbit: The Battle of the Five Armies. Legolas's role in The Hobbit films is an addition, as he did not appear in the novel. He is attracted to the non-canon elf-woman Tauriel.

In the West End musical, The Lord of the Rings: The Musical, Legolas was portrayed by Michael Rouse. Legolas appeared as a playable character in Lego Dimensions as an expansion character, bundled with an arrow launcher.

== Sources ==
- Tolkien, J. R. R. (1937). The Hobbit. United Kingdom: George Allen & Unwin.
- Tolkien, J. R. R. (1954a). The Fellowship of the Ring. The Lord of the Rings. Boston: Houghton Mifflin. OCLC 9552942.
- Tolkien, J. R. R. (1954). The Two Towers. The Lord of the Rings. Boston: Houghton Mifflin. OCLC 1042159111.
- Tolkien, J. R. R. (1955). The Return of the King. The Lord of the Rings. Boston: Houghton Mifflin. OCLC 519647821.
- Tolkien, J. R. R. (1980). Christopher Tolkien (ed.). Unfinished Tales. Boston: Houghton Mifflin. ISBN 978-0-395-29917-3.
- Tolkien, J. R. R. (1984b). Christopher Tolkien (ed.). The Book of Lost Tales. Vol. 2. Boston: Houghton Mifflin. ISBN 0-395-36614-3.
