= A Companion to J. R. R. Tolkien =

2014 scholarly book edited by Stuart D. Lee

- Editor: Stuart D. Lee
- Language: English
- Series: Blackwell Companions to Literature and Culture
- Subject: J. R. R. Tolkien
- Publisher: Wiley-Blackwell
- Publication date: 2014
- Publication place: United States
- Media type: Hardcover
- Pages: 602
- ISBN: 9780470659823
- OCLC: 1204367569

A Companion to J. R. R. Tolkien is a 2014 book edited by Stuart D. Lee and published by Wiley-Blackwell. It is a part of the Blackwell Companions to Literature series, which have been described as prestigious reference works, and features authors well known in the field of Tolkien studies.

Reviewers praised the book as a careful work and a valuable guide to the topic area. Andrew Higgins writing for the Journal of Tolkien Research noted the distinguished line-up of scholarly contributors, and called it "joyous indeed" that Tolkien had finally attained acceptance by the literary establishment as measured by having a Blackwell Companion to his name.

== Context ==
Wiley Blackwell has published some 90 titles in its Companions to Literature and Culture series. These cover topics such as medieval poetry, the American short story, or the British and Irish novel; and major authors such as Mark Twain, T. S. Eliot, Thomas Hardy, James Joyce, John Milton, Geoffrey Chaucer, and William Shakespeare.

J. R. R. Tolkien (1892–1973) was an English Roman Catholic writer, poet, philologist, and academic, best known as the author of the high fantasy works The Hobbit and The Lord of the Rings.

== Book ==
Wiley Blackwell published the Companion to J. R. R. Tolkien in hardback in 2014, and in paperback in 2020. A second edition appeared in 2022.

The volume begins with a 12-page chronological table of Tolkien's life and works, and an editorial introduction by Stuart D. Lee. The rest of the book is divided into five main thematic areas: Life, The Academic, The Legendarium, Context and Critical Approaches. The first part, a single chapter, is a brief biography by John Garth, summarising the diverse elements of Tolkien's life from the youthful Tea Club and Barrovian Society and wartime experience to lexicography, Oxford, The Hobbit, and his other writings. The second part has three essays by scholars including Thomas Honegger who examines Tolkien's academic, often philological, writings, and Tom Shippey who writes about "Tolkien as editor", looking at a writing career with many false starts. The third part contains fourteen contributions, by Gergely Nagy, John D. Rateliff, Verlyn Flieger and others on the complex body of stories, many times rewritten, that make up his Middle-earth corpus. The fourth part consists of ten essays, including those by Elizabeth Solopova on Middle English, David Bratman on Tolkien's place among the Inklings, and Dimitra Fimi's look at his impact on fantasy fiction. The final part is of twelve essays, examining the varied and sometimes hostile response to Tolkien, and the key elements such as Catholicism, war (by Janet Brennan Croft), the role of women, fantasy artists' responses to Middle-earth, and music in his fiction.

The work is illustrated with a few tables in the text, and in the "Art" essay by Christopher Tuthill, present in the final section, nine monochrome reproductions of fantasy artworks by major Tolkien artists such as Alan Lee, John Howe, and Ted Nasmith.

== Reception ==
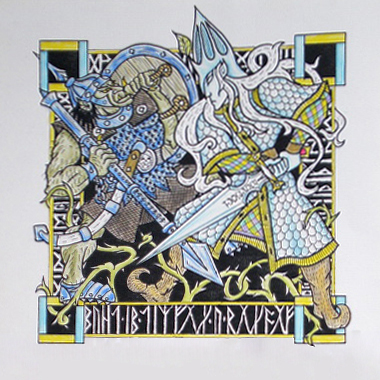
Tolkien's Middle-earth legendarium has inspired numerous responses from fantasy artists, here Tom Loback's Thingol Fights Boldog. The battle between the Elf-King and the Orc chieftain is described in The Lay of Leithian.

The Tolkien scholar Jason Fisher, reviewing the book for Mythlore, called it a "sign of the growing maturity of Tolkien studies". Observing that Lee had felt it necessary to apologise for a literary study of Tolkien; in response, Fisher commented it was time to "shake off this defensive note fifty years on" and ignore "those stodgy keepers of the canon who still dismiss Tolkien". He stated that the book's "careful organization" means less repetition than in most works with many contributors, while its use of established experts "immediately conveys authority and confidence in the quality of the work". He then reviewed each essay, remarking among many other things that Shippey both "gently reproaches the dilatory Tolkien on the one hand and praises his meticulous academic exertion". He praises Nagy for his "thought-provoking conclusions" on The Silmarillion, such as that Tolkien's failure to complete it actually made literal his "conception of his fiction as a philological corpus". He found Rateliff's summary of his own The History of the Hobbit excellent, even if he perhaps over-apologised to "film firsters" for how slowly the book built up to the action. He questions whether many readers would need five chapters on the languages such as Old Norse, Finnish, and "Celtic" [Welsh and Irish] that influenced Tolkien, but welcomed the "extended explorations". He found Bratman's coverage of the Inklings and Tolkien's wider milieu valuable, and likewise Fimi's analysis of Tolkien's legacy among writers, both imitators and those such as Alan Garner, Ursula Le Guin, Philip Pullman, and J. K. Rowling who recognised their debt to him while finding "their own distinct storytelling expression".

The scholar Jorge Luis Bueno-Alonso, reviewing A Companion to J. R. R. Tolkien for Tolkien Studies, described Lee as "one of the outstanding names of recent Tolkien critical scholarship and co-author of one of the most imaginative books on the relationships between Tolkien's fiction and medieval English literature". Of the book, he wrote that it brought order to the morass of publications on Tolkien, and noted that it finally brought Tolkien into the canon of Anglo-American studies as it was one of the "prestigious" Blackwell Companion series. He called the challenge of making a brief 25-page overview of Tolkien's life, undertaken by John Garth in the volume, "an enta geweorc", ("a work of giants").

Andrew Higgins, a Tolkien scholar, reviewing the book for the Journal of Tolkien Research, welcomed the "eminent line-up" of authors (naming among others Shippey, Flieger, Fimi, Rateliff and Nagy) who contributed to the work, and called it "joyous indeed that after many years of polite (and not so polite) disdain and dismissal by establishment 'academics' and the 'cultural intelligentsia'", Tolkien had reached the "academic pantheon" of Blackwell Companions. Higgins provided his own detailed reviews of all of the work's 36 articles, and applauded Lee for "the overall thematic structuring of this volume, which offers a progressive profile of Tolkien the man, the student and scholar, and the mythopoeist", and said that he "found Lee's ordering of these papers most helpful". He nonetheless observed that there are a few minor gaps in the coverage of the volume, such as no discussion of the foreign language adaptations of Tolkien's work or the significance of Beowulf as an influence on Tolkien, plus the need to update the volume with the analysis of Tolkien's The Fall of Arthur, a poem published only in 2013.

The scholar of literature and curator of rare books Cait Coker, in her review for Extrapolation, wrote that the discipline of Tolkien studies had come of age, from being the "bad boy" of academic inquiry into science fiction and fantasy. In her view, this Blackwell volume "aptly illustrates the singular author's claim on greatness".

== Bibliography ==
- Lee, Stuart D., ed. (2020) [2014]. A Companion to J. R. R. Tolkien. Wiley Blackwell. ISBN 978-1119656029. OCLC 1183854105.
