= Cosijn =

Cosijn is a Dutch surname. Notable people with the surname include:

- Jan Cosijn (1646–1708), Flemish sculptor and architect
- Lies Cosijn (1931–2016), Dutch ceramist
- P. J. Cosijn (1840–1899), Dutch scholar of Anglo-Saxon literature
