= Maxims (Old English poems) =

Old English gnomic poems

"Maxims I" and "Maxims II"
- Author(s): Unknown
- Language: Old English
- Date: Unknown
- Manuscript(s): Exeter Book ("Maxims I"), London, BL, Cotton Tiberius B.i. ("Maxims II")
- Genre: Gnomic poetry
- Verse form: Alliterative verse

"Maxims I" (sometimes treated as three separate poems, "Maxims I, A, B and C") and "Maxims II" are pieces of Old English gnomic poetry. The poem "Maxims I" can be found in the Exeter Book and "Maxims II" is located in a lesser known manuscript, London, British Library, Cotton Tiberius B i. "Maxims I" and "Maxims II" are classified as wisdom poetry, being both influenced by wisdom literature, such as the Havamal of ancient Germanic literature. Although they are separate poems of diverse contents, they have been given a shared name because the themes throughout each of the poems are similar.

== "Maxims I" ==
"Maxims I" can be found on folio 88b of the Exeter Book, beginning 'Frige mec froþum'. It may be divided into three sections or three separate poems, "Maxims I A, B, and C": with B starting 'Forst sceal feosan' on fol. 90a, and C beginning 'Ræd sceal mon secgan...' at fol. 91a.

The author(s) of this poem is unknown. The poem was copied down in the Exeter Book in the latter half of the tenth century. Its original date of composition is unknown, though Leonard Neidorf has recently adduced lexical, metrical, and cultural reasons to believe that the poem was first composed in either the seventh or the eighth century. The maxims in "Maxims I" discuss topics ranging from the afterlife, nature, and the social standing of women. "In the man, martial warlike arts must burgeon; and the woman must excel as one cherished among her people, and be buoyant of mood, keep confidences, be open-heartedly generous with horses and with treasures..."

These maxims are also called gnomes. The idea of gnomic literature dates back to Aristotle, who defined a gnome as "A statement not relating to particulars, as e.g. the character of Iphicrates, but to universals; yet not to all universals indiscriminately, as e.g. that straight is the opposite of crooked, but to all such as are the objects of (human) action and are to be chosen or avoided in our doings". Since the material in "Maxims I" is sententious in its character, it is regarded as gnomic poetry as opposed to a collection of proverbs or merely wise sayings.

"Maxims I" is divided into three sections. The opening section begins with a dialogue in which the writer espouses a wisdom contest found in other Old English texts. The middle section discusses natural phenomena such as frost and the seasons, as well as containing a passage about a man's wife welcoming him home from a long journey. The final section contains a comparison of Woden, the creator of idols, to the god of Christianity, who formed the earth and everything in it. "Woden fashioned idols, the Ruler of all fashioned heaven and the spacious skies". This section also consists of reflections of those who have been exiled, the comfort of song, and the need for courage in daily life.

== "Maxims II" ==
Stanley Greenfield and Richard Evert, in their article "Maxims II: Gnome and Poem" characterize the poem "Maxims II" as possessing "a rambling style which covers a great deal of ground, yet never reaches any particular goal". Some view "Maxims II" as being similar to how a compilation of poetry is written and edited. For example, Henk Aertsen and Rolf Bremmer, in their Companion to Old English Poetry, state, "lack of unity characterizes these lines". Still other critics disagree. A. P. M. Orchard in Medieval England: an Encyclopedia comments, "It can be argued that each maxim is implicitly linked to its neighbor and that, far from being a haphazard list of commonplaces, "Maxims II" (like "Maxims I") has a coherent organic structure”.

It is widely believed that "Maxims II" was influenced by the monks who copied it, since it contains gnomes of a religious nature. "Maxims II" states, "The shape of the future is obscure and unknowable; the Lord alone knows it, the Redeeming Father". Compared with the Old Testament proverb, "Do not boast about tomorrow, for you do not know what a day may bring forth" (Proverbs 27:1, Old Testament, NIV), one can readily see the influence of Christianity on the poem. When reading "Maxims II", the organisation and themes of the poem are not readily visible. For example, Paul Cavill writes that the argument of the apparent disjointedness of the poem is important because the poet pits Christ and Fate against each other, thus illustrating the traditional nature and remains of pagan belief in the poetry. Cavill cites the gnomes in "Maxims II", "... the powers of Christ are great, fate is strongest". However, most experts believe that the pagan material in the poems has been thoroughly worked over by their Christian redactors.

== Similarities between "Maxims I" and "Maxims II" ==
In "Maxims I", the Old English verbs biþ (implying an actual and ongoing state of being) and sceal (stating what ought to be the case) are used repeatedly throughout the first and second sections. Byþ and sceal are an important aspect of the Maxims II. Many people who study these poems and the themes that exist between both the Maxims I and the Maxims II poems discuss this topic. These words are translated for byþ as “be” and for sceal as “shall”. This, however, causes an issue because these translations are not always helpful in context. Marie Nelson suggests that the verb sceal can also be translated to “shall be”, which then raises the “question of whether futurity or necessity is implied.” Nelson sees that the problem may cause an issue in the meaning of the translation and may confuse the reader. As it remains, the two words are most clearly understood as "what is" and "what should be." (M. Nelson, ' "Is" and "Ought" in the Exeter Book Maxims', Southern Folklore Quarterly 45 (1981), 109-21) The poem combines observations about the world with small stories and moral statements. "Maxims II" does much the same. These poems are part of the genre known as wisdom literature, found in many different cultures, and can also be compared to the method used by Christ by using everyday situations to explain deeper truths. The influence of the Christian monks who copied it upon the traditional material in the poems may thus be seen.

In addition to providing moral guidance and precepts for everyday life, both "Maxims" poems "organize things and people into categories, catalogue trade rules, and list things as diverse as skills, fates, and rune names". As mentioned previously, the references to common occurrences in nature and society made the poems of general interest, though both poems also describe proper behaviour for the aristocracy of the day as well. The reference in "Maxims I" of "A king has to procure a queen with payment, with goblets and with rings". and in "Maxims II" the gnome "The king belongs in his hall, sharing out rings". are evidence of this.

In addition, both poems contain themes that coincide with the most famous Old English poem Beowulf. "Maxims I" refers to Cain just as Beowulf does and contains maxims for the wife of a hero returning home from his exploits which is similar to Beowulf returning home from his adventures. Like Beowulf, "Maxims II" refers to a dragon. "The dragon belongs in its barrow, canny and jealous of its jewels". The dragon was not considered a fictional animal in this period, but a real part of the natural world – like other animals that Anglo-Saxons had heard of but not seen because they lived in other parts of the world.

== Influence on J.R.R. Tolkien ==
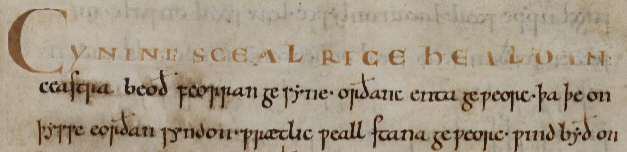
The phrase Orthanc enta geweorc, on the second line of the Old English Maxims II manuscript, seems to have inspired Tolkien.

The verse orþanc enta geweorc in Maxims II and similar phrases in The Ruin inspired J.R.R. Tolkien the names of the tower Orthanc and the tree-men Ents in The Lord of the Rings.

The Tolkien scholar Verlyn Flieger suggests that the form of the "Maxims" poems influenced a verse recited by the Ent Treebeard in Book III, chapter iv of The Two Towers. This begins:

Learn now the lore of Living Creatures!
First name the four, the free peoples:
Eldest of all, the elf-children;
Dwarf the delver, dark are his houses;
Ent the earthborn, old as mountains;
Man the mortal, master of horses:
