= Gergely Nagy (scholar) =

Medievalist and Tolkien scholar

Gergely Nagy is a Hungarian medievalist and a well-known Tolkien scholar.

== Biography ==
Gergely Nagy was born in Szeged, Hungary. Nagy gained his PhD at the University of Szeged, where he teaches on Tolkien and Plato.

Nagy has written numerous papers of Tolkien criticism. He contributed nine entries to the 2006 J. R. R. Tolkien Encyclopedia, and a chapter on The Silmarillion to the 2014 A Companion to J. R. R. Tolkien. Nagy was the keynote speaker for the 19th annual Tolkien conference at the University of Vermont in 2023. He has been described as an "especially well-known figure" in Tolkien scholarship who had made an "excellent contribution" to the book Sub-creating Arda. World-building in J.R.R. Tolkien's Work with his "usual skill and insight".

== Works ==
Nagy's many articles of Tolkien scholarship include:

- 2002 "The Great Chain of Reading: (Inter)Textual Relations and the Technique of Mythopoesis in the Túrin Story", In: Jane Chance (ed) Tolkien the Medievalist. London: Routledge, pp. 239-258.
- 2004 "The Adapted Text: The Lost Poetry of Beleriand", Tolkien Studies 1: pp. 21-41.
- 2004 "Saving the Myths: the Recreation of Mythology in Plato and Tolkien", In: Jane Chance (ed) Tolkien and the Invention of Myth: A Reader. University Press of Kentucky, 2004. pp. 81-100.
- 2005 "The Medievalist's Fiction: Textuality and Historicity as Aspects of Tolkien’s Medievalist Cultural Theory in a Postmodernist Context", In: Jane Chance, Alfred K. Siewers (ed) Tolkien's Modern Middle Ages. New York: Palgrave MacMillan, New-York, pp. 29-41.
- 2006 nine essays in The J. R. R. Tolkien Encyclopedia, including 'Gollum', 'Fictionality', 'Plato', and 'The Silmarillion'.
- 2006 "The 'Lost' Subject of Middle-earth. Elements and Motifs of the Constitution of the Subject in the Figure of Gollum in The Lord of the Rings", Tolkien Studies 3: pp. 57-79.
- 2013 "A Body of Myth: Representing Sauron in The Lord of the Rings", In: Christopher Vaccaro (ed) The Body in Tolkien's Legendarium: Essays on Middle-earth Corporeality. Jefferson, North Carolina: McFarland & Company, pp. 119-130.
- 2014 "The Silmarillion: Tolkien's Theory of Myth, Text, and Culture", in Stuart D. Lee (ed) A Companion to J. R. R. Tolkien, John Wiley & Sons.
