= Rolf Bremmer =

Dutch academic (born 1950)

Rolf Hendrik Bremmer Jr (born 13 August 1950, Zwolle) is a Dutch academic. He is professor of Old and Middle English, and extraordinary professor of Old Frisian, at Leiden University.

== Biography ==
Rolf Bremmer's father, also named Rolf Hendrik Bremmer (1917–1995), was a theologian and preacher associated with the Reformed Churches in the Netherlands (Liberated) and a student of Klaas Schilder. He married Lucie Gera Arina Lindeboom (b. 1918) in 1943 in The Hague; she was the daughter of a Reformed preacher (Cornelis Lindeboom). Rolf Jr.'s older brother J. N. Bremmer is professor of church history at the University of Groningen.

Bremmer received his master's degree in English language and literature from the University of Groningen in 1977. From 1976 to 1977, he studied at Oxford University as a Harting Student, with Anglo-Saxonists such as Bruce Mitchell, Tom Shippey, and J. M. Wallace-Hadrill. In 1986, he gained his PhD from Radboud University Nijmegen, with a dissertation on a late Middle English treatise on the five senses, directed by F. N. M. Diekstra.

Bremmer taught English from 1977 to 1979 at Gomarus College in Groningen, and Old and Middle English and historical linguistics at Radboud University from 1979 to 1986. Since 1986, he has been with Leiden University. In 1994, Bremmer was the Erasmus professor at Harvard for Dutch Culture and History. He is a premier Dutch authority on Frisian language and literature, occupying a special professorship in Frisian studies.

Bremmer has published and edited books on a variety of topics in Old English language and literature, Middle English language and literature, and Frisian language and literature. He has published on the 17th-century scholar and collector Franciscus Junius, he has translated the work on Beowulf by the Dutch Anglo-Saxon scholar P. J. Cosijn, and has lectured on J. R. R. Tolkien. His 2009 Introduction to Old Frisian, a book for the beginning student, according to E. G. Stanley, is "a book for the twenty-first century [...] a book of essentials, from which nothing essential has been omitted". In 2009, Bremmer published a kind of alphabet book with twenty-six terms from the Christian lexicon, Van Ambt tot Zonde ('From Office to Sin'), illustrated by Geert de Groot, which explains the Christian connotations of such concepts as sin and foreskin; the booklet collects articles originally published in the national daily Nederlands Dagblad.

Bremmer serves on the editorial board of the journals The Heroic Age, Neophilologus, and NOWELE, and on the advisory board of the journals Anglo-Saxon and Studies in Medievalism and of the series Dumbarton Oaks Medieval Library. In 2010, Bremmer delivered the Toller Lecture at the Manchester Centre for Anglo-Saxon Studies.

== Select bibliography ==
=== Books authored ===
- An Introduction to Old Frisian: History, Grammar, Reader, Glossary. Amsterdam/Philadelphia: John Benjamins, 2009.
- Van Ambt tot Zonde: Een greep uit onze christelijke woordenschat. Heerenveen: Protestantse Pers, 2009.
- Manuscripts in the Low Countries. Anglo-Saxon Manuscripts in Microfiche Facsimile 13 (with Kees Dekker). Tempe: Arizona Center for Medieval and Renaissance Studies, 2006
- 'Hir is eskriven'. Lezen en schrijven in de Friese landen rond 1330. Hilversum: Verloren / Ljouwert: Fryske Akademy, 2004.
- A Bibliographical Guide to old Frisian Studies. Odense: Odense UP, 1992.
- The Fyve Wyttes. A Late Middle English Devotional Treatise, Edited from BL MS Harley 2398 with an Introduction, Commentary and Glossary. Amsterdam and Atlanta: Rodopi, 1987.

=== Books edited ===
- Practice in Learning. The Transfer of Encyclopaedic Knowledge in the Early Middle Ages (with Kees Dekker). Paris, Leuven, and Dudley: Peeters, 2010.
- Advances in Old Frisian Philology (with Stephen Laker and Oebele Vries). Amsterdam and New York: Rodopi, 2007.
- Signs on the Edge. Space, Text and Margin in Medieval Manuscripts (with Sarah Larratt Keefer). Paris, Leuven, and Dudley: Peeters, 2007.
- Foundations of Learning. The Transfer of Encyclopaedic Knowledge in the Early Middle Ages (with Kees Dekker). Paris, Leuven, and Dudley: Peeters, 2007.
- Rome and the North: The Early Reception of Gregory the Great in Germanic Europe (with Kees Dekker and David F. Johnson). Paris, Leuven, and Sterling: Peeters, 2001.
- In skiednis fan de Fryske taalkunde (with Anne Dykstra). Ljouwert: Fryske Akademy, 1999.
- Franciscus Junius F.F. and His Circle. Amsterdam and Atlanta: Rodopi, 1998.
- Companion to Old English Poetry (with Henk Aertsen). Amsterdam: VU Press, 1994.
- Approaches to Old Frisian Philology (with Thomas S. B. Johnston and Oebele Vries). Amsterdam and Atlanta: Rodopi, 1998.
- Notes on Beowulf (trans. of P.J. Cosijn, Aantekeningen op den Beowulf, with Jan van den Berg and David F. Johnson). Leeds: School of English, University of Leeds, 1991.
- Aspects of Old Frisian Philology (with Geart van der Meer and Oebele Vries), Amsterdam and Atlanta: Rodopi, 1990.
