= Henk Aertsen =

Dutch linguist

Henk Aertsen (born 1943, Enkhuizen) is a now-retired professor of Old English and Middle English language and literature at the Vrije Universiteit, Amsterdam. He is the editor (with Alasdair MacDonald) of Companion to Middle English Romance (Amsterdam, VU Press, 1990), and (with Rolf Bremmer) of Companion to Old English Poetry (Amsterdam: VU Press, 1994).
