= P. J. Cosijn =

Pieter Jacob Cosijn
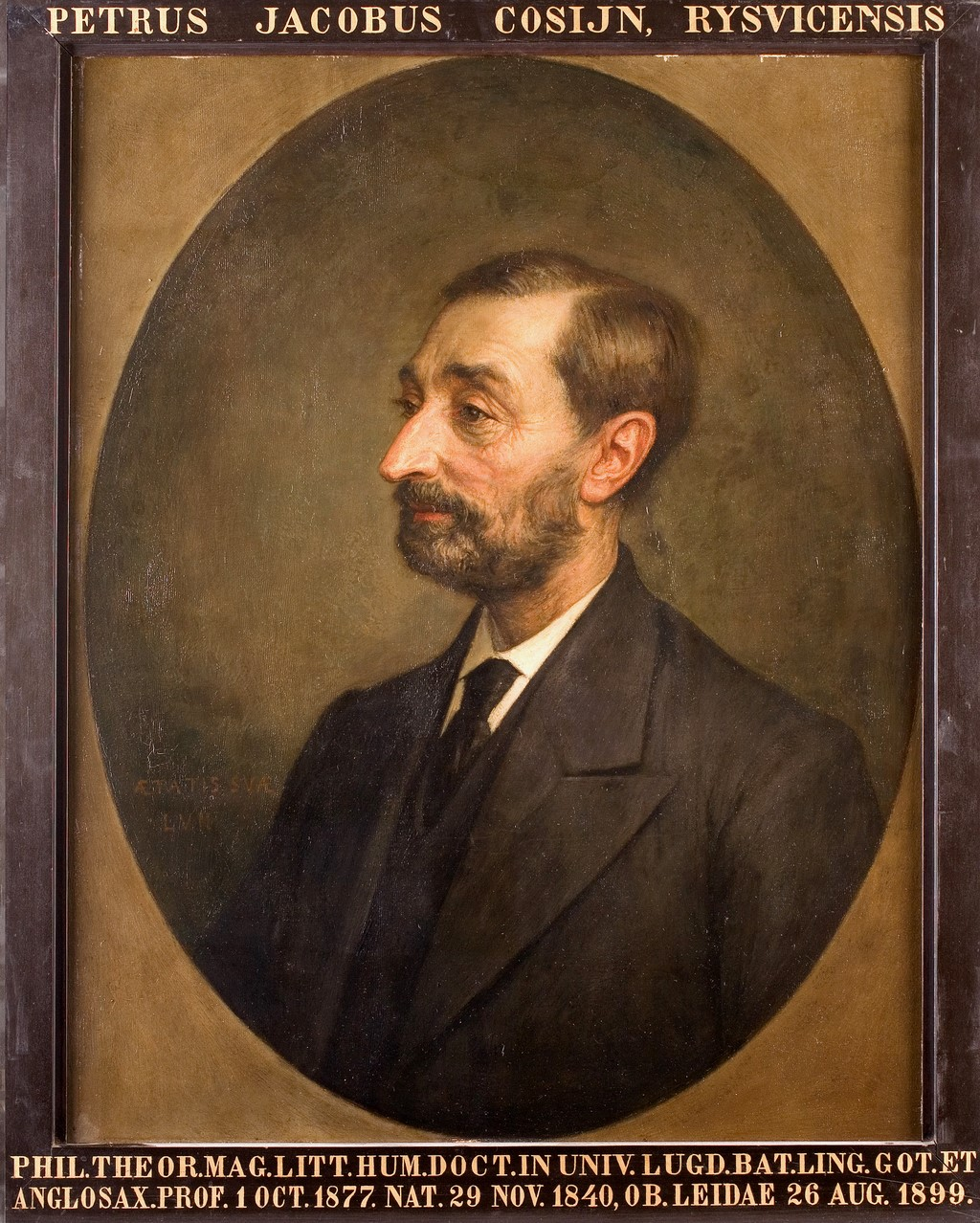
- Pieter Jacob Cosijn
- Born: 29 November 1840; Rijswijk, Netherlands
- Died: 26 August 1899 (aged 58); Leiden, Netherlands
- Education: Utrecht University
- Occupations: Linguist, medievalist, professor
- Organization: Leiden University
- Known for: Studies of Anglo-Saxon literature and Beowulf
- Title: Rector Magnificus of Leiden University (1898–1899)

Pieter Jacob (P. J.) Cosijn (29 November 1840, Rijswijk – 26 August 1899, Leiden) was a late 19th-century Dutch scholar of Anglo-Saxon literature. His important work on Beowulf was edited by Rolf Bremmer.

Cosijn became a member of the Royal Netherlands Academy of Arts and Sciences in 1877.
