= The Keys of Middle-earth =

Scholarly book on sources of Tolkien's fiction

- Cover of first edition
- Author: Stuart D. Lee; Elizabeth Solopova
- Language: English
- Subject: Tolkien's influences
- Genre: Medieval literature; literary criticism
- Published: 2005
- Publisher: Palgrave Macmillan
- Publication place: United Kingdom
- Media type: Print (paperback)
- Pages: 284
- ISBN: 978-1-137-45470-6

The Keys of Middle-earth: Discovering Medieval Literature Through the Fiction of J.R.R. Tolkien is a 2005 book by Stuart Lee and Elizabeth Solopova. It is meant to provide an understanding of J. R. R. Tolkien's Middle-earth fantasy writings in the context of medieval literature, including Old and Middle English and Old Norse, but excluding other relevant languages such as Finnish.

The book was broadly welcomed by scholars, who however felt it could have gone further to assist the student. They wrote that it was rather cautious of criticism from other academics; that the texts were rather too brief for much academic study; and that there were small but telling errors in the description of Tolkien's writings. The expanded second edition of 2015 added some new texts.

== Book ==
=== Publication history ===
The Keys of Middle-earth was published in a 284-page paperback in 2005 by Palgrave Macmillan. They published a second, expanded edition with 380 pages in 2015. (Note: Lee & Solopova 2015, Front matter)

=== Synopsis ===
The first part of the book serves as an introduction to the texts. It begins with a presentation of J. R. R. Tolkien, covering his career, the relationship of his Middle-earth fiction to medieval literature, and an overview of his medieval sources. A section then introduces medieval literature in Old English, Middle English and Old Norse. This part of the book concludes with five short essays on the thematic and technical parallels between Tolkien's writings and medieval literature, covering the theme of the quest and the epic, as well as runes, alliterative verse and Tolkien's uses of it, and the names that he chose. (Note: Lee & Solopova 2015, "Introduction", pp. 2–53)

A sample of Lee and Solopova's chapter for "The Battle of the Pelennor Fields"
The Battle of Maldon
lines 122–126
Facing-page translation

Swa stemnetton, stiðhicgende,
hysas æt hilde, hogodon georne
hwa þær mid orde ærost mihte
on fægean men feorh gewinnan,
wigan mid wæpnum; wæl feol on eorðan.

Thus they stood firm, resolute,
young men at battle; they, the warriors with weapons,
eagerly thought about whom they might first there
with the spear, win the life
from the doomed men. Slaughter fell to the ground.

At Pelennor, the refusal by Éowyn to abandon her lord, and the loyalty shown by Merry, reflect the actions of the warriors at Maldon. Merry's initial reaction is to "stay by him. As a father you shall be to me", and Éowyn warns the Witch-king: "You stand between me and my lord and kin".

Although they are not given any dialogue in the poem, one can imagine Wulfmær [and] Ælfnoth ... making similar challenges to the advancing Vikings. Éowyn and Merry are also mirroring the actions of the warriors towards the end of the poem who declare their willingness to die rather than abandon their lord. This is a common theme in Old English heroic verse.

The second part of the book is introduced with a brief chapter, "The Editions", on the approach taken and the selection of medieval texts paired with episodes from Tolkien's writings. The body of this part, named "The Texts", offers mainly short excerpts from fourteen medieval literary works in the languages mentioned. Each section consists of a plot summary of the relevant part of Tolkien's story; an introduction to the medieval text; a discussion of Tolkien's use of the text, citing scholars such as Tom Shippey; and finally a text. This is a facing-page (parallel) text and a new, rather literal, line-by-line translation if it is Old English or Old Norse, or no translation but plentiful notes for Middle English. (Note: Lee & Solopova 2015, "The Texts", pp. 57–265)

For The Hobbit, the texts are Völuspá (Gandalf and the Dwarves), Vafþrúðnismál and Solomon and Saturn II (the riddle-game), (Note: Lee & Solopova 2015, pp. 73–105) and Beowulf (Smaug the dragon). (Note: Lee & Solopova 2015, pp. 106–122) For The Lord of the Rings, the texts are Sir Orfeo (the Elves at Rivendell); (Note: Lee & Solopova 2015, pp. 123–132) The Ruin (Legolas's "Lament of the Stones"), (Note: Lee & Solopova 2015, pp. 133–145) The Fight at Finnsburg and Cynewulf and Cyneheard (The Bridge of Khazad-dum), (Note: Lee & Solopova 2015, pp. 146–163) Pearl (The Crossing of the Nimrodel), (Note: Lee & Solopova 2015, pp. 164–176) Beowulf (Boromir's Death), (Note: Lee & Solopova 2015, pp. 177–182) Maxims II (Treebeard's List), (Note: Lee & Solopova 2015, pp. 183–193) The Wanderer and Beowulf (The Rohirrim), (Note: Lee & Solopova 2015, pp. 194–216) The Battle of Maldon and Homily on the Maccabees (The Battle of the Pelennor Fields), (Note: Lee & Solopova 2015, pp. 217–234) Sir Gawain and the Green Knight and Beowulf (The Landscape of Mordor), (Note: Lee & Solopova 2015, pp. 235–249) and The Seafarer (The Gray Havens). (Note: Lee & Solopova 2015, pp. 250–265)

The second edition has a similar structure, with the addition of a section on Túrin Turambar and its texts, the Kalevala and the Cowbone whistle; Eärendil and its text, Crist 1; two Old English riddles to add to Bilbo and Gollum's riddle game; and Jordanes' Getica to add to the coverage of the Battle of the Pelennor Fields. (Note: Lee & Solopova 2015, Front matter)

== Reception ==
The book has been warmly received by scholars, though they find some issues with it. Kay Marsh, reviewing the book for Studies in the Novel, calls it "an attractive solution" to the "alterity" (otherness) of medieval literature, with a well-chosen selection of texts; she recommends it as "both useful and entertaining". In her view, the line-by-line translations make the texts accessible and invite the reader to read sections of untranslated (but copiously glossed) Middle English works like Sir Orfeo. Marsh praises the "well-researched" introduction which covers both Tolkien's career and the study of medieval languages; and notes the "five short essays" on parallels between Middle-earth and the medieval texts. Marsh suggests that there could have been more of a discussion of paleography, the process of creating medieval manuscripts, something that would be new to most of Lee and Solopova's readers.

Miranda Wilcox, in The Medieval Review, calls the book an excellent introduction, both for students to use as a text and as a resource for instructors. She writes that it offers a "judicious" selection of recent scholarship in the "compelling context" of the literary phenomenon that is Tolkien's Middle-earth. In her view, the book highlights Tolkien's scholarly "appreciation of both the technical and literary aspects of medieval texts". She finds the facing-page presentation of medieval texts and their translations valuable, illustrating some of the linguistic issues that so fascinated Tolkien.

John Holmes writes in Tolkien Studies that it has a relatively narrow scope (Old and Middle English, and Old Norse; no Silmarillion, which would have demanded the Finnish Kalevala at least) but provides real depth with "fresh, literal" translations and close examination of the similarities of the sources to Tolkien's writings. Holmes finds the book a "first rate" anthology of medieval texts, with "remarkably thorough" notes, but a somewhat nervous guide to Tolkien's works, wary of criticism from other academics. Arden R. Smith, writing in the same journal, comments that The Keys of Middle-earth is "essentially an anthology" that in Lee and Solopova's words "[draws] out parallels [with Tolkien's fiction] wherever possible", and states that it seems to be meant for an academic readership.

Michael Drout, in Notes and Queries, writes that while the book is a success in that it achieves most of its goals, it "could have been so much better", if it had avoided so much academic caution, such as quibbling about their title, and gone more boldly for providing a helpful introduction to Tolkien's medievalism for the student. In his view, the selection of texts is good, and they are presented and set in context fairly and non-tendentiously, but the fragments are too short for most academic purposes. Drout finds most valuable the quotations from the unpublished lecture notes that Tolkien used at Oxford; in his view, access to this material gave the editors the chance to "make a major contribution to the field which, unfortunately, they did not exploit to the fullest", not helped by listing unpublished manuscripts in "Further reading". He notes "minor but telling" errors, like Aragorn being "haunted" by the rhyme "All that is gold does not glitter" – in fact, he writes, it was composed for Aragorn by Bilbo; or again, the knights of Dol Amroth didn't arrive at the Battle of the Pelennor Fields with Aragorn, as they were already there defending the city of Minas Tirith.

The medieval historian and author Kari Sperring, writing in Strange Horizons, calls the selection of medieval texts "strong", and describes the presentation of the relationship between Tolkien's fiction and his research interests as clear and insightful. However, she feels that the book "falls between two stools", giving an "outsider view" of his writing, seen through the ancient texts, but that it lacks the more "personal insight" that Tolkien scholars might provide. Further, in her view, it "elides" other influences such as Tolkien's Catholicism and modern writers such as William Morris. All of this leaves her wondering what the book was for: it lacks the glossary and grammar needed for an undergraduate text in Old or Middle English, while the material is in her view rather technical for a lay audience.
