= The Two Towers =

1954 part of novel by J. R. R. Tolkien

- First edition, with Tolkien's artwork
- Author: J. R. R. Tolkien
- Language: English
- Series: The Lord of the Rings
- Genre: Fantasy
- Set in: Middle-earth
- Publisher: George Allen & Unwin
- Publication date: 11 November 1954
- Publication place: United Kingdom
- Pages: 352 (first edition)
- OCLC: 936070
- Dewey Decimal: 823.914
- LC Class: PR6039.O32 L6 1954, v.2
- Preceded by: The Fellowship of the Ring
- Followed by: The Return of the King

The Two Towers, first published in 1954, is the second volume of J. R. R. Tolkien's high fantasy novel The Lord of the Rings. It is preceded by The Fellowship of the Ring and followed by The Return of the King. The volume's title is ambiguous, as five towers are named in the narrative, and Tolkien himself gave conflicting identifications of the two towers. The narrative is interlaced, allowing Tolkien to build in suspense and surprise. The volume was largely welcomed by critics, who found it exciting and compelling, combining epic narrative with heroic romance. It formed the basis for the 2002 film The Lord of the Rings: The Two Towers, directed by Peter Jackson.

== Publication ==
The Lord of the Rings is composed of six "books", aside from an introduction, a prologue and six appendices. However, the novel was originally published as three separate volumes, to reduce the cost of publication. The Two Towers covers Books Three and Four.

== Contents ==
Some editions of the volume contain a Synopsis for readers who have not read the earlier volume. The body of the volume consists of Book Three: The Treason of Isengard, and Book Four: The Ring Goes East.

=== Book III: The Treason of Isengard ===
A party of large Orcs—Uruk-hai, sent by Saruman, and other Orcs sent by Sauron and led by Grishnákh—attack the Fellowship. Boromir tries to protect Merry and Pippin from the Orcs, but they kill him and capture the two hobbits. Aragorn, Gimli and Legolas decide to pursue the Orcs taking Merry and Pippin to Saruman. In the kingdom of Rohan, the Orcs are killed by Riders of Rohan, led by Éomer. Merry and Pippin escape into Fangorn Forest, where they are befriended by Treebeard, the oldest of the tree-like Ents. Aragorn, Gimli and Legolas track the hobbits to Fangorn. There they unexpectedly meet Gandalf, resurrected from the dead.

Gandalf explains that he killed the Balrog. He was also killed in the fight, but was sent back to Middle-earth to complete his mission. He is clothed in white and is now Gandalf the White, for he has taken Saruman's place as the chief of the wizards. Gandalf assures his friends that Merry and Pippin are safe. Together they ride to Edoras, capital of Rohan. Gandalf frees Théoden, King of Rohan, from the influence of Saruman's spy Gríma Wormtongue. Théoden musters his fighting strength and rides with his men to the ancient fortress of Helm's Deep, while Gandalf departs to seek help from Treebeard.

Meanwhile, the Ents, roused by Merry and Pippin from their peaceful ways, attack and destroy Isengard, Saruman's stronghold, and flood it, trapping the wizard in the tower of Orthanc. Gandalf convinces Treebeard to send an army of Huorns to Théoden's aid. He brings an army of Rohirrim to Helm's Deep, and they defeat the Orcs, who flee into the forest of Huorns, never to be seen again. Gandalf, Théoden, Aragorn, Legolas, and Gimli ride to Isengard, and are surprised to find Merry and Pippin relaxing amidst the ruins. Gandalf offers Saruman a chance to turn away from evil. When Saruman refuses to listen, Gandalf strips him of his rank and most of his powers. After Saruman leaves, Wormtongue throws down a hard round object to try to kill Gandalf. It misses and Pippin picks it up; Gandalf swiftly takes it, but Pippin steals it in the night. It is revealed to be a palantír, a seeing-stone that Saruman used to speak with Sauron, and that Sauron used to ensnare him. Pippin begins to be entranced by its power. While Gandalf sleeps, Pippin examines the palantír, inadvertently causing Sauron to see him; as Pippin is a hobbit, Sauron believes Pippin has the One Ring. Gandalf is awoken by the commotion and is able to save the incapacitated Pippin. Gandalf immediately rides for Minas Tirith, the chief city of Gondor, taking Pippin with him.

=== Book IV: The Ring Goes East ===
Frodo and Sam, heading for Mordor to destroy the One Ring, struggle through the barren hills and cliffs of the Emyn Muil. They become aware they are being watched and tracked; on a moonlit night they capture Gollum, who has followed them from Moria. Frodo makes Gollum swear to serve him, as Ringbearer, and asks him to guide them to Mordor. Gollum leads them across the Dead Marshes. Sam overhears Gollum debating with his alter ego, Sméagol, whether to break his promise and steal the Ring.

They find that the Black Gate of Mordor is too well guarded to pass through, so instead they travel south through the land of Ithilien to a secret pass that Gollum knows. On the way, they are captured by rangers led by Faramir, Boromir's younger brother, and brought to the secret fastness of Henneth Annûn. Unlike his brother, Faramir resists the temptation to seize the Ring and, disobeying standing orders to arrest strangers found in Ithilien, releases them.

Gollum – who is torn between his loyalty to Frodo and his desire for the Ring – guides the hobbits to the pass of Cirith Ungol, but leads them into the lair of the great spider Shelob in the tunnels there. Frodo holds up the gift given to him in Lothlórien: the Phial of Galadriel, which holds the light of Eärendil's star. The light drives Shelob away, and Frodo and Sam are able to get through the pass safely. However, after they leave the pass, Shelob appears and attacks Frodo; before he can help his master, Sam is attacked by Gollum. After fighting off Gollum, Sam picks up Frodo's sword, Sting; and the Phial. He seriously wounds and drives off Shelob, but after the fight, he finds Frodo unresponsive. Believing him to be dead, Sam takes the Ring to continue the quest alone. Before Sam gets far, however, Orcs find Frodo; Sam overhears them and learns that Frodo is still alive.

== Meaning of title ==
Tolkien initially considered choosing a pair from four towers. Three such pairs (Orthanc and Barad-dûr, Minas Tirith and Barad-dûr, or Orthanc and the Tower of Cirith Ungol, black lines) could have been the two used in the title. But he settled on a different pair (red line), with Orthanc and a fifth tower, Minas Morgul.

Tolkien's own design for the volume's cover shows the two towers as Minas Morgul, white with the symbol of the rising moon, and Orthanc, black with Saruman's symbol of the white hand nearby.

In a letter to Rayner Unwin in August 1953, Tolkien proposed the volume's title and considered leaving it vague, naming the ambiguous two as Orthanc and Barad-dûr, or Minas Tirith and Barad-dûr, or Orthanc and the Tower of Cirith Ungol. In another letter, in January 1954, he stated that he was "not at all happy about the title The Two Towers", writing that if the title had "any real reference in it to Vol II" it would have to "refer to Orthanc and the Tower of Cirith Ungol" (his italics). He at once added that this would however be "very misleading", since there was "so much made of the basic opposition of the Dark Tower and Minas Tirith". However, a month later, he wrote a note that is included at the end of The Fellowship of the Ring, and later drew a cover illustration, both of which identified the pair as Minas Morgul and Orthanc. In the illustration, Minas Morgul is a white tower, with a thin waning moon above it, in reference to its original name, Minas Ithil, the Tower of the Rising Moon. Orthanc is shown as a black tower, three-horned, with Saruman's sign of the White Hand beside it. A Nazgûl flies between the two towers.

Towers considered by Tolkien as candidates for the two mentioned in the volume's title
Tower	Status	Owner or inhabitant	Notes
Orthanc	Chosen	The Wizard Saruman	Saruman was leader of the White Council, but fell in the desire to get the One Ring for himself, and is now an adversary, though less powerful than Sauron.
Barad-dûr	Considered	Sauron	Sauron is the Dark Lord or "Lord of the Rings", the chief adversary; he made the One Ring and seeks to get it back to dominate Middle-earth from his realm of Mordor.
Cirith Ungol	Considered	Orcs of Mordor	Frodo is held captive by the Orcs of the tower; he is freed by Sam Gamgee
Minas Tirith	Considered	Kingdom of Gondor	The Kingdom has not had a King for many centuries, but remains free, the principal realm opposed to Mordor. The tower's name means "Tower of Guard".
Minas Morgul	Chosen	The nine Nazgûl	The tower, as Minas Ithil, Tower of the Rising Moon, was once part of Gondor; it guarded Gondor from the threat of Mordor, but has now been occupied by the nine Ringwraiths, powerful servants of the Dark Lord, and renamed to Minas Morgul, the Tower of Sorcery. Their leader is the Witch-King of Angmar, like the others enslaved by a Ring of Power given by Sauron.

== Interwoven narratives ==
The narrative in the volume is interlaced, unlike the largely linear narrative in The Fellowship of the Ring, as the Fellowship is broken and the different groups pursue their own quests. The main quest, to destroy the One Ring, does not progress at all in book 3; conversely, the other quests do not make progress in book 4 as Frodo and Sam continue their dangerous journey towards Mordor. The timeline is more complex than this would suggest, as many smaller-scale interlacings occur as the characters travel through Middle-earth.

Interlacing allowed Tolkien to weave an elaborately intricate story, presented through the eyes of the Hobbit protagonists, "underscoring [their] frequent bewilderment and disorientation". Most directly, this is achieved by letting the reader know only what one character sees as he struggles forwards, not knowing what lies ahead, where his friends are, or whether the quest has already failed. The bewilderment of the reader is minimized by the use of synchronizing 'narrative landmarks', such as the brooch dropped by Pippin and discovered by Aragorn. Equally, interlacing enables Tolkien to create suspense and "cliffhanger" section endings, as when the Ents and Huorns appear suddenly and decisively in the eucatastrophe on the battlefield of Helm's Deep.

The Tolkien scholar Richard C. West writes that every reader must notice to some degree "the apparently meandering manner of the plot", where things happen apparently casually, as if by chance, as in real life. West illustrates this by examining Merry and Pippin's meeting with the Ents. This causes the Ents to overthrow their enemy Saruman, who was also the enemy of the kingdom of Rohan. This frees up Rohan to go to the aid of Gondor in their war with Sauron. The two Hobbits would never have met the Ents unless Saruman's Orcs had captured them. The Hobbits would not have escaped the Orcs unless Éomer's band of Riders of Rohan, disobeying orders from the King, had hunted the Orc intruders down. West states that each group and character has their own motivation, but their stories interact. It feels natural, and may appear "loose", but "everything is interconnected." The interlacing allows Tolkien to make hidden connections that can only be grasped retrospectively, as the reader realizes on reflection that certain events happened at the same time. Interlace, West notes, can "show purpose or pattern behind change". This can appear, Shippey writes, as luck, where in daily life it is uncertain whether this is "something completely humdrum and practical or something mysterious and supernatural".

== Reception ==
Donald Barr in The New York Times gave the book a positive review, calling it "an extraordinary work – pure excitement, unencumbered narrative, moral warmth, barefaced rejoicing in beauty, but excitement most of all".

Anthony Boucher, reviewing the volume in The Magazine of Fantasy & Science Fiction, wrote that The Two Towers "makes inordinate demands upon the patience of its readers" with passages which "could be lopped away without affecting form or content". Nevertheless, he lavished praise on the volume, saying "no writer save E. R. Eddison has ever so satisfactorily and compellingly created his own mythology and made it come vividly alive ... described in some of the most sheerly beautiful prose that this harsh decade has seen in print."

The Times Literary Supplement called it a "prose epic in praise of courage" and stated that Tolkien's Westernesse "comes to rank in the reader's imagination with Asgard and Camelot".

John Jordan, admiring the book's narrative in the Irish Press, wrote of its "weaving of epic, heroic romance, parable, and fairy tale, and the more adventurous kind of detective story, into a pattern at once strange and curiously familiar to our experience". He compared the wizard Gandalf's death and reappearance to Christ's resurrection, writing that this could be done "without irreverence" because of Tolkien's seriousness about good and evil.

Mahmud Manzalaoui, in the Egyptian Gazette, wrote that the book "has not pleased readers of the staple modern psychological novel", but that it signified a new trend in fiction.

In The Observer, the Scottish poet Edwin Muir, who had praised The Fellowship of the Ring, called Tolkien's invention of the Ents and his account of the Battle of Helm's Deep magnificent. He wrote that contrary to some people's assumption, one could not equate the Ring to the atomic bomb; rather, it directly represented evil.

== Adaptations ==
Peter Jackson's 2002 film The Lord of the Rings: The Two Towers is based on The Two Towers. It adds some new material, such as the scene where Aragorn falls over a cliff; it imports some material from the preceding volume, The Fellowship of the Ring, such as the Wargs' attack on refugees from Edoras; and it leaves some material to be covered in the following film, such as the scene with the giant spider Shelob. The film was acclaimed by critics and was highly successful at the box office.

== Sources ==
- Carpenter, Humphrey, ed. (2023) [1981]. The Letters of J. R. R. Tolkien: Revised and Expanded Edition. New York: HarperCollins. ISBN 978-0-35-865298-4.
- Holmes, John R. (2014). "The Lord of the Rings". In Lee, Stuart D. (ed.). A Companion to J. R. R. Tolkien. Wiley-Blackwell. pp. 133–145. ISBN 978-0-4706-5982-3.
- Noel, Ruth S. (1974). The Languages of Tolkien's Middle-earth. Houghton Mifflin. p. 170. ISBN 0-395-29129-1.
- Shippey, Tom (2005) [1982]. The Road to Middle-Earth: How J. R. R. Tolkien Created a New Mythology (Third ed.). HarperCollins. ISBN 978-0-261-10275-0.
- Sturgis, Amy H. (2013) [2007]. "Lord of the Rings, The". In Drout, Michael D. C. (ed.). J.R.R. Tolkien Encyclopedia. Routledge. p. 389. ISBN 978-0-415-86511-1.
- Tolkien, J. R. R. (1954a). The Fellowship of the Ring. The Lord of the Rings. Boston: Houghton Mifflin. OCLC 9552942.
- Tolkien, J. R. R. (1954). The Two Towers. The Lord of the Rings. Boston: Houghton Mifflin. OCLC 1042159111.
- West, Richard C. (1975). "The Interlace Structure of The Lord of the Rings". In Jared Lobdell (ed.). A Tolkien Compass. Open Court. pp. 77–94. ISBN 978-0-87548-303-0.
