= Stuart D. Lee =

Tolkien scholar and information technology specialist

Stuart Dermot Lee (born 3 February 1966) is a Professor of English Literature at Oxford University and a specialist in Old English, J. R. R. Tolkien, Fantasy Literature, War Poetry, and digital humanities. He is also a Reader in E-learning at Oxford University, and is best known for his scholarly books on J. R. R. Tolkien. He has written several plays, two of which won Oxford Playhouse new writing awards.

== Biography ==
Lee was born in Dublin, Ireland. He was educated at Bancroft's School, Essex. He read English and Economics at the University of Keele. He gained an M.A. in English literature at King's College London, and gained his PhD in Old English literature there in 1992, with a thesis on "Judith, Esther, and the Maccabees". He then obtained a postgraduate certificate in Education.

Lee briefly lectured at Royal Holloway and Bedford New College before moving to the University of Oxford, where he worked on the use of information technology for teaching. In 1996 he became Head of the Centre for Humanities Computing there. In 2001 he became head of the university's Learning Technologies Group, in 2005 director of computing systems and services for Oxford University Computing Services, and in 2012 Deputy CIO, and in 2024 as Interim CIO.

He was made a Professor of English in 2024 having taught and researched for many years on Old English, Tolkien, and the poetry of the First World War. He led numerous crowd-sourcing and digitization projects around WW1 and WW2 all collected together at war.web.ox.ac.uk. He is also the University's Reader in Digital Libraries and eLearning.

In 2004 he completed his first play The Ghosts May Laugh, set in the trenches of the First World War. This was produced in Oxford and Edinburgh. His other plays include The Attic, Dev's Army, Quiz Night at the Britannia, The Intricate Workings of a Sherbet Lemon, An Academic's Progress, and Leaf-mould.

== Reception ==
=== A Companion to J. R. R. Tolkien ===
Jorge Luis Bueno-Alonso, reviewing A Companion to J. R. R. Tolkien for Tolkien Studies, described Lee as "one of the outstanding names of recent Tolkien critical scholarship and co-author of one of the most imaginative books on the relationships between Tolkien’s fiction and medieval English literature (Lee & Solopova [2005])". Of the book, he wrote that it brought order to the morass of publications on Tolkien, and noted that it finally brought Tolkien into the canon of Anglo-American studies as it was one of the "prestigious" Blackwell Companion series. He described the challenge of making a brief 25-page overview of Tolkien's life, undertaken by John Garth in the volume, "an enta geweorc", ("a work of giants").

Andrew Higgins, reviewing the book for the Journal of Tolkien Research, welcomed the "eminent line-up" of authors (naming Tom Shippey, Verlyn Flieger, Dimitra Fimi, John D. Rateliff and Gergely Nagy) of the work's 36 articles, and called it "joyous indeed that after many years of polite (and not so polite) disdain and dismissal by establishment “academics” and the “cultural intelligentsia”" that Tolkien had reached the "academic pantheon" of Blackwell Companions. Higgins applauded Lee for "the overall thematic structuring of this volume, which offers a progressive profile of Tolkien the man, the student and scholar, and the mythopoeist. I found Lee’s ordering of these papers most helpful".

== Awards and distinctions ==
- 2007 Winner of Oxford Playhouse new writing competition for The Attic
- 2007 Winner of Oxford Playhouse new writing competition for Never Tell Them
- 2008 Teaching award, Oxford University
- 2009 Higher Education Authority National Teaching Fellow
- 2024 Professor of English Literature, University of Oxford

== Books ==
=== Literary ===
- 2005 The Keys of Middle-earth (with Elizabeth Solopova), Palgrave Macmillan. 2nd edition 2015.
- 2006 Key Concepts in Medieval Literature (with Elizabeth Solopova), Macmillan.
- 2013 A Companion to J. R. R. Tolkien (edited), Wiley-Blackwell. 2nd edition 2022.
- 2017 J. R. R. Tolkien (edited), Routledge.

=== Information technology ===
- 2000 Digital Imaging: A Practical Handbook, Facet.
- 2001 Building an Electronic Resource Collection: A Practical Guide (with Frances Boyle), Facet.
