= Elizabeth Solopova =

British academic (born 1965)

Elizabeth Solopova (born 20 January 1965) is a Russian-British philologist and medievalist undertaking research at New College, Oxford. She is known outside academic circles for her work on J. R. R. Tolkien's Middle-earth writings.

== Life ==
Elizabeth Solopova was born in the Soviet Union and graduated from Moscow State University. She completed her PhD in English at the University of Oxford. She is a research fellow at the University of Oxford, where she teaches Old and Middle English.

== Reception ==
=== The Keys of Middle-Earth ===
Solopova's 2005 book The Keys of Middle-Earth, written with Stuart D. Lee, on Tolkien's medieval sources for his fantasy writings, was warmly received by scholars, though they found some issues with it. It is her most-cited work. It has been described as an excellent introduction, both for students to use as a text and as a resource for instructors, and an interesting sidelight on the linguistic issues that so fascinated Tolkien. Scholars have praised it as a well-chosen selection of texts and a well-researched introduction to both Tolkien's career and the study of medieval languages. Others have noted that it excludes The Silmarillion, which would have demanded the Finnish Kalevala. As a student text, its medieval fragments are well-introduced but too short for most academic purposes.

=== Key Concepts in Medieval Literature ===
Solopova's 2007 book Key Concepts in Medieval Literature, also written with Stuart D. Lee, has been praised as a scholarly introduction with essays at a level suitable for undergraduates and helpful recommendations for further reading. The literature is however exclusively English.

== Books ==
She has written or edited the following books:

- 2000 Chaucer: The General Prologue
- 2005 The Keys of Middle-Earth: Discovering Medieval Literature through the Fiction of J. R. R. Tolkien
- 2009 Languages, Myths and History: An Introduction to the Linguistic and Literary Background of J. R. R. Tolkien's Fiction
- 2007 Key Concepts in Medieval Literature
- 2015 Latin Liturgical Psalters in the Bodleian Library: A Select Catalogue – a catalogue of 111 liturgical psalters from the Bodleian Library, with details of bookbinding, decoration, and text.
- 2016 The Wycliffite Bible: Origin, History and Interpretation
- 2020 From the Vulgate to the Vernacular: Four Debates on an English Question c. 1450 (editor, with J. Catto and A. Hudson)
