= Joseph Bosworth (scholar) =

English scholar of Anglo-Saxon (1788–1876)

Joseph Bosworth FRS (1788 – 27 May 1876) was an English scholar of the Anglo-Saxon language and compiler of the first major Anglo-Saxon dictionary.

== Biography ==
Born in Derbyshire in 1788, Bosworth was educated at Repton School as a 'Poor Scholar' but left in his early teens and did not go to university. Despite the lack of a degree he somehow gained sufficient academic standing for the Church of England to allow him to become a priest. He became a curate in Bunny, Notts in 1814 and three years later became vicar of Little Horwood, Buckinghamshire. He was proficient in many European languages and made a particular study of Anglo-Saxon. This suggests that his years between leaving Repton and becoming a priest were spent working for someone whose own interests lay in these directions and who greatly encouraged Bosworth's academic development. There is no proof as to who this was but possible candidates are Sharon Turner (1768-1847), a London solicitor turned researcher or Alexander Crombie (1762-1840), a Scottish-born philologist and proprietor of a school in London.

Bosworth was awarded an M.A. in 1822 by the University of Aberdeen on the recommendation of three other Buckinghamshire clergymen. In 1823, his Elements of Anglo-Saxon Grammar appeared, and he also matriculated at Trinity College, Cambridge as a 'ten-year man' (mature student). In July 1825 he was elected a member of the American Antiquarian Society, and in June 1829, he was elected a Fellow of the Royal Society.

In 1829, Bosworth went to the Netherlands as a chaplain, first in Amsterdam and then in Rotterdam. In 1831, the degree of Ph.D. was conferred on him by the University of Leyden. Trinity College, Cambridge granted him the degree of B.D. in 1834 and D.D. in 1839. He remained in the Netherlands until 1840, working on his A Dictionary of the Anglo-Saxon Language (1838), his best-known work. Thomas Northcote Toller later compiled a new edition of the dictionary based on Bosworth's work, both printed and in manuscript, and added a supplement (2 vols. 1898–1921). The University of Aberdeen granted him an LL.D. in 1838 on the recommendation of Alexander Crombie (see above) and Thomas Orger.

In 1858 Bosworth became Rector of Water Stratford, Buckinghamshire, and Rawlinsonian Professor of Anglo-Saxon at Oxford. He gave £10,000 to the University of Cambridge in 1867 for the establishment of the professorship of Anglo-Saxon. He died on 27 May 1876 leaving behind him a mass of annotations on the Anglo-Saxon charters and was buried on 2 June 1876 in Water Stratford churchyard. Income from his estate was left to various relatives for their lifetimes but as they died it was added to the endowment of his Oxford professorship.

== Legacy ==
Bosworth was succeeded by John Earle (1824–1903) and Arthur Sampson Napier (1853–1916). In 1916, the chair was renamed to Rawlinson and Bosworth Professor of Anglo-Saxon in honour of Bosworth and his endowment, the first "Rawlinson and Bosworth" professor being Sir William Alexander Craigie (1867–1957), who in 1925 moved to a post at the University of Chicago (in order to work on his Dictionary of American English) and was succeeded by J. R. R. Tolkien who held the post from 1925 to 1945.
