= Toller Lecture =

University of Manchester annual lecture

The Toller Lecture is an annual lecture at the University of Manchester's Manchester Centre for Anglo-Saxon Studies (MANCASS). It is named after Thomas Northcote Toller, one of the editors of An Anglo-Saxon Dictionary.

Notable lecturers have included Janet Bateley, the first Toller lecturer, Rolf Bremmer, George Brown, Michelle P. Brown, Roberta Frank, Helmut Gneuss, Nicholas Howe, Joyce Hill, Simon Keynes, Clare Lees, Katherine O'Brien O'Keeffe, Paul Szarmach, Elaine Treharne, Leslie Webster and Barbara Yorke. In the past, most Toller lectures were published in the Bulletin of the John Rylands University Library of Manchester; while a collection containing the revised and updated lectures from 1987 to 1997, together with new essays on Toller and the Toller Collection in the John Rylands Library, was published in 2003. However, with the establishment of the John Rylands Research Institute, the decision was made to prioritise the Special Collections of the Library in a revamped Bulletin of the John Rylands Library, and Toller lectures were no longer published there. It was therefore decided to publish recent Toller lectures as a separate collection which appeared in 2017.

== Bibliography ==
- Scragg, Donald, ed. (2003). Textual and Material Culture in Anglo-Saxon England: Thomas Northcote Toller and the Toller Memorial Lectures. Publications of the Manchester Centre for Anglo-Saxon Studies. Vol. 1. Cambridge: D.S. Brewer. ISBN 978-0-85991-773-5. Contains the first eleven Toller lectures.
- Insley, Charles; Owen-Crocker, Gale, eds. (2017). Transformation in Anglo-Saxon Culture: Toller Lectures on Art, Archaeology and Text. Oxford and Philadelphia: Oxbow Books. ISBN 9781785704970.
