= Robert Meadows White =

English cleric and academic

- Born: 8 January 1798
- Died: 31 January 1865 (aged 67)
- Education: Magdalen College, Oxford
- Occupation(s): English cleric and academic
- Parent: Robert Gostling White & Elizabeth Meadows

Robert Meadows White (1798–1865) was an English cleric and academic, holding the office of Rawlinson and Bosworth Professor of Anglo-Saxon at Oxford University from 1834.

== Life ==
Born on 8 January 1798, he was the eldest son of Robert Gostling White (died 18 October 1828), a solicitor at Halesworth in Suffolk, by his second wife, Elizabeth Meadows (died 25 September 1831); the solicitor John Meadows White was his younger brother. In 1813 Robert was sent to school under John Valpy at Norwich, where John Lindley the botanist, and "Rajah" James Brooke, were his fellow pupils. On 26 July 1815 he matriculated at Magdalen College, Oxford, and in the same year was elected a demy, graduating B.A. on 14 December 1819, M.A. on 28 February 1822, B.D. on 21 November 1833, and D.D. on 23 November 1843. He was ordained deacon in 1821 and priest in 1822. In 1824 he was elected a fellow of Magdalen College, retaining his fellowship till 1847. From 1832 till 1840 he acted as a college tutor. On 15 March 1831 he became proctor, and on 23 April 1834 he was chosen Rawlinson professor of Anglo-Saxon, holding that post for the statutable period of five years.

In 1839, at the end of his term of office, White was presented to the vicarage of Woolley, West Yorkshire, near Wakefield, by Godfrey Wentworth of that parish, to whose son William he had acted as tutor. After Wentworth's death he left Woolley, and went to Charles Anderson-Pelham, 2nd Earl of Yarborough at Brocklesby Hall in Lincolnshire, where he acted as tutor to the baron's grandsons. In 1842 he was presented to the rectory of Little and Great Glemham in Suffolk by the Hon. Mrs. North, Lord Yarborough's sister, and on 29 October 1846 he was presented by Magdalen College to the rectory of Slimbridge in Gloucestershire, which he retained until his death.

White died unmarried at Cheltenham on 31 January 1865, and was buried at Slimbridge, in the churchyard, near the chancel south wall.

== Works ==
White had contemplated the publication of a Saxon and English vocabulary, and only abandoned the project because it appeared likely to clash with the Anglo-Saxon Dictionary then being prepared by Joseph Bosworth. About 1832 he started editing the Ormulum, a harmonised gospel narrative in verse, preserved in a unique manuscript in the Bodleian Library. The task took nearly twenty years. White visited Denmark in 1837, and travelled to Moscow, where he was arrested and suffered a short detention for visiting the Kremlin without an official order. His edition of the Ormulum was issued in 1852 from the university press, and in the following year an elaborate criticism of it was published in English by C. H. Monicke, a German professor.
