= Arthur Napier =

British philologist (1853–1916)

Arthur Napier FBA
- Born: Arthur Sampson Napier; 30 August 1853; Wilmslow, England
- Died: 10 May 1916 (aged 62)
- Spouse: Mary (m. 1879)

Academic background
- Education: Owens College; Exeter College, Oxford; University of Göttingen
- Doctoral advisor: Julius Zupitza

Academic work
- Discipline: Philology
- Institutions: Merton College, Oxford
- Notable students: Roger Sherman Loomis; Kenneth Sisam

Arthur Sampson Napier FBA (1853–1916) was a British philologist. He was Merton Professor of English Language and Literature, University of Oxford, from 1885 and also Rawlinsonian Professor of Anglo-Saxon since 1903. Napier was appointed a fellow of Merton College, Oxford, in 1885 and of the British Academy in 1904.

Born in Wilmslow on 30 August 1853, Napier studied at Owens College, Exeter College, Oxford, and the University of Göttingen.

Napier was also an avid collector of the Oxford college stamp issues and gave talks and displays on this subject. He also wrote many articles for Gibbons Stamp Monthly on the college stamp issues. He was Vice President of the Oxford Philatelic Society from 1892 onwards.

Napier died on 10 May 1916.

Academic offices
New office	Merton Professor of English; Language and Literature; 1885–1916	Vacant Title next held by H. C. K. Wyld
Preceded by John Earle	Rawlinsonian Professor of Anglo-Saxon; 1903–1916	Succeeded by William Craigie as Rawlinson and Bosworth; Professor of Anglo-Saxon
