= Kenneth Sisam =

Academic publisher

Kenneth Sisam (2 September 1887 – 26 August 1971) was a New Zealand academic and publisher, whose major career was as an employee of the Oxford University Press.

== Life ==
Born at Ōpōtiki in 1887, Sisam was the eighth and youngest child of Alfred John Sisam, a police officer and farmer, and his wife Maria Knights. He was educated at Auckland Grammar School, and entered University College, Auckland, in 1906 with a scholarship, where he graduated MA in 1910.

With a Rhodes scholarship, Sisam matriculated at Merton College, Oxford, in 1910. He completed a B.Litt. there under Arthur Napier in 1915, producing an edition of the Salisbury Psalter. He married that year. In this period he taught students including J. R. R. Tolkien. Poor health ruled out military service, and he went to work part-time on the Oxford English Dictionary. In 1916, he published on the Beowulf manuscript.

In 1917, the Sisams moved to London, where Kenneth worked as a civil servant. In 1922, he joined Oxford University Press (OUP). With his promotion to assistant secretary, they built a family house at Boars Hill. From 1922 to 1942 Sisam worked at OUP under Robert William Chapman while developing his scholarly work on Anglo-Saxon, but failing in 1925 to become Rawlinson and Bosworth Professor of Anglo-Saxon (when Tolkien was chosen). OUP successes under his stewardship include introducing 30 new titles to the Oxford World's Classics series; the creation of the Oxford Companion to English and the Oxford Latin Dictionary; and the recruitment of W. B. Yeats as editor of The Oxford Book of Modern Verse.

Sisam was elected to the British Academy in 1941. Appointed OUP secretary in succession to Chapman in 1942, he became a Fellow of Merton College. In 1948, he retired to the Scilly Isles but continued to produce scholarship, including an influential article on 'Anglo-Saxon Royal Genealogies' and The Structure of Beowulf (1965). He died in a nursing home at Lelant in Cornwall on 26 August 1971.

== Family ==
In 1915, Sisam married Naomi Irene Gibbons (1886–1958), daughter of Robert Pearce Gibbons, from Auckland. They had a son, Hugh (1923–89) and a daughter, Celia (1926–2025), who became a scholar of Anglo-Saxon.
