= William Edward Buckley =

William Edward Buckley (9 October 1817 – 18 March 1892) was a Church of England clergyman, an academic who taught both classical languages and Old English, and also a journalist. He was Rawlinsonian Professor of Anglo-Saxon at the University of Oxford from 1844 to 1849.

== Early life ==
Buckley was the fourth son of Joseph Buckley (died 1858), of the Crescent, Salford, and later of Ordsall Hill, by his marriage to Jean, a daughter of Frazer Smith of Stromness, Orkney, and was the grandson of John Buckley. He was one of eight children, who all survived to adulthood and were still living in 1874. In 1817 Joseph Buckley was boroughreeve, and in 1825 he moved his family to Devon. Another of his sons, Joseph Buckley, also went into the church and became Rector of Sopworth, Wiltshire.

Buckley was educated at Tiverton Grammar School, Exeter School, and Brasenose College, Oxford, where he was admitted on 10 June 1835. In 1839 he graduated BA and in the Michaelmas term of the same year was President of the Oxford Union. In 1842 his degree was promoted to MA.

== Career ==
In 1842 Buckley became a Fellow of Brasenose College and from 1844 to 1849 was also Rawlinsonian Professor of Anglo-Saxon, succeeding Henry Bristow Wilson. In 1853 he was appointed as Rector of Middleton Cheney and became a rural dean. He was also Professor of Classics at the East India Company College until it was closed by the East India Company in January 1858. For some years he was on the staff of The Times newspaper and was also a contributor to Notes and Queries. He edited some of the publications of the Roxburghe Club and in 1884 was elected as its vice-president.

He died at Middleton Cheney on 18 March 1892, leaving a library of some 25,000 books. One obituary said of him "A man of many friends, he was an excellent talker, full of geniality and good stories". His books were sold in two sales at Sotheby's, in February 1893 and April 1894, for a total of £9,420.

== Selected publications ==
- The Old English Version of Partonope of Blois (Roxburghe Club, 1862)
- Cephalus and Procris: Narcissus (London: Nichols & Sons, 1882)
- The Kings Prophecie: or, Weeping joy. Expressed in a poem, to the honor of Englands too great solemnities (London: Nichols & Sons, 1882)
- The Brasenose Calendar: A List of Members of the King's Hall and College of Brasenose in Oxford (1509-1888) (University Press, Oxford, 1888)
