= George Brown (medievalist) =

American scholar of medieval studies

George Hardin Brown was an American scholar of medieval studies. The focus of his scholarship includes Anglo-Latin and Anglo-Saxon literature, especially the work of the Venerable Bede. Brown had a long academic career at many renowned institutions and has studied under other notable scholars in his field. He died on November 6, 2021.

== Education ==
Brown received his B.A. (1955), Ph.L. (1956), and M.A. (1959) degrees from Saint Louis University. He also studied theology in Austria before returning to the United States. Brown earned his Ph.D. from Harvard University in 1971, from a department that included scholars of medieval and oral literature such as Francis Peabody Magoun, Albert Lord, and Walter Ong.

== Professional career ==
After receiving his Ph.D., Brown took a position at Stanford University, where he worked until his death and where he headed the Medieval Studies Program in the Stanford University School of Humanities and Sciences. In 1994 he gave the Toller Lecture, which is considered a foundational work in early English textual studies. In 1996, at the Bede Foundation in Jarrow, he gave the Jarrow Lecture. Before his death he was editing a new edition of Bede's historical works (Opera historica minora), to be published by Brepols for the Corpus Christianorum Series Latina.

== Select bibliography ==
=== Books authored ===
- Brown, George Hardin (2009). A Companion to the Venerable Bede. Boston: Boydell & Brewer. ISBN 978-1-84383-476-2. Archived from the original on April 19, 2013.
- Brown, George Hardin (1996). Bede the educator. Jarrow: St. Paul's Church.
- Brown, George Hardin (c. 1987). Bede, the Venerable. Boston: Twayne. ISBN 0-8057-6940-4.

=== Books edited ===
- Greenfield, Stanley B. (1989). George Hardin Brown (ed.). Hero and exile: the art of Old English poetry. London; Ronceverte: Hambledon Press. ISBN 0-907628-91-5.
- Karkov, Catherine E.; George Hardin Brown (2003). Anglo-Saxon styles. Albany: State University of New York Press. ISBN 0-7914-5869-5.

=== In honor of George Hardin Brown ===
- Jolly, Karen Louise; Catherine E. Karkov; Sarah Larratt Keefer (2008). Cross and culture in Anglo-Saxon England: studies in honor of George Hardin Brown. Morgantown: West Virginia UP. ISBN 978-1-933202-23-5.
