= Thomas Northcote Toller =

British academic and lexicographer (1844–1930)

Professor Thomas Northcote Toller
- Born: 1844; Kettering, England
- Died: 1930 (aged 85–86)

Academic work
- Discipline: Old English
- Institutions: University of Manchester

Thomas Northcote Toller (1844–1930) was the first professor of English language at Manchester and one of the editors of An Anglo-Saxon Dictionary which had been begun by Joseph Bosworth. He was appointed to the chair in 1880 and retired in 1903. The annual Toller Lecture, which commemorates his achievements, is held in Manchester.

== Biography ==
Toller was born in Kettering, to Caroline (née Wallis) and Joseph Toller.

In 1880 he was appointed as Chair of English Language at the University of Manchester, and he retired in 1903.
