= Water Stratford =

Village in Buckinghamshire, England

Coordinates: 52.007°N 1.050°W

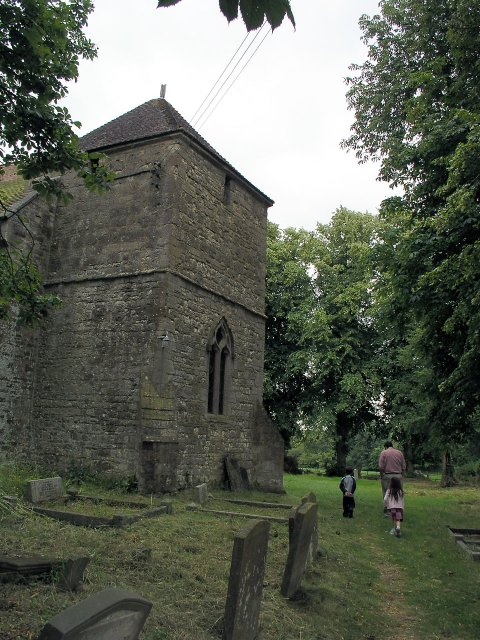
- Tower of St Giles' parish church

- Location within Buckinghamshire
- Population: 112 (2011 Census)
- OS grid reference: SP6534
- Civil parish: Water Stratford
- Unitary authority: Buckinghamshire
- Ceremonial county: Buckinghamshire
- Region: South East
- Country: England
- Sovereign state: United Kingdom
- Post town: Buckingham
- Postcode district: MK18
- Dialling code: 01280
- Police: Thames Valley
- Fire: Buckinghamshire
- Ambulance: South Central
- UK Parliament: Buckingham and Bletchley

Water Stratford is a village and civil parish on the River Great Ouse in Buckinghamshire, England. It is about 3 miles (5 km) west of Buckingham, near the boundary with Oxfordshire.

== Manor ==
The toponym "Stratford" is common in England, being derived from the Old English for "ford by a Roman road". The Roman road is still traceable through the village. The prefix "Water" was added to differentiate the village from other places called Stratford. The name has evolved through the centuries from Stradford in the Domesday Book of 1086, through Stratforwe, Straford and Westratforde in the 13th to 15th centuries.

The earliest known record of Water Stratford is from the time of Edward the Confessor (reigned 1042–66). After the Norman conquest of England Water Stratford was one of many manors in the region that William of Normandy granted to Robert D'Oyly, who built Oxford Castle. The Domesday Book of 1086 assessed Water Stratford's cultivated land at eight hides. Water Stratford remained in the D'Oyly family until the 13th century, when it passed from Henry D'Oyly to his nephew Thomas de Beaumont, 6th Earl of Warwick. The Earl died heirless, leaving his sister Margaret, by whose marriage Water Stratford then passed to the du Plessis family. Late in the 13th century Hugh du Plessis seems to have granted Water Stratford to Edward I in an exchange of lands. The manor was then the property of successive Princes of Wales until the English Civil War in the middle of the 17th century. No record of the feudal overlordship is known from after 1650.

The present manor house bears a date stone inscribed with the year 1598. The upper flight of the staircase has early 17th century pierced balusters. Other details were added to the house in the 20th century.

The Domesday Book records that by 1086 Water Stratford had a watermill, presumably on the River Great Ouse. It is recorded again in 1278–79, but it was destroyed in 1349 by Isabel de Stratford, widow of a Lord of the manor of Water Stratford.

== Parish church ==
The Church of England parish church of Saint Giles was built in the 12th century. The south doorway is Norman and has a finely carved tympanum of Christ in Majesty. The chancel arch and one lancet window on either side in the chancel are 13th century. The tower was built in the 14th century and some Decorated Gothic and Perpendicular Gothic windows were added over the centuries. The tower was reduced in height in the 18th century. The church was almost entirely rebuilt in 1828, but unusually for that period its original features were preserved and replaced apparently in situ. The tower has three bells. St. Giles' is a Grade I listed building.

== Notable people ==
John Mason (1645–94) was parish priest of St. Giles. He was a Puritan, admired by fellow-clergy including Richard Baxter. Mason wrote more than 30 hymns, including the still popular Anglican hymn How shall I sing that majesty.

In the last years of his life Mason's mental health deteriorated. From 1690 he preached that the Second Coming of Christ was imminent. He claimed he was the prophet Elijah and that he would be raised from the dead three days after his death. From 1693 hundreds of followers flocked to Water Stratford, where they lived in barns or camped in a field awaiting the Second Coming. Mason died on 22 May 1694. His followers' belief was so strong that his successor as parish priest had Mason's corpse exhumed to disprove his claim of resurrection. Still some of Mason's followers refused to leave, and stayed at Water Stratford awaiting his resurrection for up to 15 years when they were dispersed by the local militia.

Joseph Bosworth (1788–1876), scholar of Old English, author of the first Anglo-Saxon dictionary, and Professor of Anglo-Saxon at the University of Oxford from 1858 to 1876, was parish priest of St. Giles from 1858.

More recent former residents are Paul Daniels, magician, Peter Woodthorpe, actor, and Yana, (real name Pamela Guard).

== See also ==
Other Stratfords in Buckinghamshire

- Stony Stratford
- Old Stratford
- Fenny Stratford

== Sources ==
- Page, William, ed. (1927). "Parishes: Water Stratford". A History of the County of Buckingham, Volume 4. Victoria County History. pp. 260–263.
- Pevsner, Nikolaus (1973) [1960]. Buckinghamshire. The Buildings of England. Harmondsworth: Penguin Books. pp. 277–278. ISBN 0-14-071019-1.
- Timms, George, ed. (1986). New English Hymnal. Norwich: Canterbury Press. p. 803. ISBN 0-907547-51-6.
