= Charles Mayo (Anglo-Saxon scholar) =

English clergyman and professor of Anglo-Saxon

Charles Mayo (1767–1858) was an English clergyman and professor of Anglo-Saxon.

== Life ==
Born in London 24 March 1767, he was second son of Herbert Mayo, D.D. (1720–1802), by his wife Mary, daughter of George Coldham, surgeon extraordinary to the Prince of Wales. Charles was admitted to Merchant Taylors' School, 1776, and elected to St John's College, Oxford, 1785, where he became Fellow in 1788. He graduated M.A. 1793, and B.D. 1796.

In 1795 he was elected the first Rawlinsonian Professor of Anglo-Saxon, being the first to hold the Oxford position, which had a tenure of five years. Samuel Parr states that his lectures were applauded. Mayo took holy orders and was Whitehall preacher 1799–1800, and morning lecturer at the old chapel of St Michael, Highgate for thirty years. He was elected Fellow of the Society of Antiquaries in 1820, Fellow of the Royal Society in 1827, and a governor of Cholmeley School in Highgate 1842.

He resided during most of his life at Cheshunt, Hertfordshire, where he inherited in 1824 the manor of Andrewes and Le Motte from his grandmother Rebecca, daughter of Sir John Shaw, bart. He married Louisa, daughter of James Landon, but died without issue 10 December 1858, aged 91 years. He was buried at Cheshunt.
