= Eric Stanley =

British Anglo-Saxonist academic (1923-2018)

Eric Stanley FBA
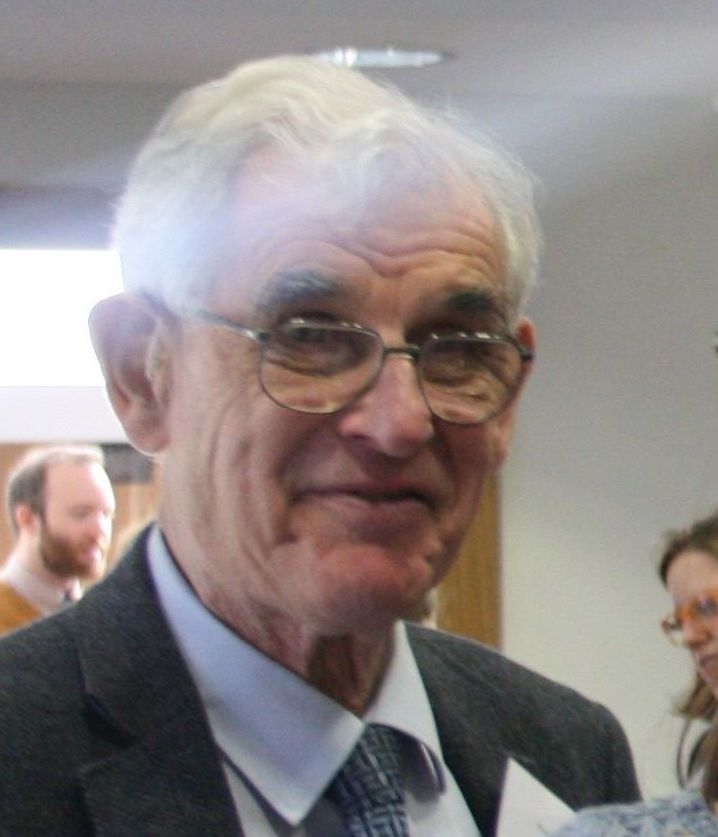
- Professor Eric Stanley at the 2015 Oxford Medieval Graduate Conference
- Born: 19 October 1923; Germany
- Died: 20 June 2018 (aged 94)
- Occupation: Scholar
- Title: Rawlinson and Bosworth Professor of Anglo-Saxon
- Board member of: Fellow of Pembroke College, Oxford
- Spouse: Mary Bateman (m. 1959)
- Children: 1

Academic work
- Discipline: Medieval literature
- Sub-discipline: Old English literature, philology

Eric Gerald Stanley, FBA (19 October 1923 – 20 June 2018) was a German-British Anglo-Saxonist; he was Rawlinson and Bosworth Professor of Anglo-Saxon and Fellow of Pembroke College, Oxford, from 1977 to 1991 and was emeritus professor until his death.

== Early life and education ==
Stanley was born in Germany; in 1934 his family moved to England to escape Nazi Germany, and he was educated at Queen Elizabeth's Grammar School in Blackburn and at University College, Oxford, to which he won a scholarship in 1941. He served in the Second World War.

== Career ==
He taught at Birmingham University from 1951 to 1962, then at Queen Mary College, London, first as Reader and from 1964 as Professor in English Language and Literature. In 1975 he took up a professorship at Yale University, in the United States, before being elected Rawlinson and Bosworth Professor of Anglo-Saxon at Oxford beginning in 1977. He retired in 1991 and became emeritus professor.

Stanley was one of three editors of the journal Notes and Queries from 1963, and an associate editor until his death.

He also contributed to the Oxford English Dictionary from his undergraduate years until shortly before his death; he became involved in collecting materials for the second supplement in 1957, commented on the proofs beginning in 1962, and was involved in critiquing all materials up to approximately 1325, and the later history of many words, for the revision that began in the mid-1990s. In addition he read and commented on all entries in the Toronto Dictionary of Old English.

== Honours ==
Stanley was elected a fellow of the British Academy in 1985 and a corresponding fellow of the Medieval Academy of America in 2008. A Festschrift was published in his honour in 1996.

== Personal life ==
While teaching at Birmingham, Stanley was influenced by his colleague Geoffrey Shepherd both as a scholar and in commitment to religion. He became a devout Anglican, and right up until his death was a sidesman at the 8 o’clock BCP service of Holy Communion at St Giles’, Oxford. He described his political views as "to the right of Genghis Khan". but this was one of his many jokes. No socialist, he was nevertheless happy to vote for the Lib Dems. The Leave Vote in 2016 shocked him deeply not only because he was committed to EU membership but also, given his early years as a refugee from Nazi Germany, because he was vehemently opposed to plebiscites. Taught to drive by Robert Burchfield at the OED, he made many car trips to Europe, including annually to Italy, with his wife; in 1959 he married Mary Bateman, a neurologist. She died in 2016. Their only daughter, a consultant forensic psychiatrist, died in 2017. Stanley had a great gift for friendship. He had friends all over the world and gave wonderful dinner parties at his house in Oxford. When his wife had become infirm, he joked, "In my dotage, I've become a cook". His dotage never happened, but his dinner parties were legendary.

== Publications ==
- Continuations and Beginnings: Studies in Old English Literature. London: Nelson, 1966. OCLC 490782477.
- The Search for Anglo-Saxon Paganism. Cambridge: Brewer, 1975. ISBN 9780859910088.
- In the Foreground: 'Beowulf'. Cambridge: Brewer, 1994. ISBN 9780859913942.
- Imagining the Anglo-Saxon Past: The Search for Anglo-Saxon Paganism and Anglo-Saxon Trial by Jury. Cambridge: Cambridge University, 2012. ISBN 9781846153280.

Academic offices
Preceded by Alistair Campbell	Rawlinson and Bosworth Professor of Anglo-Saxon; University of Oxford; 1977–1991	Succeeded by Malcolm Godden
