= An Anglo-Saxon Dictionary =

Dictionary of Old English

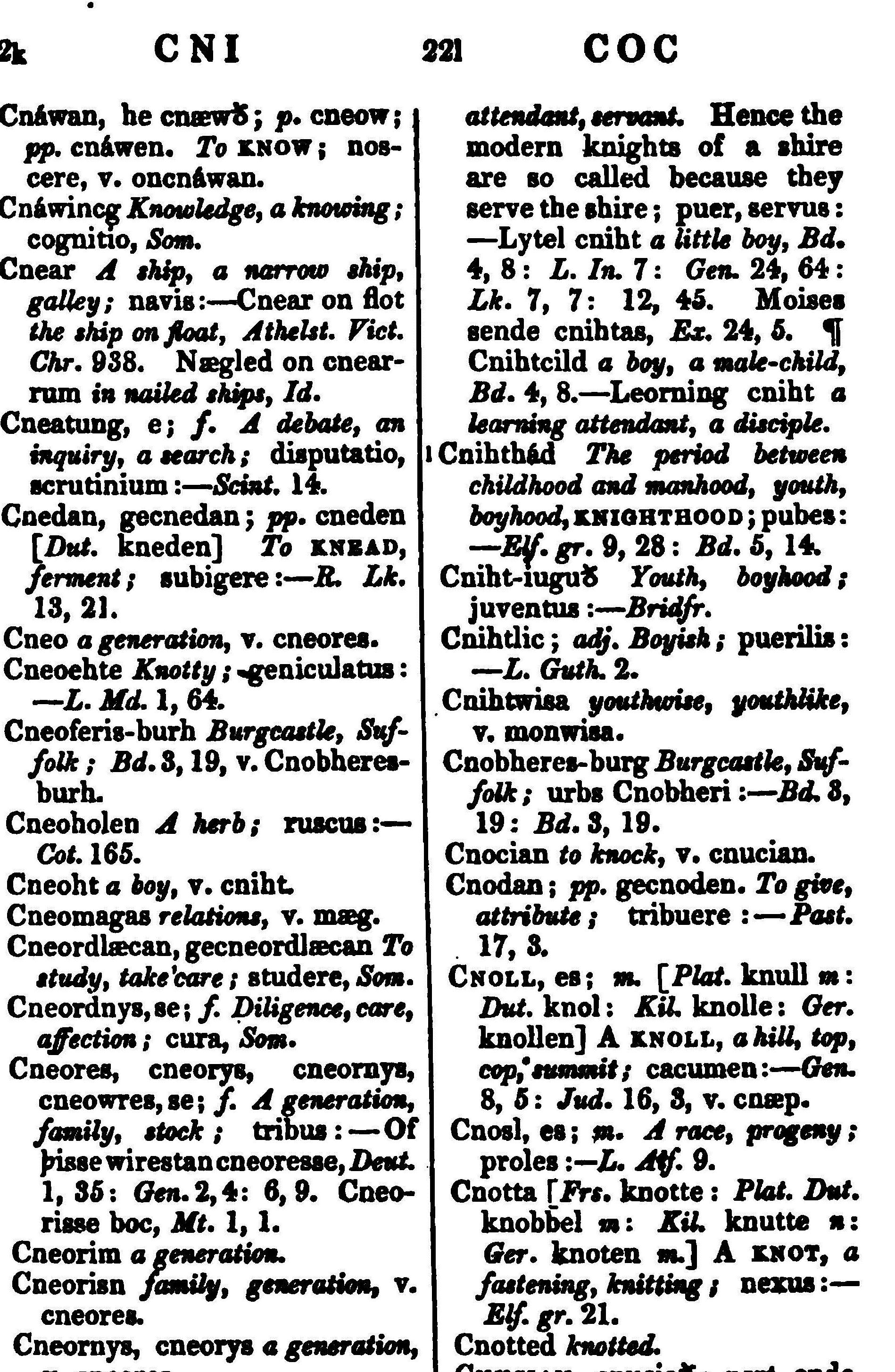
A page from the 1838 edition of Bosworth's Dictionary

An Anglo-Saxon Dictionary is a dictionary of Old English (also known as Anglo-Saxon) complied by Joseph Bosworth and Thomas Northcote Toller in the nineteenth century. Four editions of the dictionary were published. It has often (especially in earlier times) been considered the definitive lexicon for Old English. It is often referred to by the names of its compilers, for example Bosworth or Bosworth & Toller.

== Editions ==
=== 1838 edition ===
This was written by Joseph Bosworth, who in 1858 became the Rawlinsonian Professor of Anglo-Saxon at the University of Oxford: the post was renamed in 1916 as the Rawlinson and Bosworth Professorship of Anglo-Saxon, in Bosworth's honour.

=== 1898 edition ===
While being attributed to "J. Bosworth & T. N. Toller", this was a revision by Thomas Northcote Toller, based on Bosworth's 1838 dictionary, Bosworth's papers, and additions by Toller.

=== 1921 edition ===
Thomas Northcote Toller issued a supplement in 1921.

=== 1972 edition ===
Alistair Campbell issued an edition with "enlarged addenda and corrigenda" in 1972.

== See also ==
- Toronto Dictionary of Old English, an attempt to compile a comprehensive and exhaustive dictionary beginning in 1970, founding editors Angus Cameron and Christopher Ball.
