= Gale Owen-Crocker =

Professor emerita of the University of Manchester, England

Gale Owen-Crocker (born 16 January 1947) is a professor emerita of the University of Manchester, England. Before her retirement she was Professor of Anglo-Saxon Culture and Director of the Manchester Centre for Anglo-Saxon Studies.

== Early life and education ==
Gale Redfern Owen was born and raised in Newcastle upon Tyne, and earned a first class degree with honors in English language and literature from Newcastle University in 1968 and a PhD with a thesis on Anglo-Saxon dress in 1976, also from Newcastle.

== Career ==
After teaching at her former school and at Newcastle University while a student, Owen then took up a teaching position at the University of Manchester, where she remained until retiring as Professor of Anglo-Saxon Culture and Director of the Manchester Centre for Anglo-Saxon Studies in 2015. She became Gale Owen-Crocker upon her marriage to Richard Crocker in 1981. She is now professor emerita.

Owen-Crocker co-founded and co-edited Volumes 1 through 14 of the journal Medieval Clothing and Textiles with Robin Netherton, and began a phased transition to the new editorial team in 2017 for Volume 15 and beyond. She was editor-in-chief for Brill's Encyclopaedia of Medieval Dress and Textiles of the British Isles c. 450-1450 (2012).

Owen-Crocker has published six monographs, including one that is a collection of her papers on the Bayeux Tapestry, as well as eighteen edited or co-edited books and over 150 articles on Anglo-Saxon culture and Medieval Dress and Textiles.

Her scholarship has been honored in two publications: A Festschrift edited by Maren Clegg Hyer and Jill Frederick in 2016 entitled Textiles, Text, Intertext: Essays in Honour of Gale R. Owen-Crocker (Boydell Press), and Making Sense of the Bayeux Tapestry: Readings and Reworkings, co-edited by Anna C. Henderson and Gale R. Owen-Crocker (Manchester: Manchester University Press, 2016).

Owen-Crocker has delivered lectures internationally and has been invited to speak at academic conferences and universities. She has also contributed to historical reenactment groups. She has been consulted as an expert on the Bayeux Tapestry and was interviewed in The Telegraph in connection with debates over its proposed loan to the United Kingdom. In the 2026 article, she emphasized the risks involved, noting that "even minor mishandling could cause irreversible damage."

== Bibliography ==
- "Wynflæd's Wardrobe", Anglo-Saxon England, vol 8, 1979, pp. 195–202.
- Rites and Religions of the Anglo-Saxons. Newton Abbot: David & Charles, 1981.
- Dress in Anglo-Saxon England. Manchester: Manchester UP, 1986.
  - Dress in Anglo Saxon England: Revised and Enlarged Edition. Woodbridge: Boydell Press, 2004.
- The Four Funerals in Beowulf: and the structure of the poem. Manchester: Manchester UP, St Martins Press, 2000.
- The Bayeux Tapestry: Collected Papers. Variorum Collected Studies Series. Farnham: Ashgate, 2012.
- Medieval Textiles of the British Isles AD 450-1100: An Annotated Bibliography. With Elizabeth Coatsworth. British Archeological Reports, British Series 445. Oxford: Archaeopress, 2007.
- Clothing the Past: Surviving Garments from Early Medieval to Early Modern Western Europe. With Elizabeth Coatsworth. Leiden: Brill, 2018.
