= Penelope Walton Rogers =

British archaeologist (1950–2023)

Penelope Walton Rogers FSA
- Born: 1950; Newcastle-upon-Tyne, England
- Died: 10 November 2023 (age 73); York, England

Academic work
- Discipline: Archaeology
- Sub-discipline: Archaeological textiles

Penelope Walton Rogers FSA (1950 – 10 November 2023) was a British archaeologist and expert in archaeological textiles.

== Early life ==
Walton Rogers was born in Newcastle-upon-Tyne in 1950. Her mother managed a typing pool, and her father was an accountant. The family later moved to Darlington. She won a scholarship to Girton College, University of Cambridge at age 17, but was unable to attend due to her lifelong agoraphobia.

== Career ==
Walton Rogers began her career in the 1970s as a volunteer at archaeological digs at Hadrian's Wall and beneath York Minster.

Instead of attending Girton, she went to work as a field archaeologist before working as a Finds Officer for York Minster Archaeologists. Walton Rogers then set up an independent finds research practice in the 1980s, which eventually became the Anglo Saxon Laboratory, which was formally established in 2001. The lab analyzed textiles, animal furs, and other archaeological finds, specializing in Anglo-Saxon culture from the 5th to 11th centuries A.D.

She also founded Pangur's Press, which published both new and reprinted monographs in her field, including her own 2007 work Cloth and Clothing in Anglo-Saxon England AD450-700.

== Honors ==
On 10 October 1996, Walton Rogers was elected as a Fellow of the Society of Antiquaries of London. She was also a Visiting Fellow at the University of York.

== Death ==
Walton Rogers died in York on 10 November 2023, at the age of 73. Her friend and colleague Alan Wilkinson, who wrote her obituary for the Guardian newspaper in January 2024, called her achievements as an archaeologist "monumentally heroic", noting that her condition made it difficult for her to travel more than a few hundred yards from her flat.

== Selected bibliography ==
- Walton Rogers, P. 1989. Textiles, Cordage and Raw Fibre from 16-22 Coppergate (Archaeology of York 17/5). York: CBA/York Archaeological Trust.
- Walton Rogers, P. 1997. Textile Production at 16-22 Coppergate (The Archaeology of York 17/11). York: CBA/York Archaeological Trust.
- Walton Rogers, P. 2007. Cloth and Clothing in Early Anglo-Saxon England (AD 450-700) (CBA Research Report 145). York: CBA.
- Walton Rogers, P. 2013. "Tyttel’s Halh: The Anglo-Saxon Cemetery at Tittleshall, Norfolk", East Anglian Archaeology 150.
- Walton Rogers, P. 2020. "Chapter 5. Textile networks in Viking-Age towns of Britain and Ireland", in SP Ashby and SM Sindbæk (eds), Crafts and Social Networks in Viking Towns, 83–122. Oxford and Philadelphia: Oxbow.
