= John Earle (professor) =

British Anglo-Saxon language scholar (1824–1903)

- Born: 29 January 1824; Elston, Churchstow, South Devon, England
- Died: 31 January 1903 (aged 79); Oxford, England
- Education: University of Oxford
- Occupation: Anglo-Saxon language scholar
- Years active: 1848–1903
- Spouse: Jane Rolleston (m. 1863)

John Earle (29 January 1824 – 31 January 1903) was a British Anglo-Saxon language scholar. He was twice Rawlinsonian Professor of Anglo-Saxon in the University of Oxford.

Earle wrote more than a dozen books and was the author of Two Saxon Chronicles Parallel (1865), and Anglo-Saxon Literature (1884). Charles Plummer edited Earle's Two Saxon Chronicles Parallel, producing a Revised Text with notes, appendices, and glossary in 1892.

== Early life and education ==
Earle was born at Elston, Churchstow, South Devon, on 29 January 1824, the oldest son of John Earle who was a farmer and landowner. Earle was educated at Oriel College, Oxford, where he obtained first-class honors in classics.

== Career ==
Earle was elected a fellow in 1848 and in 1857 became rector of Swanswick, near Bath. Earle became a prebendary of Wells, which was a small cathedral city of Somerset, in 1871. His recreations were boating, riding and gardening.

Earle held the position of Professor of Anglo-Saxon at Oxford as well as the rectory of Swanswick until his death.

== Personal life and death ==
In 1863, he married Jane Rolleston, the daughter of Rev. George Rolleston (rector and squire of Maltby, W. Riding, father of George Rolleston).

His address in the 1903 Who's Who (UK) is listed as Swanswick Rectory, Bath, 84 Banbury Road, Oxford. He died there on 31 January 1903.

== Positions held ==
- Fellow of Oriel, 1848
- College Tutor, 1852
- Rector of Swanswick (near Bath) 1857
- Rawlinson and Bosworth Professor of Anglo-Saxon 1849–1854
- Rawlinson and Bosworth Professor of Anglo-Saxon 1876–1903
- Prebendary of Wells since 1871
- Select Preacher, Oxford University, 1873-1874
- Rural Dean of Bath, 1873-1877

== Bibliography ==
- Gloucester Fragments of St. Swithun (1861)
- Bath, Ancient and Modern (1864)
- Two Saxon Chronicles Parallel (1865)
- The Philology of the English Tongue (1871)
- A Book for the Beginner in Anglo-Saxon (1877)
- English Plant Names from the Tenth to the Fifteenth Century (1880)
- Anglo-Saxon Literature (1884)
- A Handbook to the Land Charters (1888)
- English Prose: its Elements, History, and Usage (1890)
- The Deeds of Beowulf (1892)
- The Psalter of 1539 (1894)
- A Simple Grammar of English Now in Use (1898)
- The Alfred Jewel: an Historical Essay (1901)
