= William Craigie =

Scottish philologist and lexicographer (1867–1957)

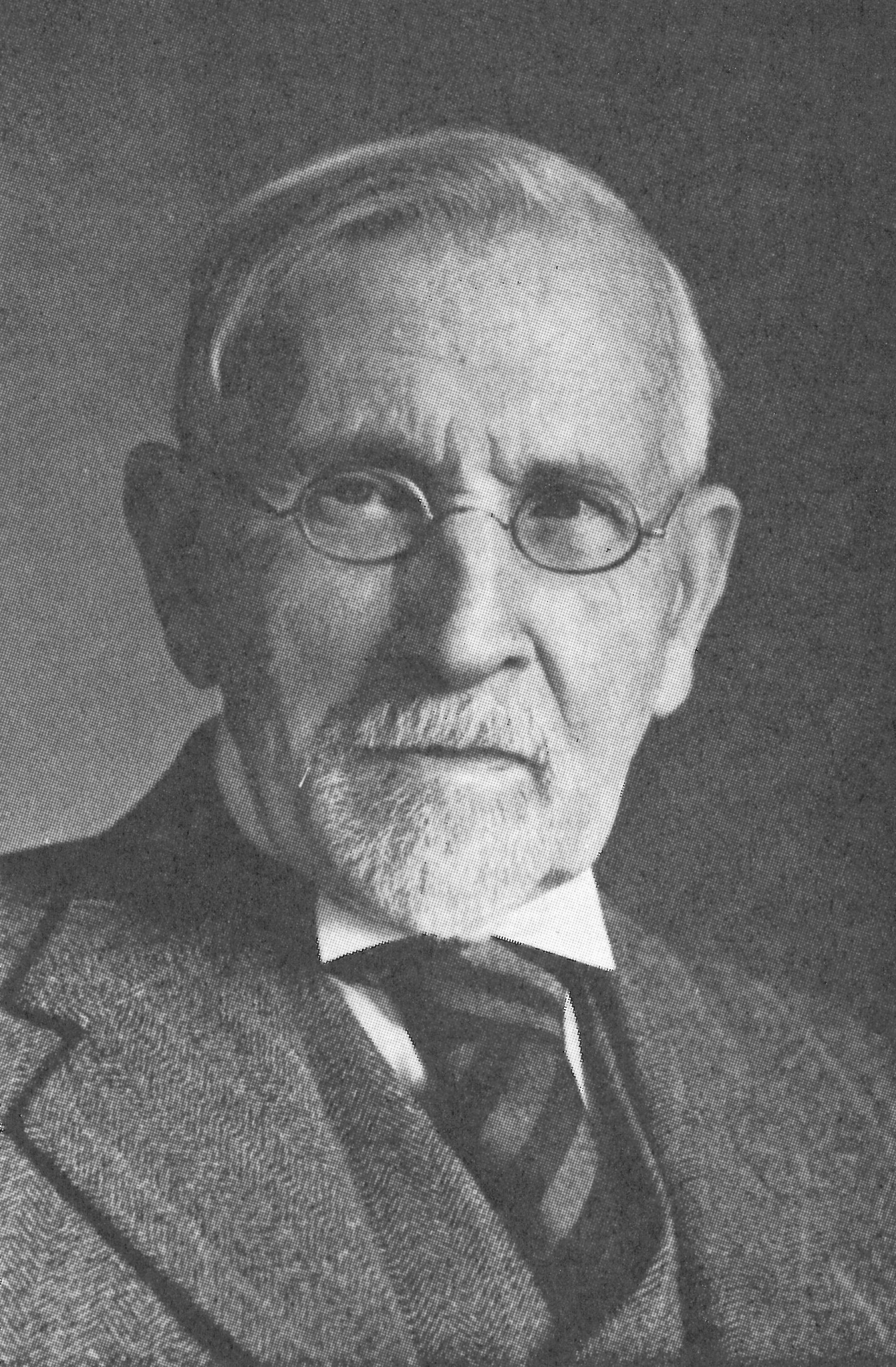
Sir William A. Craigie

Sir William Alexander Craigie (13 August 1867 – 2 September 1957) was a philologist and a lexicographer.

A graduate of the University of St Andrews, he was the third editor of the Oxford English Dictionary and co-editor (with C. T. Onions) of the 1933 supplement. From 1916 to 1925 he was also Rawlinson and Bosworth Professor of Anglo-Saxon in the University of Oxford. Among the students he tutored, was the one who would succeed him in the Anglo-Saxon chair, J. R. R. Tolkien. He married Jessie Kinmond Hutchen of Dundee (born 1864–65; died 1947) daughter of William.

In 1925, Craigie accepted a professorship in English literature from the University of Chicago, with plans to edit a new American English dictionary, based on the Oxford model. He also lectured on lexicography at Chicago, while working on the Dictionary of American English and the Dictionary of the Older Scottish Tongue, a project he pioneered. Many twentieth-century American lexicographers studied under Craigie as a part of his lectureship, including Clarence Barnhart, Jess Stein, Woodford A. Heflin, Robert Ramsey, Louise Pound, and Allen Walker Read. Cragie retired to Watlington, England in 1936. He was elected an International member of the American Philosophical Society in 1942.

Craigie was also fluent in Icelandic and an expert in the field of rímur (rhyming epic poems). He made many valuable contributions in that field. His interest was awakened by a winter of study in Copenhagen, then the centre of Norse philology. He compiled the complete Oxford edition of Hans Christian Andersen's fairy tales, with previously untranslated tales being supplied by his wife. He befriended many of the great Norse philologists of the time and came across séra Einar Guðmundsson's seventeenth-century Skotlands rímur, dealing with the Gowrie Conspiracy. He continued research in that field until the end of his life.

Craigie was knighted in the 1928 Birthday Honours.
