= Rawlinson and Bosworth Professor of Anglo-Saxon =

Professorship at the University of Oxford

The Rawlinson and Bosworth Professorship of Anglo-Saxon, until 1916 known as the Rawlinsonian Professorship of Anglo-Saxon, is a professorial chair at the University of Oxford established by Richard Rawlinson of St John's College, Oxford, in 1795. The Chair is associated with Pembroke College. "Bosworth" was added to commemorate Joseph Bosworth.

== Rawlinsonian Professors of Anglo-Saxon ==
- 1795–1800 Charles Mayo (1767–1858)
- 1800–03 Thomas Hardcastle
- 1803–08 James Ingram (1774–1850)
- 1808–12 John Josias Conybeare (1779–1824)
- 1812–16 Charles Dyson (1788–1860)
- 1827–29 Arthur Johnson
- 1829–34 Francis Pearson Walesby (1798–1858)
- 1834–39 Robert Meadows White (1798–1865)
- 1839–44 Henry Bristow Wilson (1803–1888)
- 1844–49 William Edward Buckley (1817–1892)
- 1849–54 John Earle (1824–1903)
- 1854–58 vacant
- 1858–76 Joseph Bosworth (1789–1876)
- 1876–1903 John Earle (1824–1903)
- 1903–16 Arthur Napier (1853–1916)

== Rawlinson and Bosworth Professors of Anglo-Saxon ==
- 1916–25 Sir William Craigie (1867–1957)
- 1925–45 J. R. R. Tolkien (1892–1973)
- 1946–63 Charles Leslie Wrenn (1895–1969)
- 1963–74 Alistair Campbell (1907–1974)
- 1974–77 vacant
- 1977–91 Eric Stanley (1923–2018)
- 1991–2013 Malcolm Godden (born 1945)
- 2013–present Andy Orchard (born 1964)

== See also ==
- List of professorships at the University of Oxford

== Sources ==
- The Historical Register of the University of Oxford. Oxford: Clarendon Press, 1888
- "Rawlinson and Bosworth Professor of Anglo-Saxon", ox.ac.uk
