= Mount Sunday =

New Zealand hill used as a Lord of the Rings set

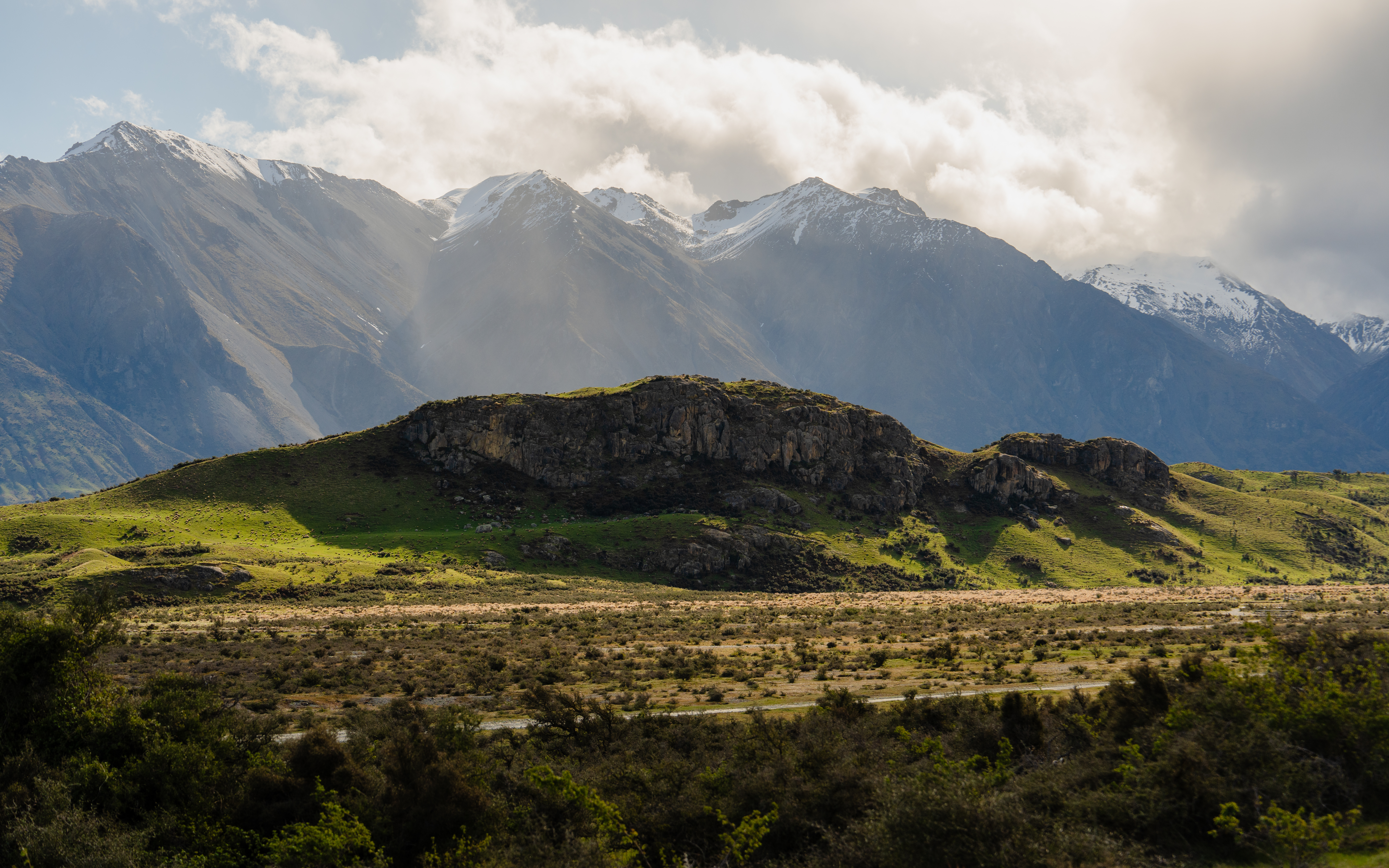
- Mount Sunday in front of the Two Thumb Range

Highest point
- Elevation: 611 m (2,005 ft)
- Coordinates: 43°32′53″S 170°53′35″E

Geography
- Location within New Zealand
- Location: South Island, New Zealand
- Parent range: Southern Alps

Mount Sunday is an isolated hill in the inland Canterbury region of New Zealand's South Island. It was chosen as the location for the settlement of Edoras in The Lord of the Rings films and has since become a tourist attraction.

== Location ==
Mount Sunday rises above the floodplain of the upper Rangitata River, just up from where the Potts River joins it, in Ashburton District, Canterbury, New Zealand. To the north is Mount Potts in the Potts Range, and directly across the river is Black Mountain and the Two Thumb Range. It is about two hours by car from Christchurch, near the end of the road leading to Erewhon Station. To reach the hill involves 17 kilometres of gravel road, a ford, and two stream crossings; the final access to the summit is by foot only.

Northwest of Mount Sunday the Rangitata has its origin at the junction of the Clyde and Havelock rivers. This confluence inspired the name of the original large sheep station here, Mesopotamia Station (from the Ancient Greek: Μεσοποταμία, '[land] between rivers'). British writer Samuel Butler arrived in 1860 and ran sheep there four years; he chose the area as the setting of his 1872 Utopian novel Erewhon or Over the Range ("Erewhon" being an anagram of Nowhere). Butler accurately described the landscape:

"Beyond the downs was a plain, going down to a river of great size, on the farther side of which there were other high mountains, with the winter's snow not quite melted; up the river, which ran winding in many streams over a bed some two miles broad, I looked upon the second great chain, and could see a narrow gorge where the river retired and was lost."

Mesopotamia included the two present-day sheep stations Erewhon and Mount Potts, which Mount Sunday sits between. The hill takes its name from the habit of shepherds from both stations riding the boundaries to meet here on Sundays.

== Geology ==
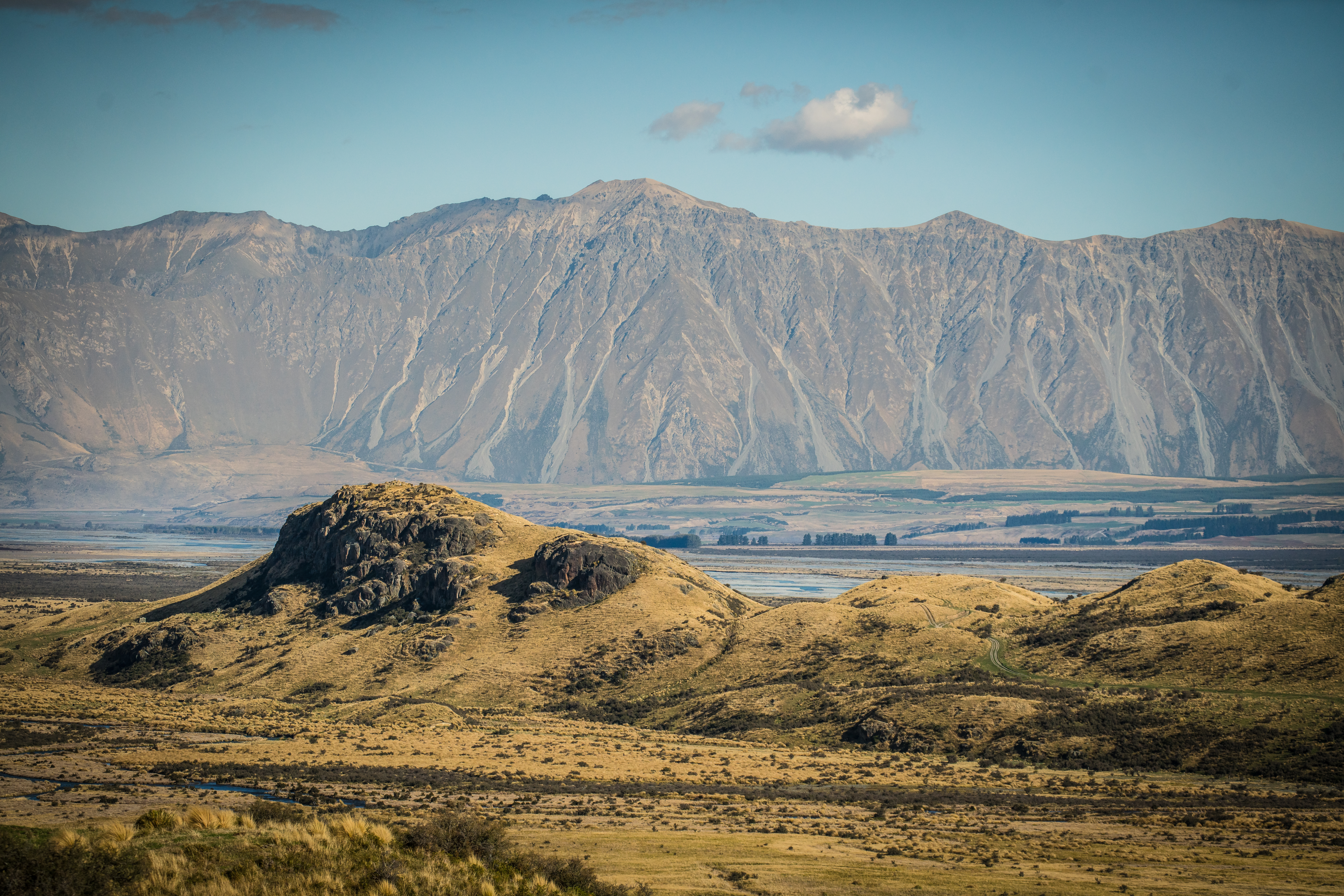
Mount Sunday showing the asymmetry of a roche moutonnée

Mount Sunday is a roche moutonnée, a rock formation created by glacial action during previous ice ages. Multiple times in the Pleistocene the Rangitata Glacier advanced down the valley; its last advance reached its maximum extent 28,000 years ago in the Ashburton Lakes area, and by 15,000 years ago the glaciers had retreated to the valleys of the upper Clyde and Havelock Rivers. The advance and retreat of the Rangitata Glacier asymmetrically eroded the underlying hill, tearing rock from the downstream or lee side and abrading the upstream or stoss side; Mount Sunday is noticeably steeper and more craggy on its southeastern face. The summit displays the characteristic gougings of glacial action.

== Lord of the Rings ==
During location scouting for Peter Jackson's Lord of the Rings films, a storm forced the aircraft to change course, and they flew over Mount Sunday, which was picked as the setting for Edoras, the capital of Rohan. The film crew took eleven months to build the set, constructing a road to the hill, houses, stables, and an elaborate Golden Hall of the Kings on its summit, and other buildings at the foot, with the remainder of the village added in post-production.

At the time there was debate over preserving the set as a possible tourist destination, but in 1999 after three weeks of filming it was dismantled, and Mount Sunday was returned to its natural state. Several reasons were given, from the nondurable nature of the buildings to copyright issues, as well as the site being Crown land, grazed by Mount Potts station with special permission, situated inside Hakatere Conservation Park. In the 2003 Land Tenure Review process Mount Sunday was noted to have "contemporary heritage value, as it provided the setting for the mythical village of Edoras during the filming of Lord of the Rings". Richard Taylor, head of Wētā Workshop, described Mount Sunday as his favourite filming location in the series.

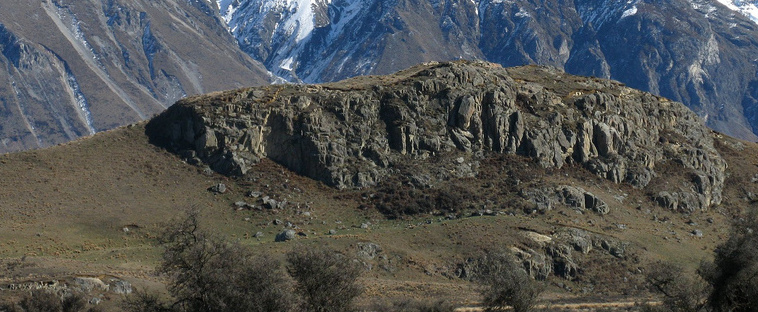
Mount Sunday from the east

The set of Edoras constructed for The Two Towers

== Tourism ==
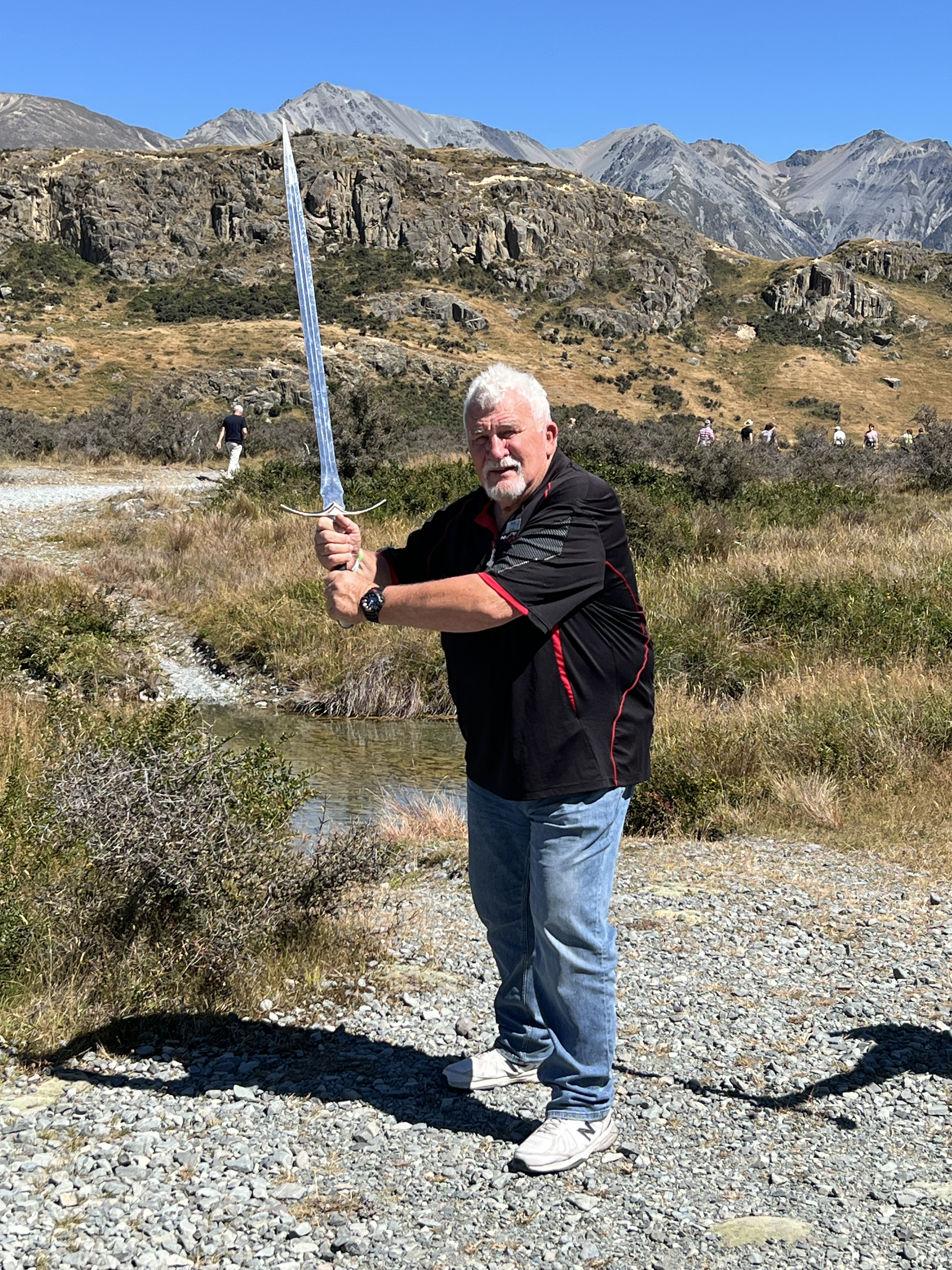
Tour bus driver posing with a prop sword in front of Mount Sunday

Even during the construction of the set on Mount Sunday day-trippers were arriving from throughout Canterbury to see the film location; one journalist hired a light aircraft to fly over the area and the resulting photographs were published worldwide. Tourism was self-organised, and the Ashburton District Council issued a leaflet setting out preparations, such as warm clothing and vehicle maintenance, that tourists would need to make. Unprepared visitors found the road conditions and remote setting were challenging, and Mount Sunday itself difficult to reach as there was no official road access; search and rescue was at times required.

Eventually, licences were granted to six and then nine different tourism operators, bringing up to eight tour groups to the site daily. These were at first mini-buses or 4WD vehicles, with up to 10 passengers per tour, and access to Mount Sunday required climbing fences and wading through streams. Later a gravel car park was created for large tour buses, and trails and two bridges were constructed. An easy 1.5 km walking track to the top of Mount Sunday, maintained by the Department of Conservation, now gives views of the surrounding mountain ranges. The site is popular during cruise ship season, with several busloads of tourists coming from Lyttelton and back each day. Tourists can pose with replica weapons in front of the hill, but most tours do not allow enough time to climb to the summit and back (30 minutes each way).

In the mid-2000s, interviews with tourists revealed that one third of those visiting the site had not read the Lord of the Rings books or seen the films, and were treating the tour as an opportunity to visit the South Island high country. Most of the tourists were from Australia, the UK, or the United States, aged mid-20s to mid-40s, and had been planning the visit for at least two months. Even though none of the original Edoras set remained, a significant number of tourists interviewed between 2004 and 2006 at the site claimed to have been "emotionally touched" by the visit, comparing it to the "Holy Grail" of their Tolkien film pilgrimage. With the publication of the Lord of the Rings Location Guidebook in 2002, Mount Sunday became a significant part of New Zealand's tourism marketing, and its image was used in promotions by local and national tour operators and the District Council.

== Gallery ==
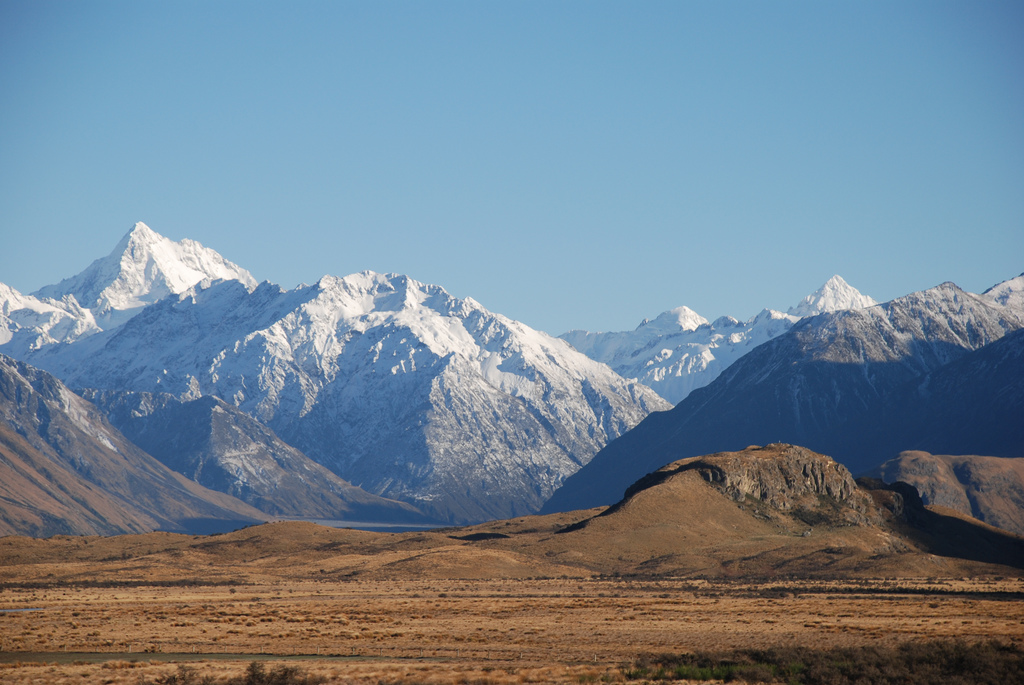
Two Thumb range behind Mount Sunday

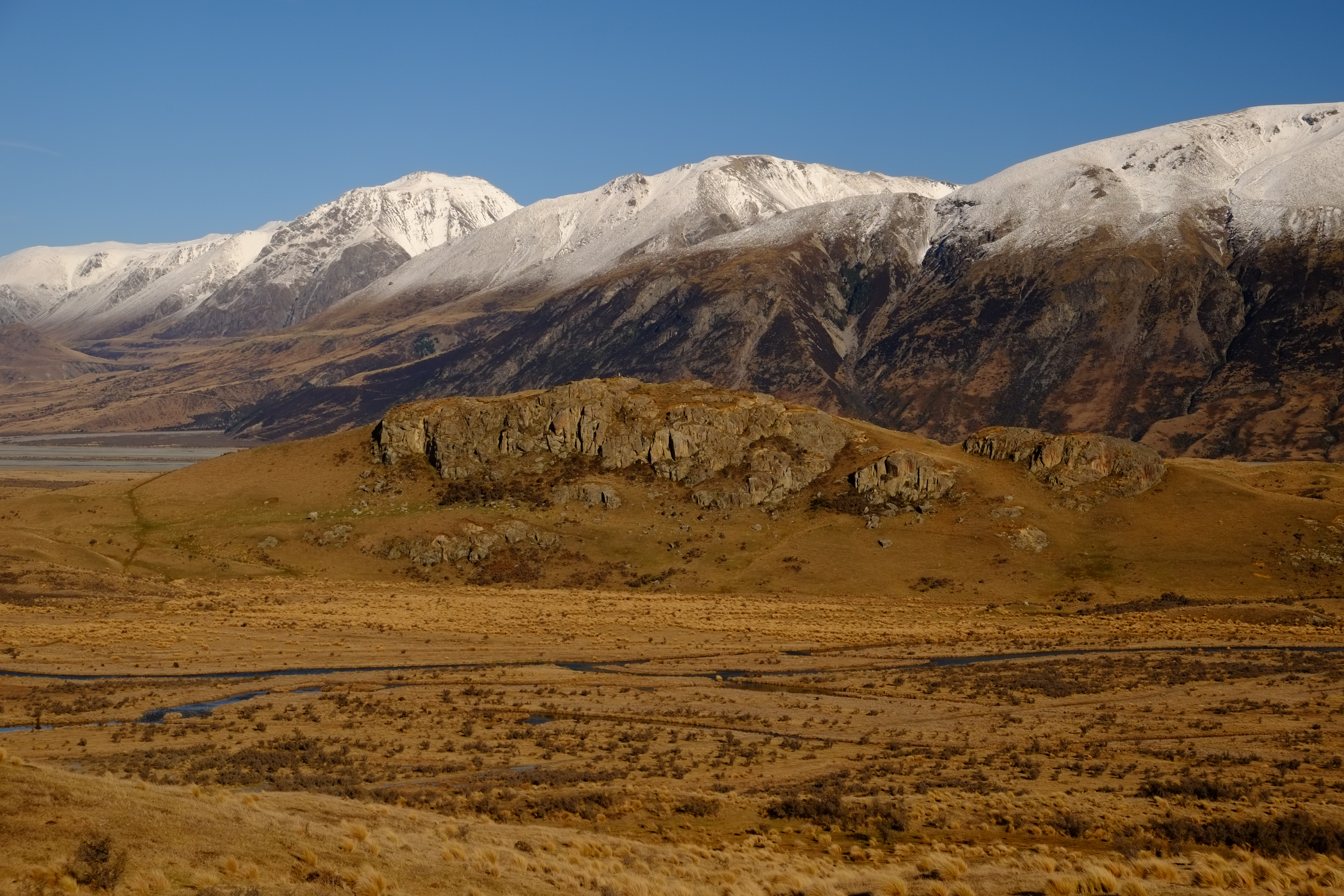
Mt Sunday viewed from the north on Mt Potts

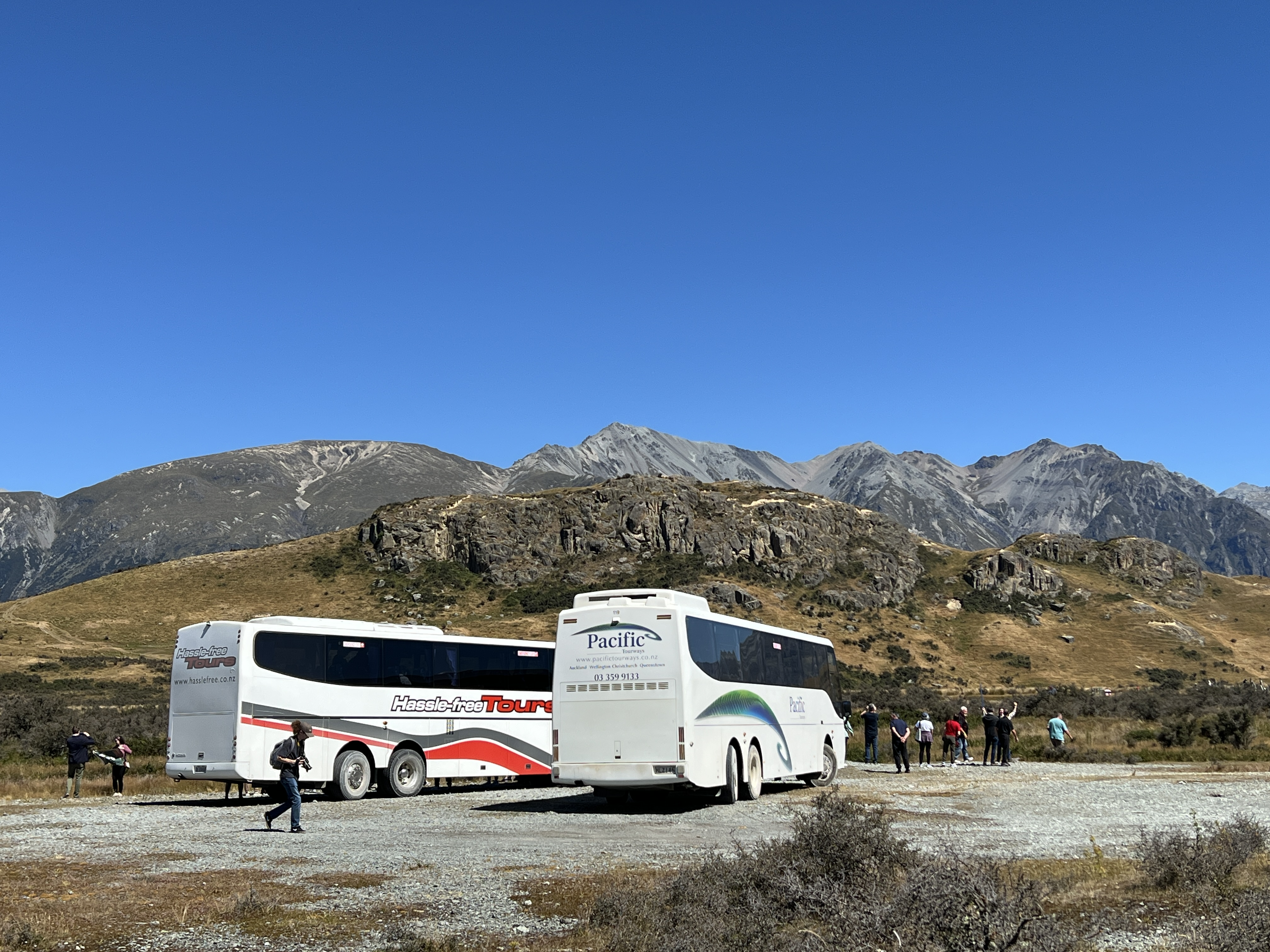
Tour buses in the car park

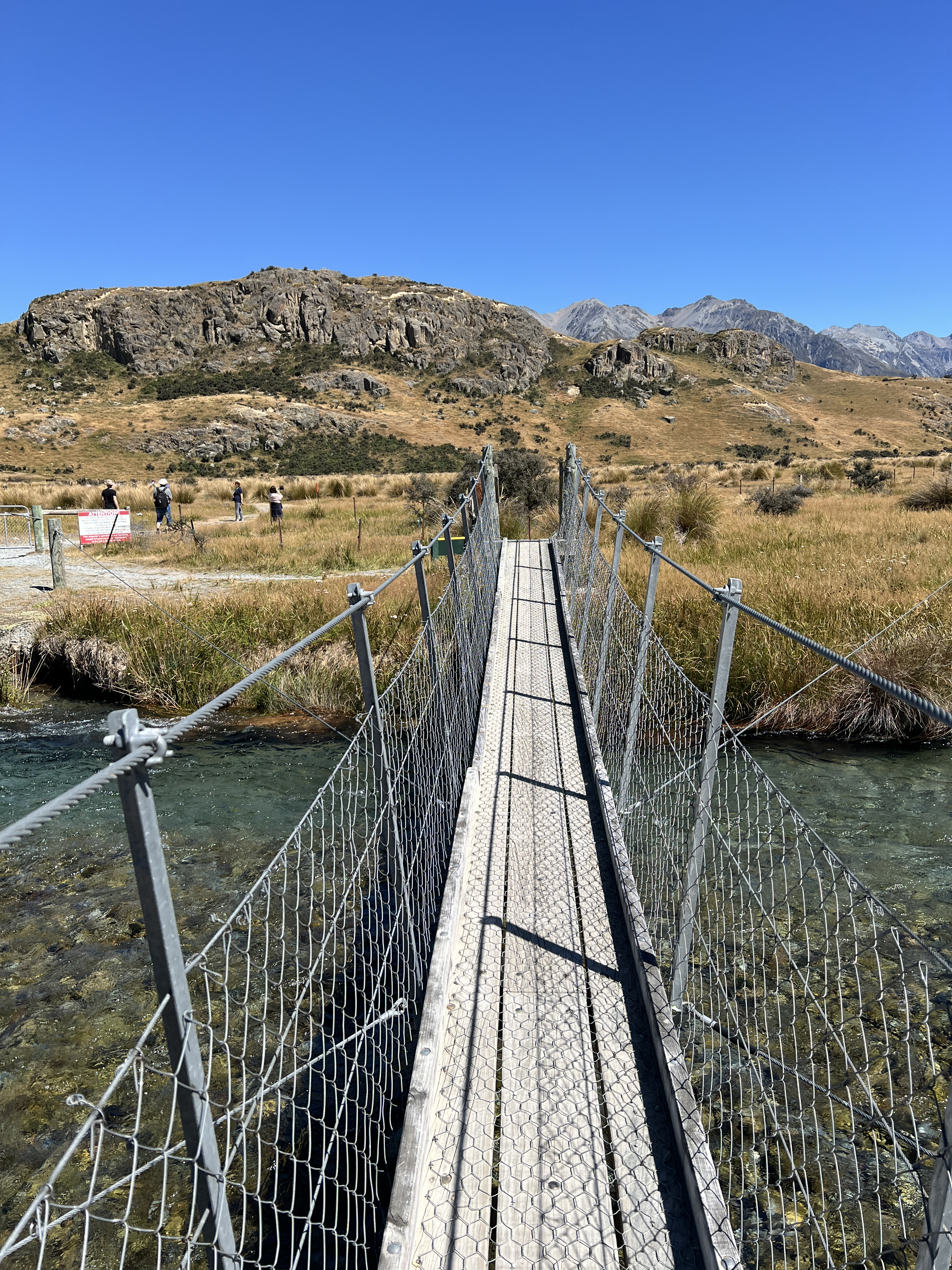
The swingbridge on the Mount Sunday track

== See also ==
- Mount Potts
- Tolkien tourism
