= James Bond fandom =

International, informal fan base

The James Bond fandom (also known as The Bond Community) is an international and informal community drawn together by Ian Fleming's James Bond series. The fandom works through the use of many different forms of media, including fan clubs, web sites and fanzines.

Various Bond film shooting locations have become fan tourism locations.

== Fan clubs and fan web sites ==
The first James Bond Fan Club was founded in 1972 by Richard Schenkman and Bob Forlini, two high school students from Yonkers, NY. In 1974 they began publishing a magazine called BONDAGE, which was at first mimeographed and stapled together.

The James Bond British Fan Club was founded in 1979 and went through various impressive incarnations until it became nothing more than a news website.

MI6-HQ.com was founded in 1998. Press organisations and websites that mention this site include Entertainment Weekly and MTV. The site maintains a comprehensive listing of the films' technological features and a user forum.

Notable publications devoted to the James Bond phenomenon include 007 MAGAZINE (1979-2019), published by Graham Rye, 007 MAGAZINE & ARCHIVE Limited (www.007magazine.com); and the now defunct Goldeneye, originally published by the Ian Fleming Foundation.

During the 2000s, participants in the various websites and chat rooms devoted to Bond engaged in daily discussions comparing and assessing the films, the Bond girls, and the villains.

Contributors to the fan site commanderbond.net have been credited with discovering the plagiarism in the novel Assassin of Secrets, which was published in the US by Little, Brown and Company and then withdrawn.

== Fan-made computer game remake ==
GoldenEye: Source is a total conversion mod in development using the Source engine developed by Valve for the computer game, Half-Life 2. GoldenEye: Source is based on the award-winning Nintendo 64 video game, GoldenEye 007, featuring Bond. An alpha release was distributed on 25 December 2005 receiving more than 65,000 downloads in 2 weeks. A Beta release of GoldenEye: Source was scheduled for 25 December 2006, but was released on 26 December 2006.

In January 2007 it was awarded twice in the 2006 annual Moddb awards, a win in Editor's Choice for the Reinvention category, and was player-voted 3rd place in the overall category Mod of the year. A significant rise from the 2005 awards, which earned GoldenEye: Source 4th place in the unreleased category.

On 5 December 2007 one of the developers released an unofficial patch. This patch fixes some of the bugs there are present in the first beta version. The developer team will not support this patch, and support is only available in a topic in the GoldenEye: Source forum.

== Fan demographics ==
In 2012, the polling organization YouGov conducted a survey of US Bond fans, with a particular focus on their preferences for actors. Sean Connery led in all groups, which were categorized by age cohort, gender, and party affiliation. It found that 60% of Americans described themselves as fans and that fandom "crosses gender, party, and age lines." More Barack Obama voters (65%) called themselves fans than did Mitt Romney voters (59%). Hollywood.com analyzed Facebook mentions of the film Skyfall shortly after its release and found that among men, those aged 25 to 34 made the most frequent mentions and that mentions in the United Kingdom exceeded those in other countries. It found that 52% of the Facebook users who described themselves as Bond fans were female. Fan demographics are considered by the filmmakers and the firms seeking product placement. Smirnoff vodka, which had been featured in Bond films since Dr. No, was replaced with Finlandia vodka in Die Another Day. A Smirnoff representative said that the company had lost interest in the Bond audience, whose major demographic they saw as men aged 25 to 45, and that it was seeking younger, more social customers aged 21 to 29.

Mark O'Connell published Catching Bullets: Memoirs of a Bond Fan in 2012, describing his fandom in the context of being gay.

== Bond tourism ==
Several Bond film settings have become fan tourism destinations.

Ko Tapu found fame through the 1974 film The Man with the Golden Gun. It is now often known as James Bond Island and is toured by as many as 1,000 visitors per day.

Other fan tourism destinations include the Contra Dam in Switzerland, the Rock of Gibraltar, the Meteora monasteries, and Jamaica's Green Grotto Caves. Following Scotland's presence in Skyfall, CNN Travel named it the world's top travel destination for 2013. In 2012, Great Britain's tourism board announced an initiative encouraging Bond tourism there, with the slogan "Bond is Great Britain."

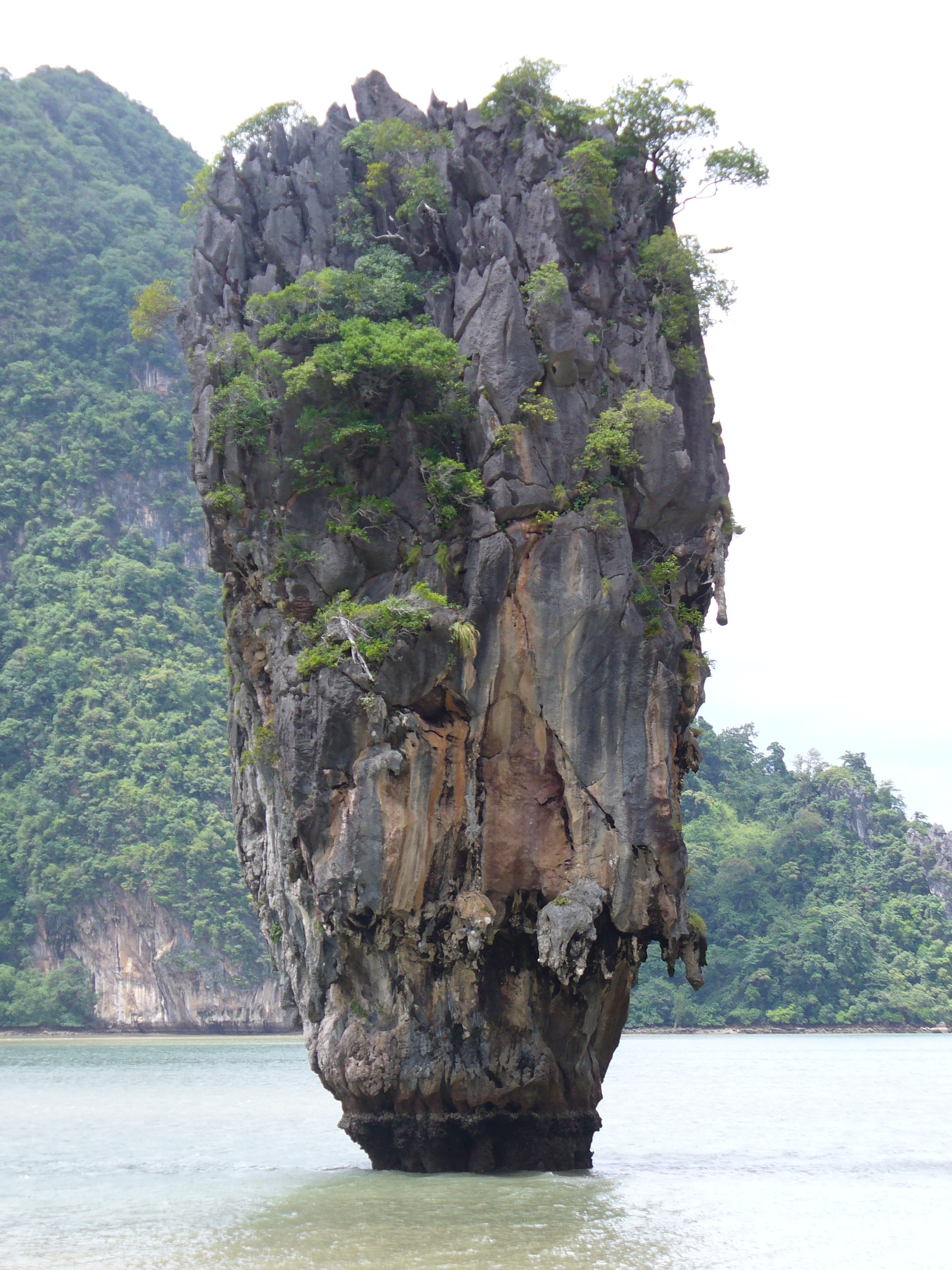
James Bond Island

Some travel agencies have organized a subdivision to create tours specifically highlighting iconic landmarks in the world of James Bond. where Fleming worked and lived, uncovering HQs of the intelligence communities, SOE, SIS, MI5 and MI6.

The Fleming Collection is a collection of art founded by Ian Fleming's grandfather, Robert. In 2008, the centenary of the author's birth, the gallery exhibited the cover art for the various editions of the James Bond books. This attracted much attention from fans. A parallel exhibition at the Imperial War Museum likewise attracted Bond buffs.

== Fan interaction ==
U.S. President John F. Kennedy was a fan of the Bond novels, naming From Russia with Love as one of his ten favorite books in a 1961 Life magazine article. Jacqueline Kennedy gave Allen Dulles a copy of the book. Dulles, then director of the CIA, and Fleming admired each other and entered into a correspondence. Dulles encouraged the CIA to develop and deploy Bond espionage gadgetry. Several authors have suggested that Kennedy's fandom, along with that of other members of the CIA, influenced his decision to launch the Bay of Pigs invasion and other means of overthrowing Fidel Castro. Historian Howard Jones wrote that the administration's early effort to overthrow Castro was unsurprising in light of JFK's fascination with the Bond mystique; Skip Willman that reading Bond influenced their expectations with regard to the Cuban situation. Garry Wills wrote that while the invasion looked "crazy" in retrospect, it "made sense to a James Bond fan."

The Rinspeed sQuba, a concept car released in 2008 that was the first car that can be driven on both land and underwater, was developed by designer and CEO Frank Rinderknecht, a James Bond fan who was directly inspired by the amphibious Lotus Esprit in the 1977 Bond film The Spy Who Loved Me.

Actor Daniel Craig's announcement as Bond met with a protest from fans who organised the website craignotbond.com and urged a boycott. The site, later renamed DanielCraigIsNotBond.com, had been visited over a million times by mid-November 2006 and collected 20,627 signatures on a petition. A portion of the fan base also protested Craig's on-screen consumption of beer rather than a martini.

== Critical assessment ==
The media historian James Chapman identifies a divide between the fans of the Bond films and those who focus on the Fleming books. He quotes oppositional views. Anthony Burgess wrote that "It is time for aficionados of the films to get back to the books and admire their quality as literature" and the authors of a fan history wrote that "We seek to reclaim Bond from the humourless Fleming pedants who view Bond as fixed, immutable, an unalterable period antiquity." Another divide is identified by Mark Duffett, who sees the books' readership as a function of the expectations they had already acquired; some approached them as romance novels and others as spy thrillers.

Stijn Reijnders discusses the phenomenon of the 'Bond pilgrimage', which he classifies as a media pilgrimage. The participants, who he describes as 'overwhelmingly white, middle-aged, heterosexual men,' visit Bond film shooting locations and recount their experiences in detail. Some contribute to Bond fan websites.

The introduction to Ian Fleming & James Bond: The Cultural Politics of 007 considers the question of whether cultural studies of Bond are only a 'glorified form of fandom' and a guilty pleasure on the part of academics, and concludes that they are not.

== See also ==
- Outline of James Bond
