= Mount Potts =

Sheep station in New Zealand

Coordinates: 43.502624°S 170.924514°E

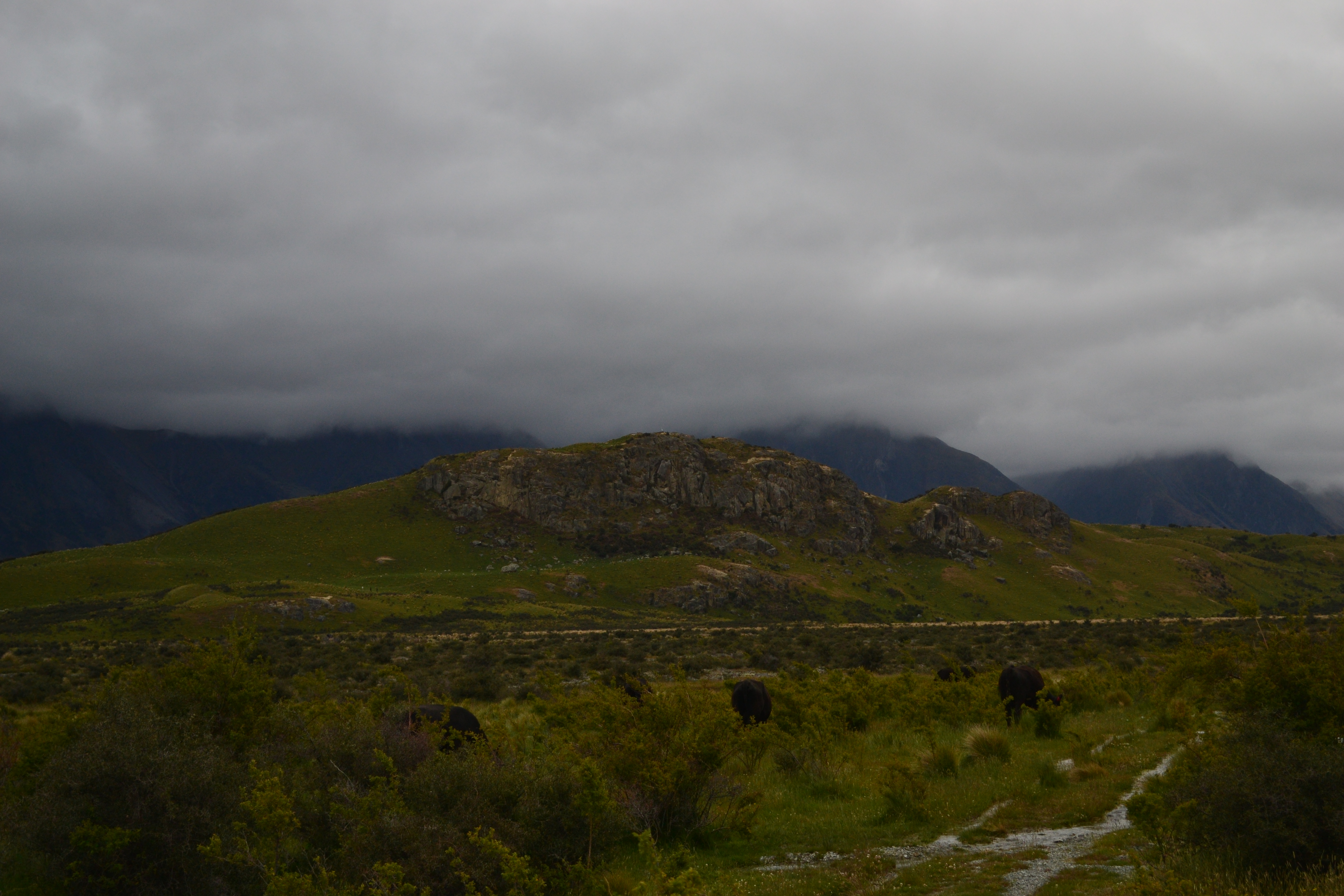
Mt. Sunday viewed from the northeast.

Mount Potts (2,184 metres) is a mountain in Canterbury, New Zealand. It is located in the Hakatere Conservation Park.

Until 2011, the area was operated as an exclusive skifield. Unlike normal resorts, there were no fixed ski tows or chairlifts. Instead, vertical transport was provided by snowcats and helicopter. The ski area covered 660 hectares and included, "steep faces, chutes, rocks to drop off, cornices, wide open powder bowls and gullies". Now, Mount Potts is a popular destination for backcountry skiing because there is easy access to the snow via the old road. Nearby Mount Sunday, the setting of Edoras in The Lord Of The Rings, is also a tourist attraction.

Mount Potts is an hour's drive from Methven, and two hours' drive from Christchurch.

== Climate ==
Climate data for Mount Potts, elevation 2,128 m (6,982 ft), (1991–2020 normals, extremes 2009–present)
Month	Jan	Feb	Mar	Apr	May	Jun	Jul	Aug	Sep	Oct	Nov	Dec	Year
Record high °C (°F)	23.8 (74.8)	20.5 (68.9)	19.1 (66.4)	17.1 (62.8)	14.0 (57.2)	11.4 (52.5)	11.8 (53.2)	11.5 (52.7)	13.6 (56.5)	14.0 (57.2)	18.3 (64.9)	19.1 (66.4)	23.8 (74.8)
Mean daily maximum °C (°F)	10.5 (50.9)	10.7 (51.3)	9.1 (48.4)	5.7 (42.3)	3.2 (37.8)	0.9 (33.6)	−0.3 (31.5)	0.1 (32.2)	2.2 (36.0)	3.8 (38.8)	5.6 (42.1)	8.3 (46.9)	5.0 (41.0)
Daily mean °C (°F)	6.6 (43.9)	7.1 (44.8)	5.5 (41.9)	2.4 (36.3)	0.2 (32.4)	−2.1 (28.2)	−3.3 (26.1)	−2.8 (27.0)	−1.2 (29.8)	0.1 (32.2)	1.9 (35.4)	4.6 (40.3)	1.6 (34.9)
Mean daily minimum °C (°F)	2.8 (37.0)	3.4 (38.1)	1.8 (35.2)	−0.9 (30.4)	−2.9 (26.8)	−5.1 (22.8)	−6.3 (20.7)	−5.8 (21.6)	−4.7 (23.5)	−3.7 (25.3)	−1.8 (28.8)	0.9 (33.6)	−1.9 (28.7)
Record low °C (°F)	−8.1 (17.4)	−7.0 (19.4)	−10.8 (12.6)	−12.6 (9.3)	−13.7 (7.3)	−13.8 (7.2)	−15.9 (3.4)	−17.4 (0.7)	−15.7 (3.7)	−16.2 (2.8)	−11.1 (12.0)	−9.6 (14.7)	−17.4 (0.7)
Source: NIWA

== See also ==
- Heliskiing
- Snowcat
- Mount Sunday
