= Tolkien tourism =

Tourism of locations associated with the J. R. R. Tolkien's "Middle earth" franchise

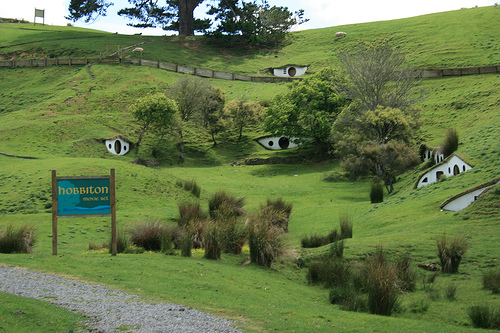
Many of the New Zealand locations where parts of Peter Jackson's Middle-earth films were shot have become tourist destinations.

Tolkien tourism consists of media pilgrimages by fans of Tolkien's fiction and Peter Jackson's The Lord of the Rings film trilogy to sites related to the book and films. In Jackson's New Zealand, it is credited as having raised annual tourism significantly.

== Origins ==
The Lord of the Rings film series by Peter Jackson, based on J. R. R. Tolkien's novel of the same name, were shot at locations throughout New Zealand. Many of these places have been preserved and altered to encourage the media pilgrimage tourism that makes up a significant portion of the country's economy. On some Lord of the Rings film location tours, tourists are provided time to indulge in cosplay, and dress as characters from the books or films.

== In New Zealand ==
New Zealand is well placed to capitalize on its scenery. Tolkien tourist attention is less geared to visiting New Zealand's national parks and more focused on scenery that was used as backdrops in Peter Jackson's films. For example, Mount Olympus is in Kahurangi National Park near Nelson in a remote corner of the South Island. Since it featured in The Fellowship of the Ring, Mount Olympus has become a spot for Tolkien tourists.

Mount Sunday, in a remote area west of the Canterbury Plains (upper reaches of the Rangitata Valley near Erewhon) served as the location of Edoras. Although no traces of the filming remain, complete day tour packages to it are available from Christchurch.

The New Zealand Film Commission, the national film promotion board, advertises that New Zealand offers a kaleidoscope of urban and rural landscapes. Tourists are invited to find film locations around New Zealand with a free "Middle Earth map." Currently New Zealand is negotiating with Peter Jackson and New Line Cinema, the films' producers, to construct a permanent Lord of the Rings museum for some of the 40,000 props and costumes now warehoused in New Zealand.

=== Economic effects ===
The annual tourist influx to New Zealand grew 40%, from 1.7 million in 2000 to 2.4 million in 2006, has been attributed in large part to The Lord of the Rings phenomenon. 6% of international visitors cited the film as a reason for travelling to the country. "You can argue that Lord of the Rings was the best unpaid advertisement that New Zealand has ever had", said Bruce Lahood, United States and Canadian regional manager for Tourism New Zealand. An article published by The New York Times contradicts Lahood, stating that New Zealand subsidized the movie trilogy with $150 million.

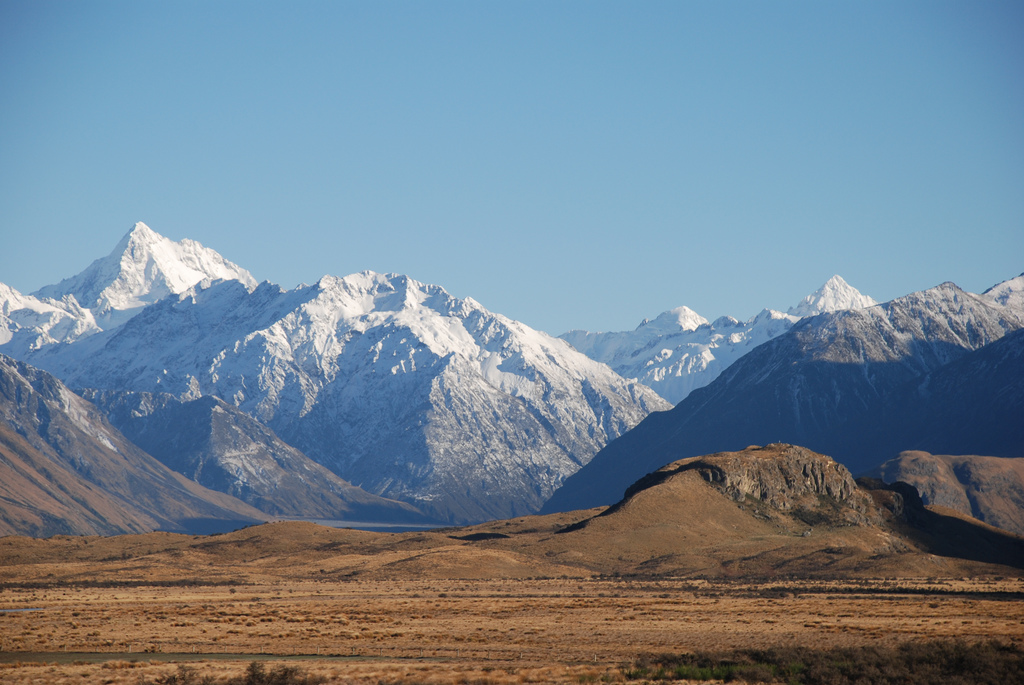
Mount Sunday was the filming location for Edoras.

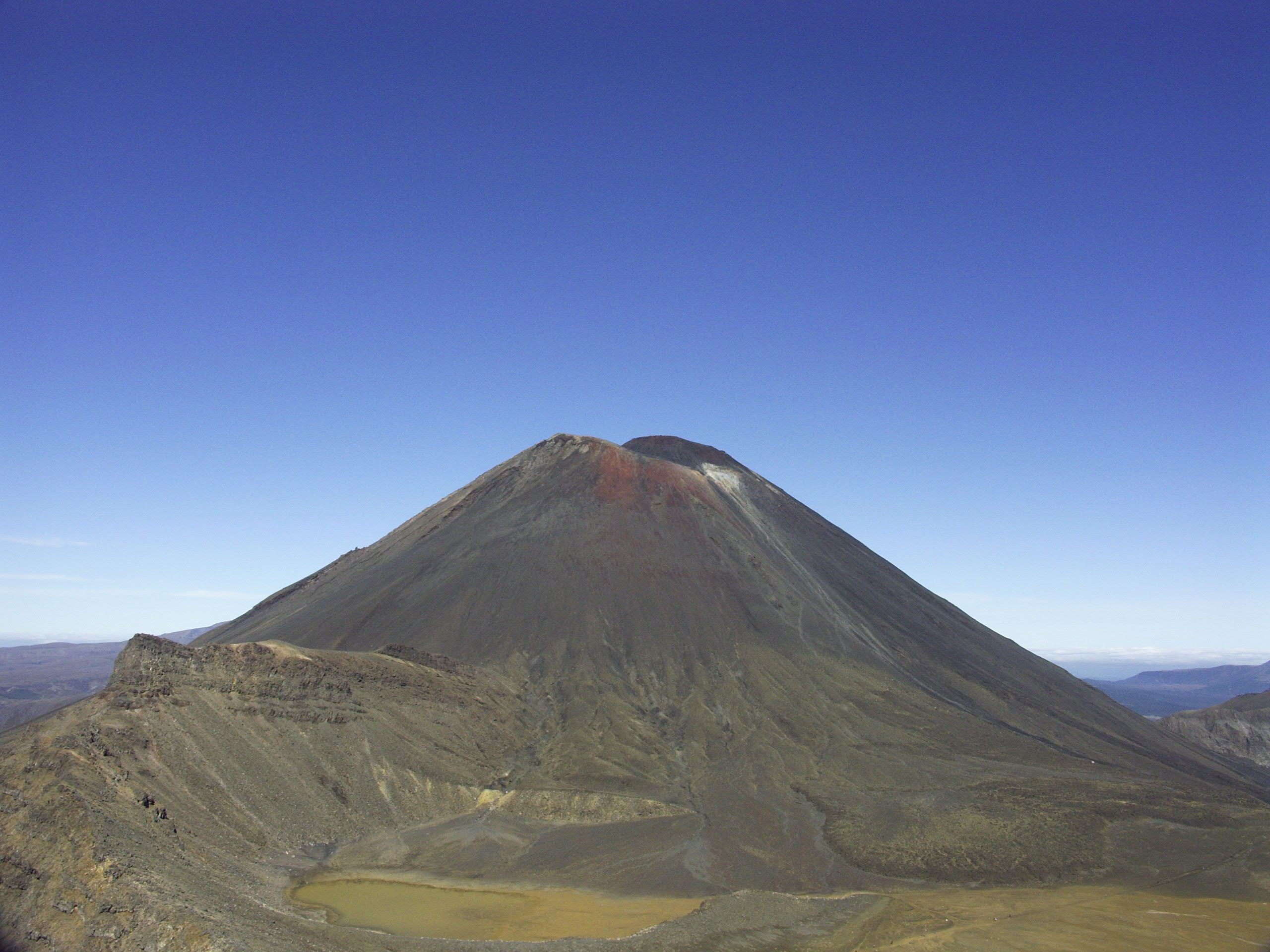
Mount Ngauruhoe served as Mount Doom in the films.

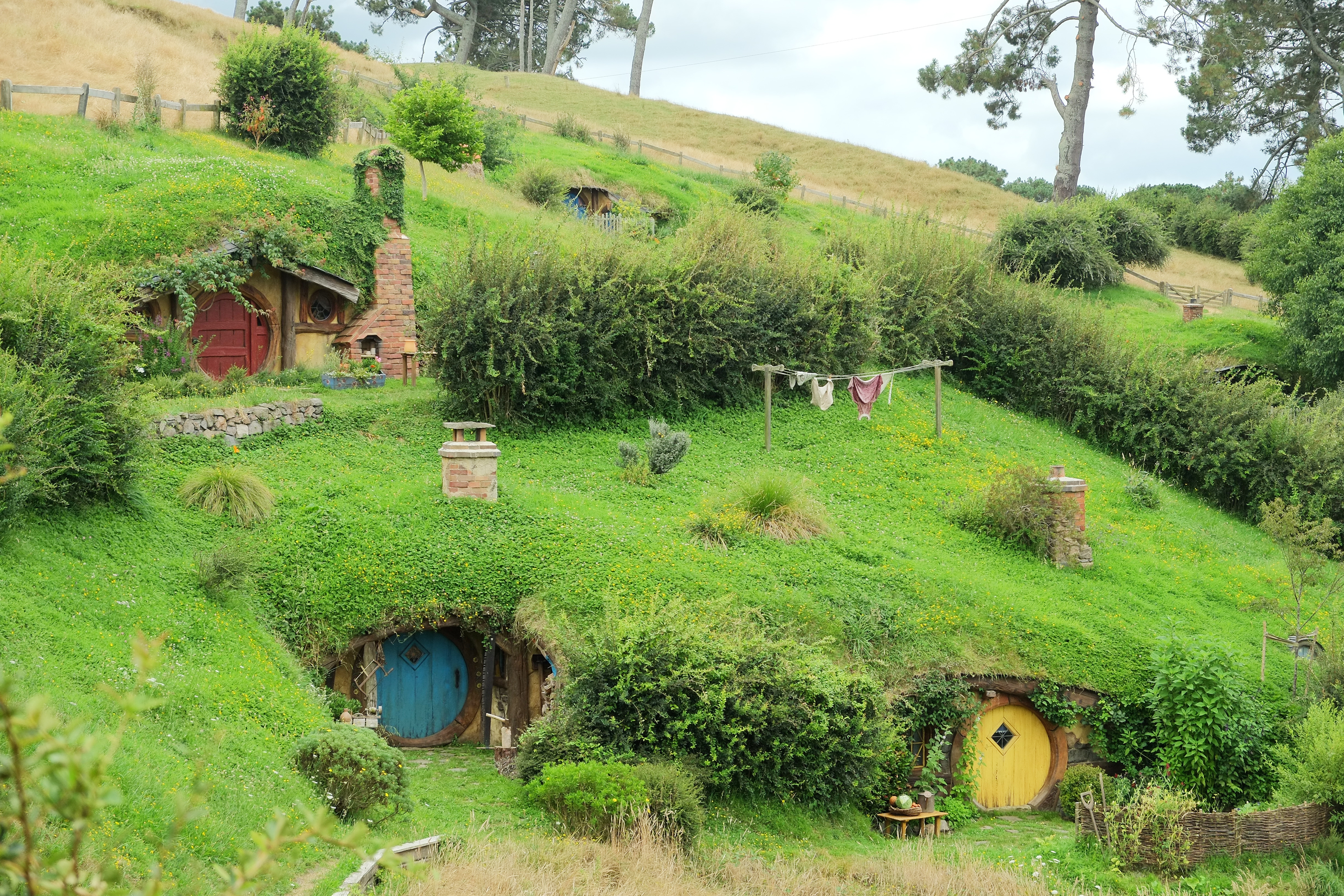
The Lord of the Rings "Hobbiton" film set was renovated and re-used for The Hobbit trilogy, and is maintained to that standard for set tours.

=== Impact ===
New Zealanders have commented on the pervasiveness of Tolkien tourism, and the presentation of New Zealand internationally in terms of the Tolkien films. It has been argued that this covers up the country's precolonial history with its indigenous Māori population and their culture. The speculative fiction writer Sascha Stronach called it "suffocating" and while pointing out Tolkien's works' English elements stating the association "a cruel echo of colonialism, a sort of soft colonialism: by making Aotearoa a proxy of England, you say Aotearoa is England".

== In other places ==
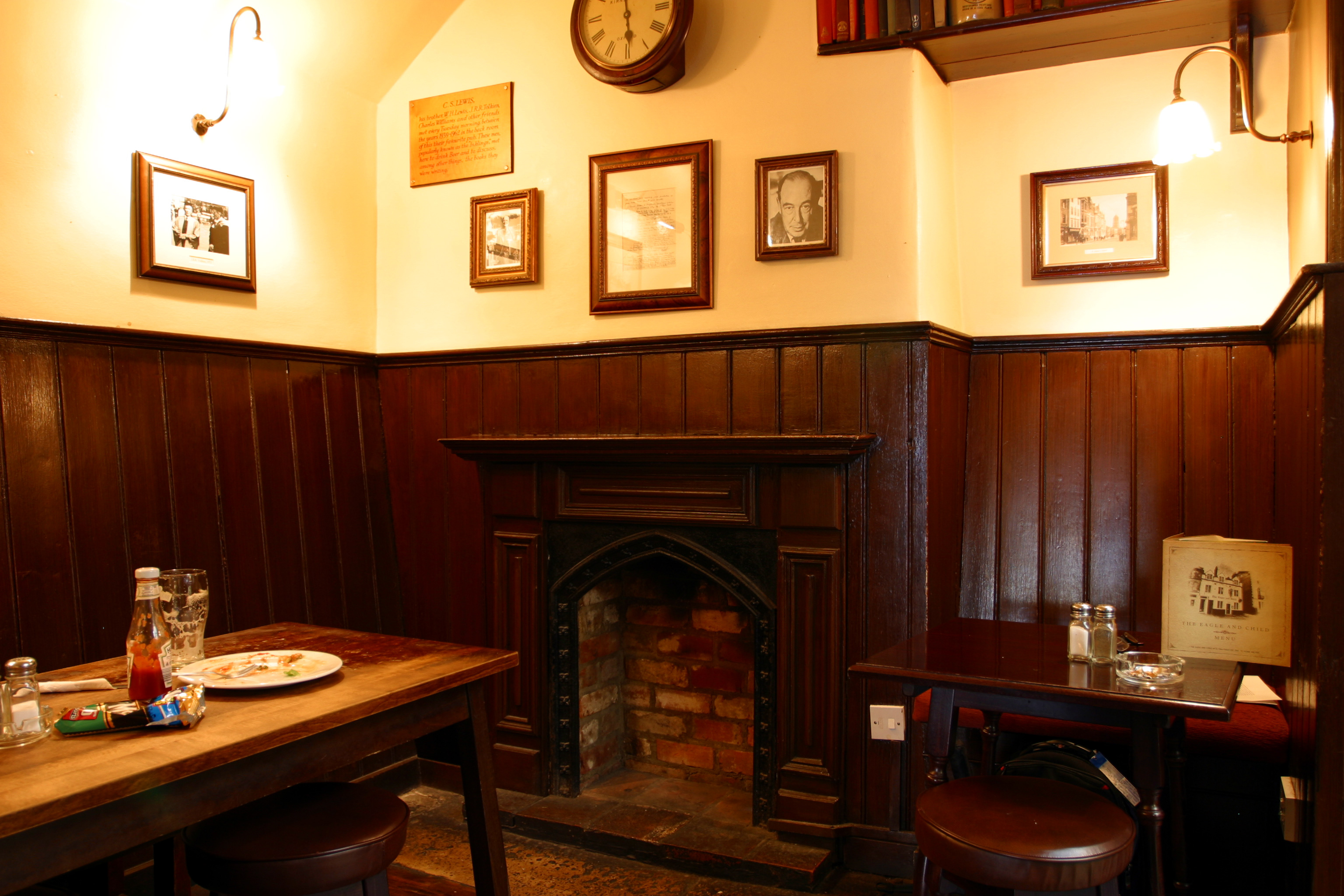
The Eagle and Child pub in Oxford contains mementos of The Inklings including Tolkien who used to meet and drink there.

Tolkien tourism has existed to a lesser extent independent from the Jackson movies, in other places associated with him. Tolkien worked for much of his career in Oxford, England. The colleges where Tolkien taught, the pubs that he and the Inklings frequented, the church he attended, and his former homes in the city all attract tourist interest. The Eagle and Child pub used to capitalise on Tolkien's former patronage in its signage and interior decoration.

== See also ==
- Impact on popular culture of the Lord of the Rings
