= Mead hall =

Residence of a lord and his retainers in medieval Germanic Europe

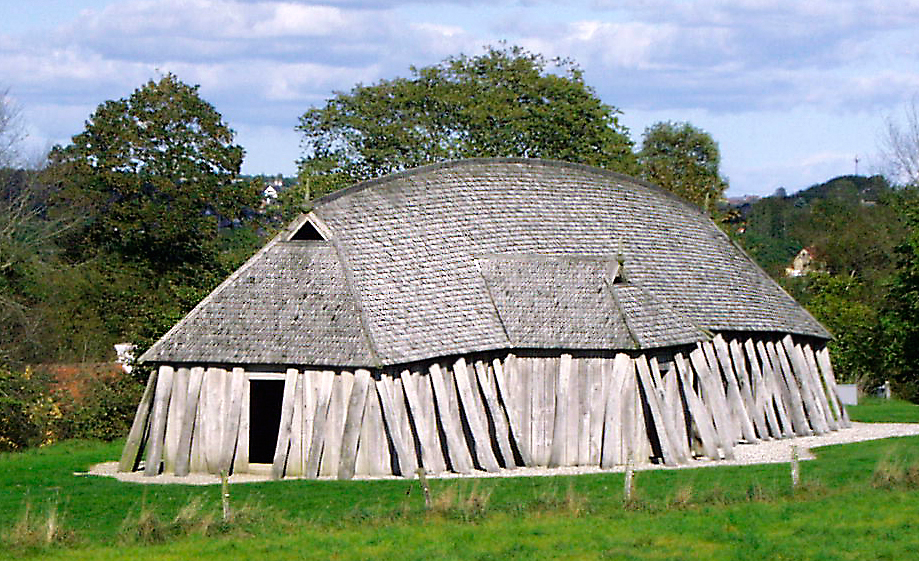
A reconstructed Viking Age longhouse (28.5 metres long) in Denmark.

Among the early Germanic peoples, a mead hall or feasting hall was a large building with a single room intended to receive guests and serve as a center of community social life. From the fifth century to the Early Middle Ages such a building was the residence of a lord or king and his retainers. These structures were also where lords could formally receive visitors and where the community would gather to socialize, allowing lords to oversee the social activity of their subjects.

== Etymology ==
The old name of such halls may have been sal/salr and thus be present in old place names such as "Uppsala". The meaning has been preserved in German Saal, Dutch zaal, Frisian seal, Icelandic salur Icelandic pronunciation: [ˈsaːlʏr̥], Swedish, Norwegian and Danish sal, Lithuanian salė, Finnish sali, Estonian saal, Izhorian saali, Hungarian szállás, French salle, Italian/Polish/Portuguese/Spanish/Serbo-Croatian sala and Russian зал (zal), (all meaning "hall" or "large room"). In Old English, sele and sæl were used. These words are etymologically related to the modern English words salon and saloon (both augmentative forms of 'sal'). The word as a whole ("mead-hall") is a direct cognate with the Sanskrit term "madhushala" which refers to a pub or tavern.

== Archaeology ==
From around the year 500 A.D. up until the Christianization of Scandinavia (by the 13th century), these large halls were vital parts of the political center. They were later superseded by medieval banquet halls.

Examples that have been excavated include:

- Northwest of Lejre, Denmark. Remains of a Viking hall complex were uncovered in 1986–88 by Tom Christensen of the Roskilde Museum. Wood from the foundation was radiocarbon-dated to circa 880. It was later found that this hall was built over an older hall which was itself dated to 680. In 2004–05, Christensen excavated a third hall located just north of the other two. This hall was built in the mid-6th century, exactly the time period of Beowulf. All three halls were about 50 meters long. Ongoing excavations have helped to establish the visual characteristics of the royal halls and their location in the landscape around Lejre, circa 500-1000.
- Gudme, Denmark. Two similar halls were excavated in 1993. Of the so-called "Gudme Kongehal" (King's hall) only the post holes were found. The larger of the two was 47 meters long and 8 meters wide. Gold items found near the site have been dated between 200 and 550. The Iron Age graveyards of Møllegårdsmarken and Brudager are close by. The halls may have been part of a regional religious and political center serving as royal feasting places with Lundeborg serving as harbor.
- West Stow, Suffolk. A village from the 5th and 6th century has been excavated, containing several halls. The largest complete hall is approximately 23 feet (7.0 meters) wide and 46 feet (14 meters) long.
- Yeavering, Northumberland. Several halls, of varying size and purpose, have been dated back to the late sixth century and seventh century. There are two main halls, which are larger than the others. Earlier buildings at this site were most likely constructed by Britons, while the later buildings were constructed by Anglo-Saxons. The largest hall is approximately 36 feet (11 meters) wide and 81 feet (25 meters) long. The halls of Yeavering are commonly interpreted to be real-life sources of inspiration behind the mead-hall Heorot from the story of Beowulf.

== Precursor ==
The mead hall developed from European longhouses:

- The unrelated Neolithic long house was introduced with the first farmers of central and western Europe around 5000 BC. Later longhouses did not come into use until more than a thousand years after the Neolithic version ceased to be used.
- Germanic cattle-farmer longhouses emerged along the southwestern North Sea coast in the third or fourth century BC and are the predecessors of the German and Dutch Fachhallenhaus or Low German house.

The possibly related medieval longhouse types of Europe of which some examples have survived are among others:

- The Scandinavian or Viking Langhus, with the variants of traditional farm house such as excavated in Vorbasse, a garrison/barracks type for warriors such as found at the Viking ring castles and the sophisticated large banquetting halls such as the mead halls.
- The southwest England variants in Dartmoor and Wales
- The northwest England type in Cumbria
- The Scottish Longhouse, "blackhouse" or taighean dubha
- The French longère or maison longue (only considering the types similar to the ones described in Dartmoor or Cumbria, possibly of Norman origin)

== Legends and history ==
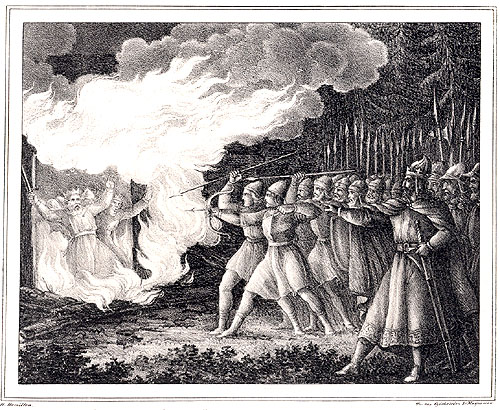
Ingjald burning his subordinate kings alive in his new feasting hall.

There are several accounts of large feasting halls constructed for important feasts when Scandinavian royalty was invited. According to a legend recorded by Snorri Sturluson, in the Heimskringla, the late 9th century Värmlandish chieftain Áki invited both the Norwegian king Harald Fairhair and the Swedish king Eric Eymundsson, but had the Norwegian king stay in the newly constructed and sumptuous one, because he was the youngest one of the kings and the one who had the greatest prospects. The older Swedish king, on the other hand, had to stay in the old feasting hall. The Swedish king was so humiliated that he killed Áki.

The construction of new feasting halls could also be the preparation for treacherous murders of royalty. In the Ynglinga saga part of the Heimskringla, Snorri relates how, in the 8th century, the legendary Swedish king Ingjald constructed a large feasting hall solely for the purpose of burning all his subordinate petty kings late at night when they were asleep. According to Yngvars saga víðförla, the same ruse was done by the Swedish king Eric the Victorious and the Norwegian ruler Sigurd Jarl, when they murdered Áki, a rebellious Swedish subking, at Gamla Uppsala, in the late 10th century.

It is also possible that large halls may have served as places of protection. It is speculated that, under Alfred the Great's rule, fines protecting property belonging to the king may have also applied to feasting halls. These fines prevented fighting inside of the building. On the other hand - a Danish leader in Beowulf, Shield Sheafson, was described as "a wrecker of mead benches".

== Mythology ==
From at least the tenth century onwards in Norse mythology, there are numerous examples of halls where the dead may arrive. The best known example is Valhalla, the hall where Odin receives half of the dead lost in battle. Freyja, in turn, receives the other half at Sessrúmnir.

== In fiction ==
In fiction, mead halls usually appear in works that take place during the Middle Ages.

- In J. R. R. Tolkien's fictional universe of Middle-earth, Meduseld (meaning "mead hall" in Old English) was the great Golden Hall built in Rohan. Meduseld was a large hall with a straw roof, which made it appear as if it were made out of gold when seen from far off. Its walls were richly decorated with tapestries depicting the history and legends of the Rohirrim, and it served as a house for the King and his kin, a meeting hall for the King and his advisors, and a gathering hall. Also, a mead hall is the central location of Beorn's home grounds where he serves mead and food to Bilbo Baggins, the Dwarves and Gandalf in The Hobbit.
- In The Elder Scrolls by Bethesda Softworks, a race called the Nords, who resemble the Germanic peoples, build large mead halls, such as Jorrvaskr found in The Elder Scrolls V: Skyrim.
- In Shrek the Third, Prince Charming visits a mead hall in order to gather some fairytale villains in order to do the "dirty work" with him in the film.
- The film How to Train Your Dragon has a brief scene with a mead hall.
- The film Beowulf mostly takes place in a mead hall.
- In the Norwegian comedy television series Norsemen (Vikingane in Norwegian), celebrations are frequently held in the village's mead hall.

== See also ==
- Great hall
- Moot hall
