= Potts River =

Coordinates: 43°35′S 170°55′E

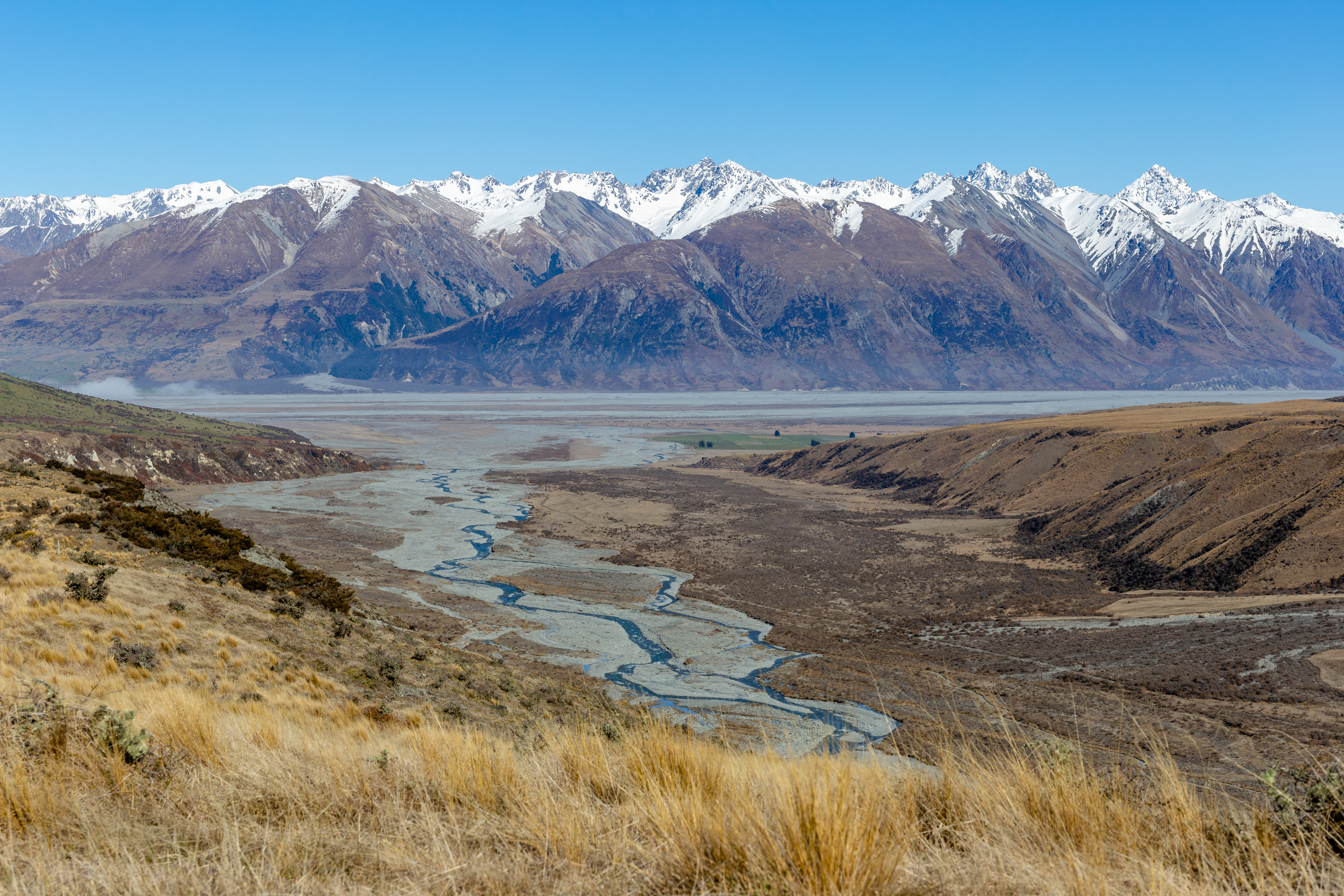

Location
- Country: New Zealand

Physical characteristics
- Source
  - location: Arrowsmith Range
- Mouth
  - location: Rangitata River
- Length: 36 km (22 mi)

The Potts River is a river of the Canterbury region of New Zealand's South Island. It flows generally south from the southern end of the Arrowsmith Range through a steep-sided valley between the Potts Range to the west and the Big Hill Range to the east.

At the end of these ranges the river veers southwest, meeting the upper reaches of the Rangitata River 5 kilometres (3 mi) north of Mesopotamia Station.

== See also ==
- List of rivers of New Zealand
