= Rohan, Middle-earth =

Fictional location in Middle-earth

Rohan
- Middle-earth location
- Artist's impression of the flag of Rohan (Note: Return of the King, Book VI Ch. 4, The Field of Cormallen: "white on green, a great horse running free")
- First appearance: The Two Towers

In-universe information
- Other names: the Riddermark, Calenardhon, the Mark
- Type: Adopted home of the Rohirrim
- Ruled by: Kings of Rohan
- Location: North-west Middle-earth
- Locations: Edoras, Dunharrow, Helm's Deep
- Lifespan: Founded T.A. 2510
- Founder: Eorl the Young
- Capital: Aldburg, then Edoras

Rohan is a fictional kingdom of Men in J. R. R. Tolkien's fantasy setting of Middle-earth. Known for its horsemen, the Rohirrim, Rohan provides its ally Gondor with cavalry. Its territory is mainly grassland. The Rohirrim call their land the Mark or the Riddermark, names recalling that of the historical kingdom of Mercia, the region of Western England where Tolkien lived.

Within the plot of The Lord of the Rings, Rohan plays a critical role in the action—first against the wizard Saruman in the Battle of the Hornburg, then in the climactic Battle of the Pelennor Fields. There, Théoden leads the Rohirrim to victory against the forces of Mordor; he is killed when his horse falls, but his niece Éowyn kills the leader of the Ringwraiths.

Tolkien grounded Rohan in elements inspired by Anglo-Saxon tradition, poetry, and linguistics, specifically in its Mercian dialect, in everything but its use of horses. Tolkien used Old English for the kingdom's language and names, pretending that this was in translation of Rohirric. Meduseld, the hall of King Théoden, is modelled on Heorot, the great hall in Beowulf.

== Etymology ==
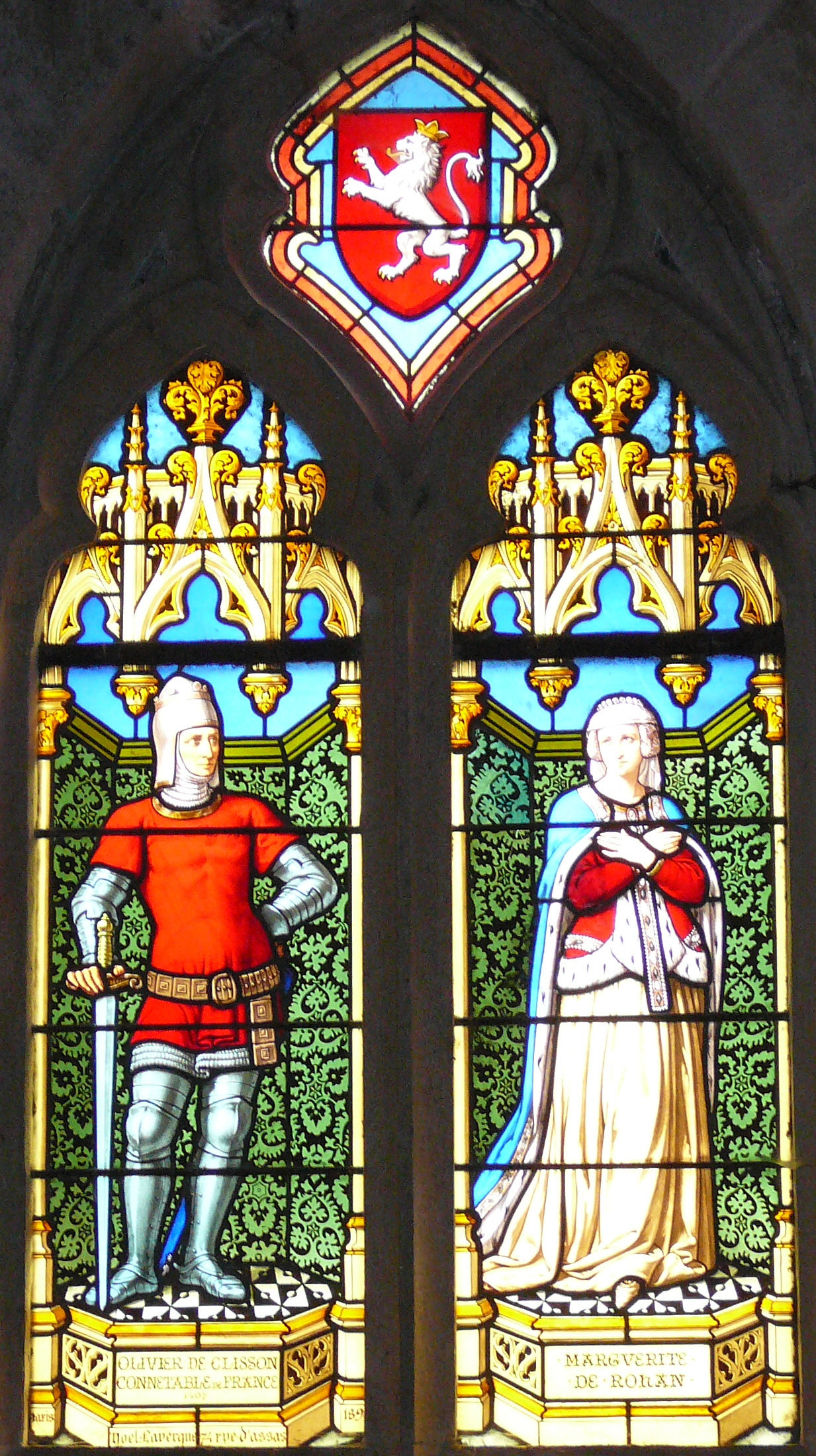
Tolkien stated that there was no link between Rohan and the noble family of Brittany, though he borrowed the name. (Note: Carpenter 2023, #297 to Mr Rang, August 1967) Stained-glass window depicting Marguerite de Rohan (c. 1330–1406)

Tolkien's own account, in an unsent letter, gives both the fictional and the actual etymologies of Rohan:

Rohan is stated (III 391, 394) to be a later softened form of Rochand. It is derived from Elvish *rokkō ‘swift horse for riding’ (Q[uenya] rocco, S[indarin] roch) + a suffix frequent in names of lands [e.g. Beleriand, Ossiriand]. ... Rohan is a famous name, from Brittany, borne by an ancient proud and powerful family. I was aware of this, and liked its shape; but I had also (long before) invented the Elvish horse-word, and saw how Rohan could be accommodated to the linguistic situation as a late Sindarin name of the Mark (previously called Calenarðon 'the (great) green region') after its occupation by horsemen. Nothing in the history of Brittany will throw any light on the Éorlingas. ...

== Geography ==
In Tolkien's Middle-earth, Rohan is an inland realm. Its countryside is described as a land of pastures and lush tall grassland which is frequently windswept. The meadows contain "many hidden pools, and broad acres of sedge waving above wet and treacherous bogs" (Note: Two Towers, Book III, Chapter 5 "The White Rider") that water the grasses. The cartographer Karen Wynn Fonstad calculated Rohan to be 52,763 square miles (136,656 km^{2}) in area (slightly larger than England).

=== Borders ===
Rohan is bordered to the north by the Fangorn forest, home to the Ents (tree-giants) (Note: Old English ent meant "giant", as in the phrase orþanc enta geweorc, "cunning work of giants".) led by Treebeard, and by the great river Anduin, called Langflood by the Rohirrim. To the northeast are the walls of Emyn Muil. After the War of the Ring, the kingdom is extended northwards over the Limlight to the borders of Lothlórien. (Note: Peoples, p. 273, "The making of Appendix A") (Note: Unfinished Tales, "Cirion and Eorl and the Friendship of Gondor and Rohan", (ii) The Ride of Eorl) To the east are the mouths of the River Entwash, and the Mering Stream, which separated Rohan from the Gondorian province of Anórien, known to the Rohirrim as Sunlending. To the south lie the White Mountains (Ered Nimrais). To the west are the rivers Adorn and Isen, where Rohan borders the land of the Dunlendings. To the northwest, just under the southern end of the Misty Mountains, lies the walled circle of Isengard around the ancient tower of Orthanc; at the time of the War of the Ring, it had been taken over by the evil wizard Saruman. The area of the western border where the Misty Mountains and the White Mountains drew near to each other is known as the Gap of Rohan.

=== Capital ===
The capital of Rohan is the fortified town of Edoras, on a hill in a valley of the White Mountains. (Note: Two Towers, book III ch. 6 "The King of the Golden Hall") "Edoras" is Old English for "enclosures". The town of Edoras was built by Rohan's second King, Brego son of Eorl the Young. The hill on which Edoras is built stands in the mouth of the valley of Harrowdale. The river Snowbourn flows past the town on its way east towards the Entwash. The town is protected by a high wall of timber.

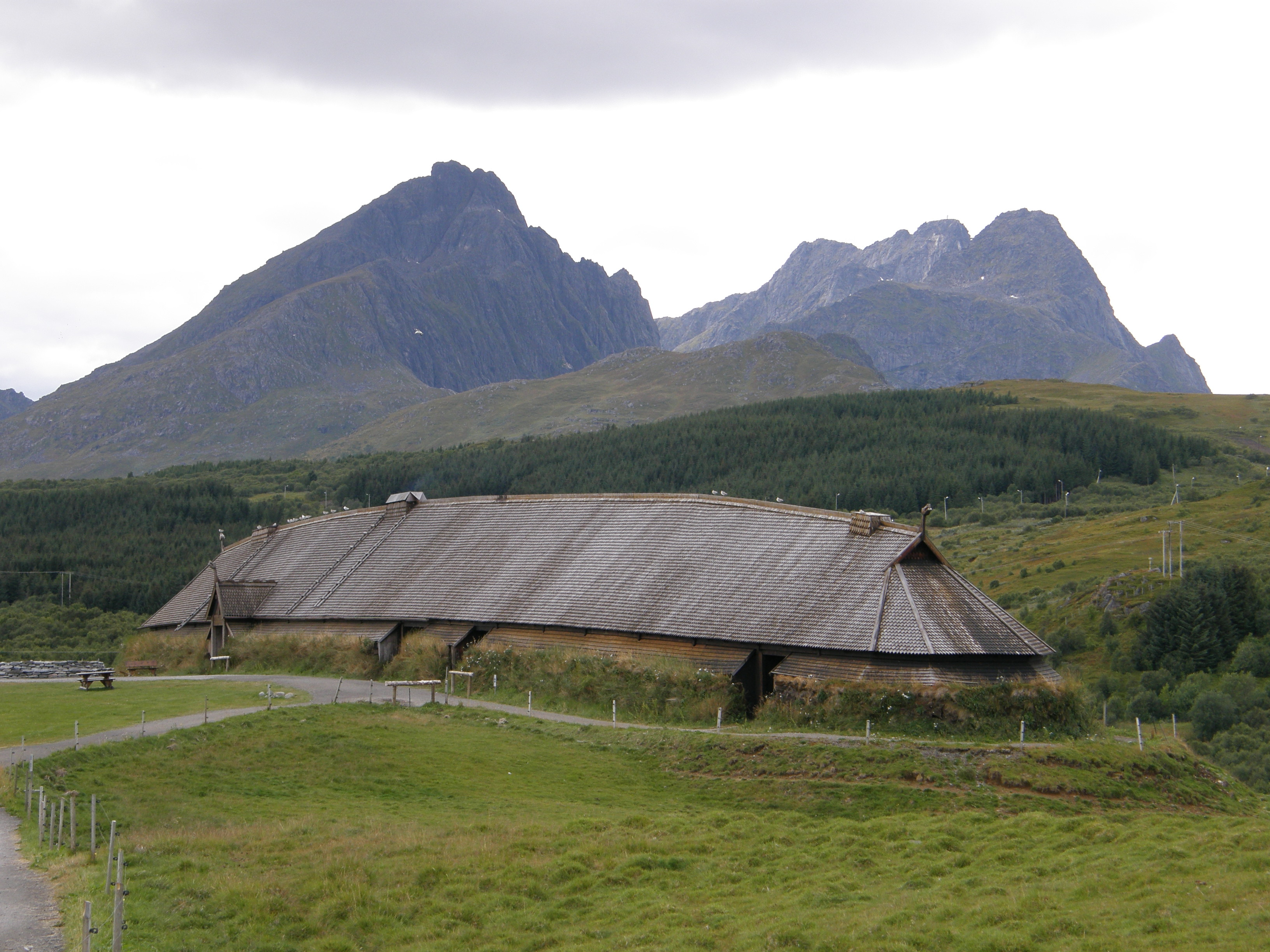
Mead hall at Borg, Norway

Meduseld, the Golden Hall of the Kings of Rohan, is in the centre of the town at the top of the hill. "Meduseld", Old English for "mead hall", is meant to be a translation of an unknown Rohirric word with the same meaning. Meduseld is based on the mead hall Heorot in Beowulf; it is a large hall with a thatched roof that appears golden from far off. The walls are richly decorated with tapestries depicting the history and legends of the Rohirrim, and it serves as a house for the King and his kin, a meeting hall for the King and his advisors, and a gathering hall for ceremonies and festivities. It is at Meduseld that Aragorn, Gimli, Legolas, and Gandalf meet with King Théoden. Legolas describes Meduseld in a line that directly translates a line of Beowulf, "The light of it shines far over the land", representing líxte se léoma ofer landa fela. The hall is anachronistically described as having louvres to remove the smoke, derived from William Morris's 1889 The House of the Wolfings.

=== Other settlements ===
Upstream from Edoras, deeper into Harrowdale, are the hamlets of Upbourn and Underharrow. At the head of Dunharrow (from Old English Dûnhaerg, "the heathen fane on the hillside") is a refuge, Firienfeld, in the White Mountains. (Note: Two Towers, Book III, Chapter 5 "The Muster of Rohan") Aldburg, capital of the Eastfold, is the original settlement of Eorl the Young. The Hornburg, a major fortress guarding the western region, is in Helm's Deep, a valley in the White Mountains. (Note: Two Towers, Book III, Chapter 7 "Helm's Deep")

=== Regions ===
The kingdom of Rohan, also called the Mark, is primarily divided into two regions, the East-mark and the West-mark. They are each led by a marshal of the kingdom. Rohan's capital, Edoras, lies in a small but populous region in the centre south of the kingdom, the Folde. (Note: Nomenclature, p. 771) In an earlier concept, Rohan's capital region was called the King's Lands, of which the Folde was a sub-region to the south-east of Edoras. (Note: Unfinished Tales, p. 367, part 3, ch. V. Appendix (i)) North of the Folde, the boundary between the East-mark and West-mark runs along the Snowbourn River and the Entwash. (Note: Unfinished Tales, p. 367, part 3, ch. V. Appendix (i), footnote) Most of the rest of Rohan's population is spread along the foothills of the White Mountains in both directions from the Folde. In the West-mark the Westfold extends along the mountains to Helm's Deep (the defensive centre of Westfold) and to the Gap of Rohan. Beyond the Gap of Rohan lies the West Marches, the kingdom's far west borderland. The Eastfold extends along the White Mountains in the opposite direction (and was thus a part of the East-mark). It is bound by the Entwash to the north. Its eastern borderland is called the Fenmarch; beyond this lies the Kingdom of Gondor. (Note: Two Towers, book III, ch. 8 "Road to Isengard")

The centre of Rohan is a large plain, divided by the Entwash into the East Emnet and the West Emnet. (Note: Nomenclature, pp. 769, 778) These regions fell respectively into the East-mark and the West-mark. The northernmost region of Rohan, and the least populous, is the Wold. The Field of Celebrant (named for a synonym of the River Silverlode), even further north, is added to Rohan after the War of the Ring. (Note: Peoples, p. 273, part 1, ch. IX (iii))

== Culture ==
=== People ===
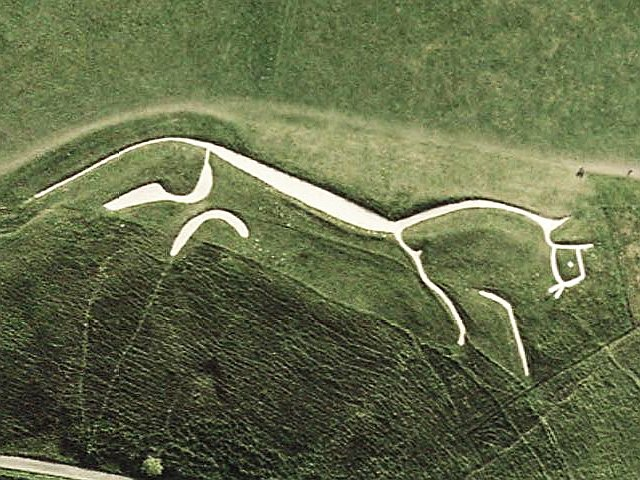
The Uffington White Horse, from where according to the Tolkien scholar Tom Shippey the emblem of the House of Éorl – a "white horse upon green" – is derived.

The Rohirrim are distantly related to the Dúnedain of Gondor, having descended from the same place. (Note: Unfinished Tales, "Cirion and Eorl (i) The Northmen and the Wainriders") Unlike the inhabitants of Gondor, who are portrayed as enlightened and highly civilized, the Rohirrim are shown as being at a lower level of enlightenment.

The names and many details of Rohirric culture are derived from Germanic cultures, particularly that of the Anglo-Saxons and their Old English language, towards which Tolkien felt a strong affinity. Anglo-Saxon England was defeated by the cavalry of the Normans at the Battle of Hastings, and some Tolkien scholars have suggested that the Rohirrim are Tolkien's wishful version of an Anglo-Saxon society that retained a "rider culture", and would have been able to resist such an invasion. The Tolkien scholar Tom Shippey notes that Tolkien derived the emblem of the House of Éorl, a "white horse upon green", from the Uffington White Horse carved into the grass of the chalk downs in England.

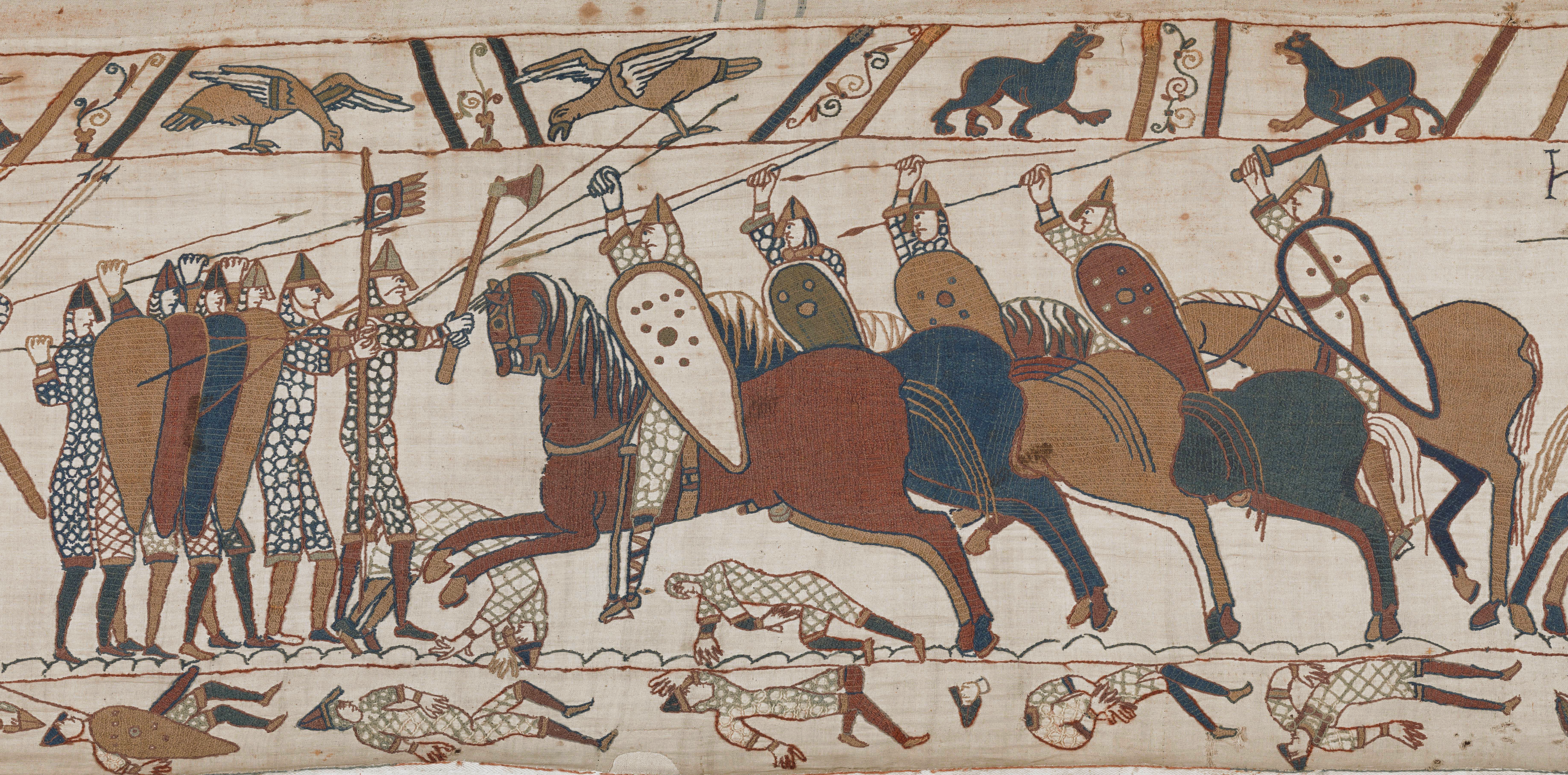
Tolkien stated that the styles of the Bayeux Tapestry, showing horsemen fighting with spears and swords, and armoured with mail shirts and iron helmets, fitted the Rohirrim "well enough". (Note: Carpenter 2023, No. 211 to Rhona Beare, 14 October 1958)

While Tolkien represents the Rohirrim with Anglo-Saxon culture and language, their ancestors are given Gothic attributes. The names of Rhovanion's royal family (ancestors to the Rohirrim (Note: Tolkien 1980, p. 311)) include such names as Vidugavia, Vidumavi and Vinitharya, which are of Gothic origin. Vidugavia specifically has been seen as a synonym for Vitiges, king of the Ostrogoths in Italy from 536 to 540. Tolkien saw this as a parallel with the real-world relationship between Old English and Gothic.

In response to a query about clothing styles in Middle-earth, Tolkien wrote:

The Rohirrim were not "medieval", in our sense. The styles of the Bayeux Tapestry (made in England) fit them well enough, if one remembers that the kind of tennis-nets [the] soldiers seem to have on are only a clumsy conventional sign for chainmail of small rings.

=== Horses and warfare ===
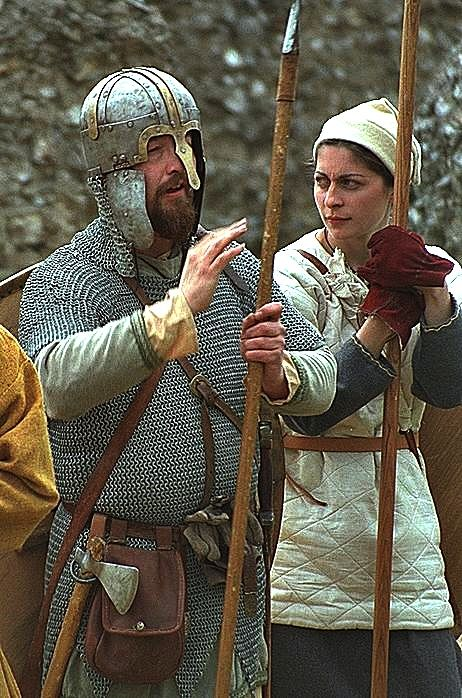
Anglo-Saxon arms and chainmail armour

The armies of Rohan were largely horsemen. The basic tactical unit was the éored, Old English for "a unit of cavalry, a troop", which at the time of the War of the Ring had a nominal strength of 120 riders. (Note: Unfinished Tales, p. 326, n. 26)

In time of war, every able man was obliged to join the Muster of Rohan. Rohan was bound by the Oath of Éorl to help Gondor in times of peril, and the latter asked for their aid through the giving of the Red Arrow. This has a historical antecedent in the Old English poem Elene, in which Constantine the Great summoned an army of mounted Visigoths to his aid against the Huns by sending an arrow as a "token of war". Gondor could also call the Rohirrim in need by lighting the warning beacons of Gondor, seven signal fires along the White Mountains from Minas Tirith to the Rohan border: Amon Dîn, Eilenach, Nardol, Erelas, Min-Rimmon, Calenhad and Halifirien.

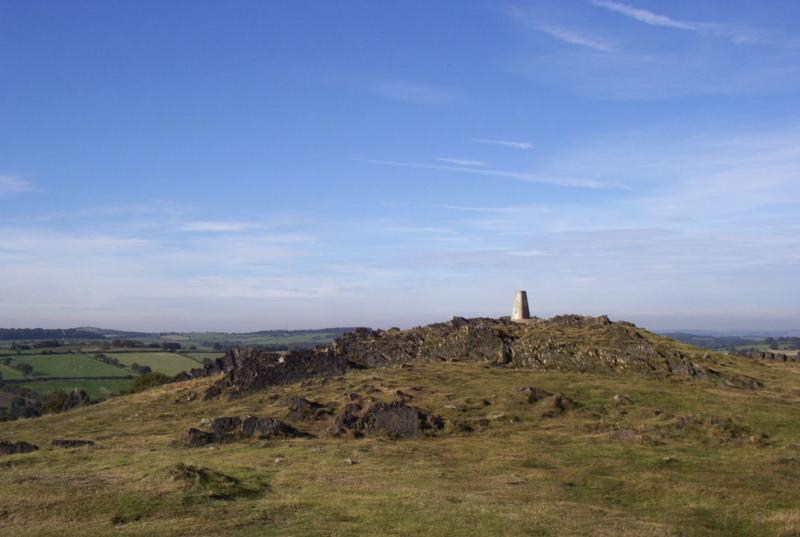
Signal beacons like those between Gondor and Rohan were once used in England, as at Beacon Hill, Leicestershire.

At the start of the War of the Ring a Full Muster would have been over 12,000 riders. (Note: Unfinished Tales, p. 315: "a Full Muster would probably have produced many more than twelve thousand riders") Among the horses of the Rohirrim were the famed mearas, the noblest and fastest horses that ever roamed Arda. It was because of the close affiliation with horses, both in war and peace, that they received their name. (Note: Unfinished Tales, p. 307, part 3 ch. 2(iii))

=== Language ===
Tolkien generally called the language simply "the language of Rohan" or "of the Rohirrim". The adjectival form "Rohirric" is common; Tolkien once also used "Rohanese". Like many languages of Men, it is akin to Adûnaic, the language of Númenóreans, and therefore to the Westron or Common Speech.

Tolkien invented parts of Middle-earth to resolve the linguistic puzzle he had accidentally created by using different European languages for those of peoples in his legendarium, pretending that he had translated the Middle-earth languages. (Note: Letters, #144, to Naomi Mitchison, 25 April 1954)

The Rohirrim called their homeland the Riddermark (or simply the Mark), meaning, according to the Index to The Lord of the Rings, "land of the knights". (Note: Return of the King, Index) The term is based on Old English ridda (genitive plural riddena), "horseman, mounted soldier", and mearc, "border, territory". They call themselves the Éorlingas, the sons of Éorl. Tolkien rendered the language of the Riders of Rohan, Rohirric, as the Mercian dialect of Old English. Even words and phrases that were printed in modern English showed a strong Old English influence. (Note: Return of the King, Appendix F, On Translation) This solution occurred to Tolkien when he was searching for an explanation of the Eddaic names of the dwarves already published in The Hobbit. Tolkien, a philologist, with a special interest in Germanic languages, pretended that the names and phrases of Old English were translated from Rohirric, just as the English used in The Shire was supposedly translated from Middle-earth's Westron or Common Speech. Examples include éored and mearas. The Riders' names for the cunningly-built tower of Isengard, Orthanc, and for the Ents, the tree-giants of Fangorn forest, are similarly Old English, both being found in the phrase orþanc enta geweorc, "cunning work of giants" in the poem The Ruin, though Shippey suggests that Tolkien may have chosen to read the phrase also as "Orthanc, the Ent's fortress".

In The Two Towers, chapter 6, the Riders of Rohan are introduced before they are seen, by Aragorn, who chants in the language of the Rohirrim words "in a slow tongue unknown to the Elf and the Dwarf", a lai that Legolas senses "is laden with the sadness of Mortal Men". The song is called the Lament of the Rohirrim. To achieve a resonant sense of the lost past, the now-legendary time of a peaceful alliance of the Horse-lords with the realm of Gondor, Tolkien adapted the short Ubi sunt ("Where are they?") passage of the Old English poem The Wanderer.

Tolkien adapted the Ubi sunt passage of the Old English poem The Wanderer to create a song of Rohan.
The Wanderer 92–96	The Wanderer in modern English	Lament of the Rohirrim by J. R. R. Tolkien
Hwær cwom mearg? Hwær cwom mago? Hwær cwom maþþumgyfa? Hwær cwom symbla gesetu? Hwær sindon seledreamas? Eala beorht bune! Eala byrnwiga! Eala þeodnes þrym! Hu seo þrag gewat, genap under nihthelm, swa heo no wære.	Where is the horse? where the rider? Where the giver of treasure? Where are the seats at the feast? Where are the revels in the hall? Alas for the bright cup! Alas for the mailed warrior! Alas for the splendour of the prince! How that time has passed away, dark under the cover of night, as if it had never been.	Where now the horse and the rider? Where is the horn that was blowing? Where is the helm and the hauberk, and the bright hair flowing? Where is the hand on the harp-string, and the red fire glowing? Where is the spring and the harvest and the tall corn growing? They have passed like rain on the mountain, like a wind in the meadow; The days have gone down in the West behind the hills into shadow. Who shall gather the smoke of the dead wood burning? Or behold the flowing years from the Sea returning?

"Thus spoke a forgotten poet long ago in Rohan, recalling how tall and fair was Eorl the Young, who rode down out of the North," Aragorn explains, after singing the Lament.

== History ==
=== Early history ===
In the 13th century of the Third Age, the Kings of Gondor made close alliances with the Northmen of Rhovanion, a people said in The Lord of the Rings to be akin to the Three Houses of Men (later the Dúnedain) from the First Age. In the 21st century, a remnant tribe of such Northmen, the Éothéod, moved from the valleys of Anduin to the northwest of Mirkwood, disputing with the Dwarves over the treasure-hoard of Scatha the dragon. (Note: Return of the King, Appendix A, II The House of Éorl)

In 2509, Cirion the Steward of Gondor summoned the Éothéod to help repel an invasion of Men from Rhûn and Orcs from Mordor. Eorl the Young, lord of the Éothéod, answered the summons, arriving unexpected at a decisive battle on the Field of Celebrant, routing the orc army. As a reward, Éorl was given the Gondorian province of Calenardhon (except for Isengard).

=== Kingdom of Rohan ===
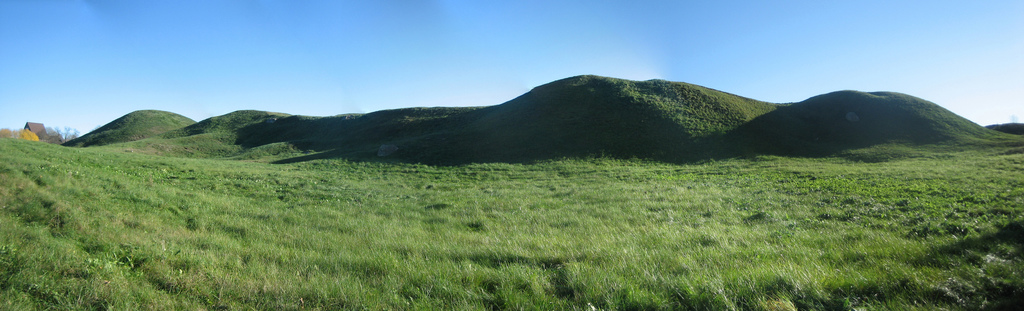
Line of Viking royal grave mounds at Gamla Uppsala, like those at Edoras

Eorl the Young founded the Kingdom of Rohan in the former Calenardhon; the royal family was known as the House of Eorl. The first line of kings lasted for 249 years, until the ninth king Helm Hammerhand died. His sons had been killed earlier, and his nephew Fréaláf Hildeson began the second line of kings, which lasted until the end of the Third Age. The two lines of kings are buried in two lines of grave mounds below the royal hall at Edoras, like those at Gamla Uppsala in Sweden, or Sutton Hoo in England.

In 2758, Rohan was invaded by Dunlendings under Wulf, son of Freca, of mixed Dunland and Rohan blood. The King, Helm Hammerhand, took refuge in the Hornburg until help from Gondor and Dunharrow arrived a year later. Soon after this Saruman took over Isengard, and was welcomed as an ally.

=== War of the Ring ===
Saruman used his influence through the traitor Grima Wormtongue to weaken Théoden. Saruman then launched an invasion of Rohan, with victory in early battles at the Fords of Isen, killing Théoden's son, Théodred. (Note: Return of the King, Appendix B "The Great years") Saruman was defeated at the Battle of the Hornburg, where the tree-like Huorns came from the forest of Fangorn to help the Rohirrim.

Théoden then rode with his army to Minas Tirith, helping to break its siege in the Battle of the Pelennor Fields and killing the leader of the Haradrim, but was killed when his horse fell. He was succeeded by his nephew Éomer. His niece Éowyn and the hobbit Merry Brandybuck killed the Lord of the Nazgûl. (Note: Return of the King, Siege of Gondor)

Éomer rode with the armies of Gondor to the Black Gate of Mordor and took part in the Battle of the Morannon against the forces of Sauron. At this time, the destruction of the Ruling Ring in Mount Doom ended the battle and the war. (Note: Return of the King, "The Black Gate Opens", and "The Field of Cormallen") Éowyn married Faramir, Prince of Ithilien. (Note: Return of the King, "The Steward and the King")

== Analysis ==
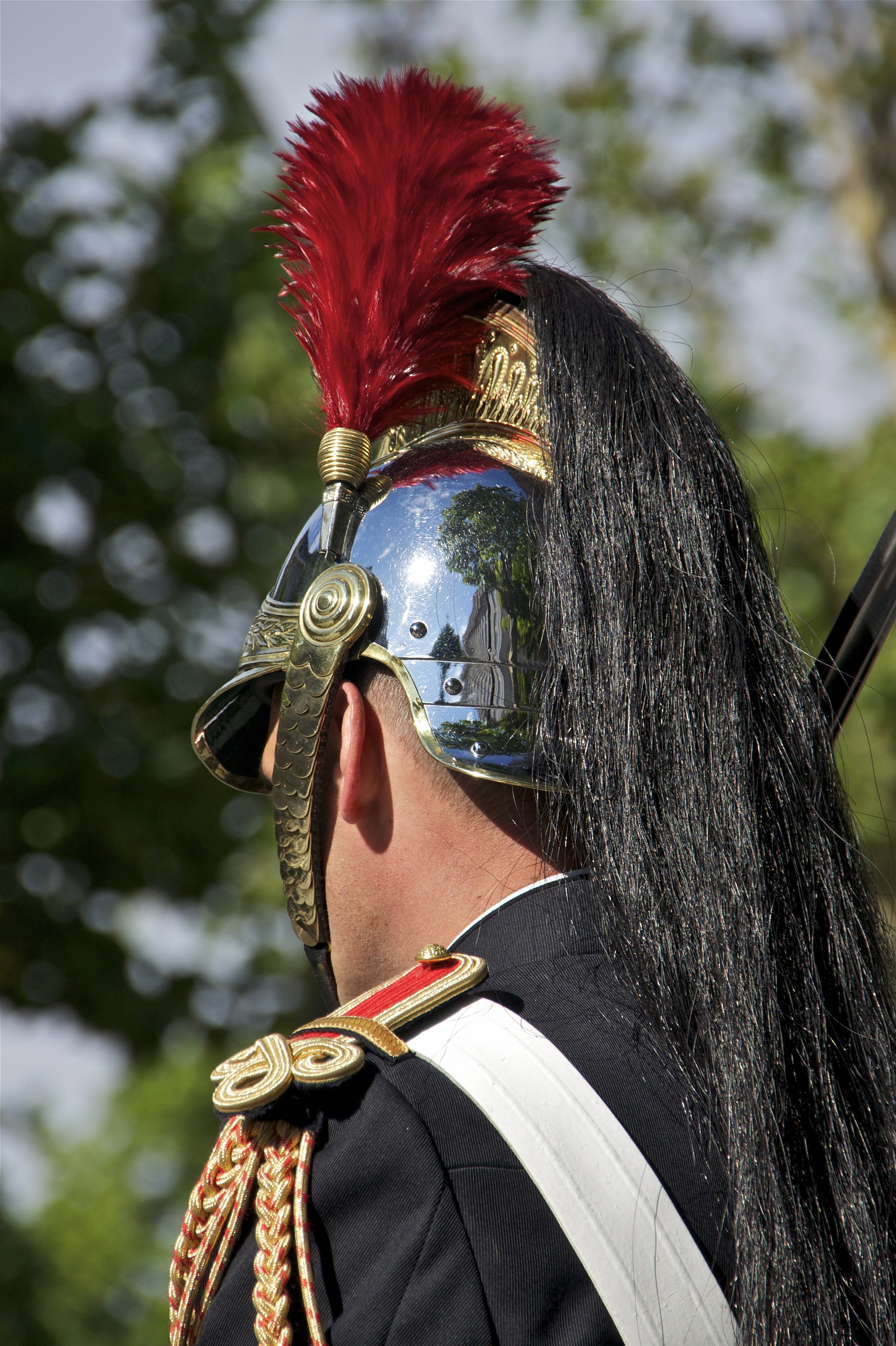
A panache, the horsetail plume on a cavalry helmet (here, the French Garde Républicaine), and according to Tom Shippey the name for Rohan's defining "virtue of sudden onset", since it streams dramatically in a cavalry charge.

The Tolkien scholar Jane Chance writes that Théoden is transformed by Gandalf into a good bold "Germanic king"; she contrasts this with the failure of "the proud Beorhtnoth" in the Old English poem The Battle of Maldon. In her view, in the account of the battle of Helm's Deep, the fortress of the Riddermark, Tolkien is emphasising the Rohirrim's physical prowess.

Jane Ciabattari writes on BBC Culture that Lady Éowyn's fear of being caged rather than "doing great deeds" by riding to battle with the Rohirrim resonated with 1960s feminists, contributing to the success of Lord of the Rings at that time.

The philologist and Tolkien scholar Tom Shippey notes that the Riders of Rohan are, despite Tolkien's protestations, much like the ancient English (the Anglo-Saxons), but that they differed from the ancient English in having a culture based on horses. They use many Old English words related to horses; their name for themselves is Éotheod, horse-people, and the names of riders like Éomund, Éomer, and Éowyn begin with the word for "horse", eo[h]. In Shippey's view, a defining virtue of the Riders is panache, which he explains means both "the white horsetail on [Éomer's] helm floating in his speed" and "the virtue of sudden onset, the dash that sweeps away resistance." Shippey notes that this allows Tolkien to display Rohan both as English, based on their Old English names and words like éored ("troop of cavalry"), and as "alien, to offer a glimpse of the way land shapes people". Shippey states further that "the Mark" (or the Riddermark), the land of the Riders of Rohan – all of whom have names in the Mercian dialect of Old English, was once the usual term for central England, and it would have been pronounced and written "marc" rather than the West Saxon "mearc" or the Latinized "Mercia".

The Tolkien scholar Thomas Honegger, agreeing with Shippey's description of the Rohirrim as "Anglo-Saxons on Horseback", calls the sources for them "quite obvious to anyone familiar with Anglo-Saxon literature and culture". The resemblances, according to Honegger, include masterly horsemanship, embodying the Old English saying Éorl sceal on éos boge, éored sceal getrume rídan ("The leader shall on horse's back, warband shall ride in a body"). The Riders are a Germanic warrior-society, exemplifying the "northern heroic spirit", like the Anglo-Saxons. But the "crucial" fact is the language; Honegger notes that Tolkien had represented Westron speech as modern English; since Rohan spoke a related but older language, Old English was the natural choice in the same style; Tolkien's 1942 table of correspondences also showed that the language of the people of Dale was represented by Norse. Honegger notes that this does not equate the Rohirrim with the Anglo-Saxons (on horseback or not), but it does show a strong connection, making them "the people most dear to Tolkien and all medievalists."

The mapping of Old English to Modern English is like the mapping of Rohirric to Westron, and Tolkien uses the two Germanic languages to represent the two Middle-earth languages. Further, Tolkien uses Gothic names for the early leaders of the Northmen of Rhovanion, ancestors of Rohan.

== Portrayal in adaptations ==
Edoras in The Lord of the Rings films

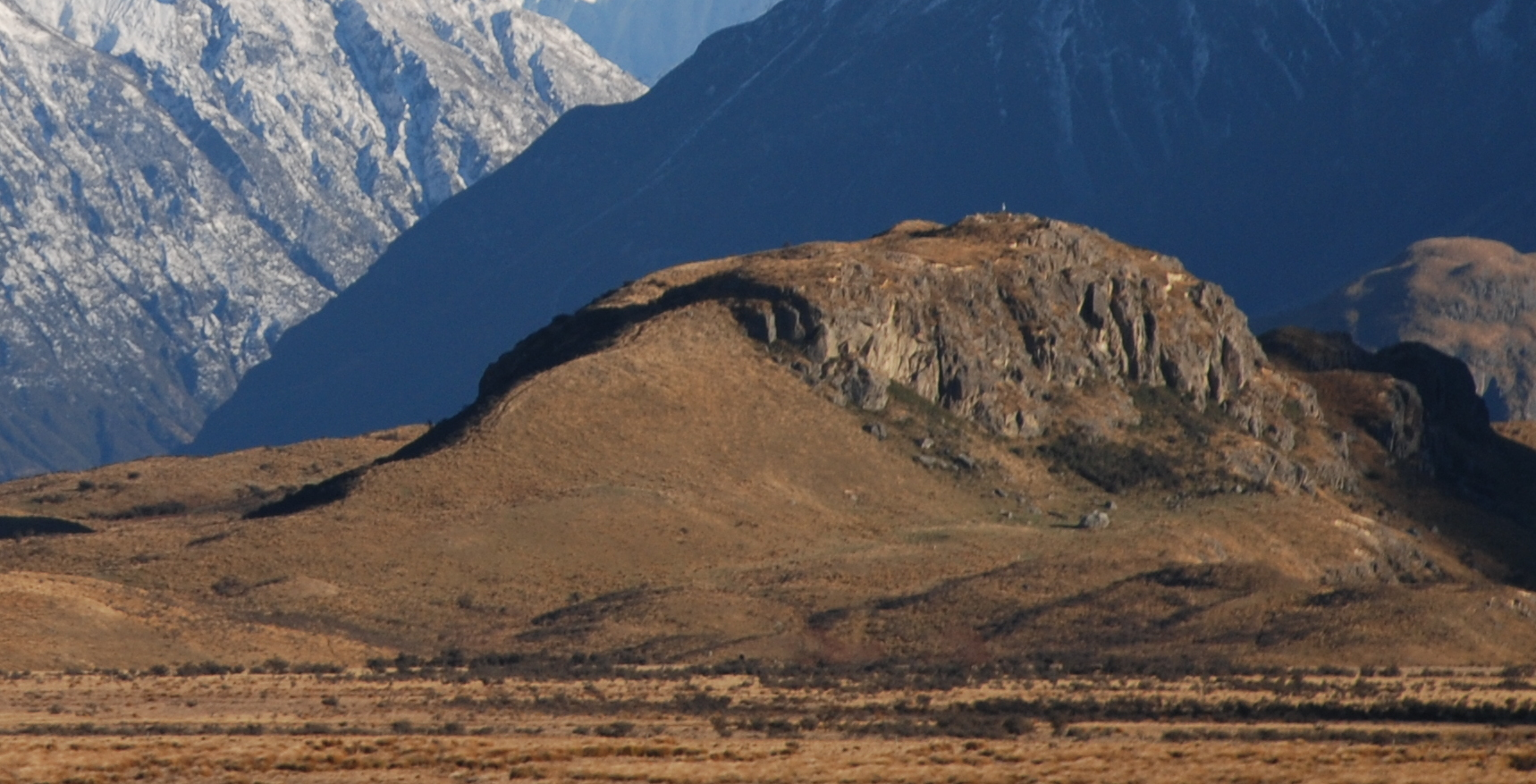
Mount Sunday, New Zealand

For Peter Jackson's The Lord of the Rings film trilogy, the Poolburn Reservoir in Central Otago, New Zealand was used for Rohan scenes. The theme for Rohan is played on a Hardanger fiddle.

A fully realised set for Edoras was built on Mount Sunday in the upper reaches of the Rangitata Valley, near Erewhon in New Zealand. Some of the set was built digitally, but the main buildings atop the city were built on location; the mountain ranges in the background were part of the actual location shot. The interiors of buildings such as the Golden Hall, however, were located on soundstages in other parts of New Zealand; when the camera is inside of the Golden Hall, looking out the open gates, the image of the on-set Edoras set is digitally inserted into the door-frame. The site was known among the cast and crew for being extremely windy, as can be seen during the film and DVD interviews. After filming, Mount Sunday was returned to its original state, but even with no remaining set the location is a popular Tolkien tourism destination.

== Sources ==
- Bosworth, Joseph; Toller, T. Northcote (1898). An Anglo-Saxon Dictionary. Prague: Charles University.
- Carpenter, Humphrey, ed. (2023) [1981]. The Letters of J. R. R. Tolkien: Revised and Expanded Edition. New York: HarperCollins. ISBN 978-0-35-865298-4.
- Cusack, Carole M. (2011). The Sacred Tree: Ancient and Medieval Manifestations. Cambridge Scholars Publishing. ISBN 978-1-4438-3031-7.
- Fonstad, Karen Wynn (1994). The Atlas of Tolkien's Middle-earth. HarperCollins. ISBN 0-261-10277-X.
- Hammond, Wayne G.; Scull, Christina (2005). The Lord of the Rings: A Reader's Companion. HarperCollins. ISBN 978-0-00-720907-1.
- Lee, Stuart D.; Solopova, Elizabeth (2005). The Keys of Middle-earth. Palgrave Macmillan. ISBN 978-1137454690.
- Lee, Stuart D. (2009). "J.R.R. Tolkien and 'The Wanderer'". Tolkien Studies. 6 (1): 189–211. doi:10.1353/tks.0.0060. S2CID 171082666.
- Lobdell, Jared (1975). A Tolkien Compass. Open Court Press. ISBN 978-0875483030.
- Shippey, Tom (2005) [1982]. The Road to Middle-Earth (Third ed.). Grafton (HarperCollins). ISBN 978-0261102750.
- Shippey, Tom (2001). J. R. R. Tolkien: Author of the Century. HarperCollins. ISBN 978-0261-10401-3.
- Sipahi, Peri (2016). 'A Mighty Matter of Legend': Tolkien's Rohirrim. A Source Study. Tectum Wissenschaftsverlag. ISBN 978-3-8288-6568-6.
- Smith, Arden R. (2020) [2014]. "Invented Languages and Writing Systems". In Lee, Stuart D. (ed.). A Companion to J. R. R. Tolkien. Wiley Blackwell. pp. 202–214. ISBN 978-1119656029. OCLC 1183854105.
- Solopova, Elizabeth (2009). Languages, Myths and History: An Introduction to the Linguistic and Literary Background of J. R. R. Tolkien's Fiction. New York City: North Landing Books. ISBN 978-0-9816607-1-4.
- Tolkien, J. R. R. (1954). The Two Towers. The Lord of the Rings. Boston: Houghton Mifflin. OCLC 1042159111.
- Tolkien, J. R. R. (1955). The Return of the King. The Lord of the Rings. Boston: Houghton Mifflin. OCLC 519647821.
- Tolkien, J. R. R. (1967). Nomenclature of The Lord of the Rings. reprinted in Hammond, Wayne G.; Scull, Christina (2005), The Lord of the Rings: A Reader's Companion, HarperCollins, ISBN 0-00-720907-X.
- Tolkien, J. R. R. (1980). Christopher Tolkien (ed.). Unfinished Tales. Boston: Houghton Mifflin. ISBN 978-0-395-29917-3.
- Tolkien, J. R. R. (1996). Christopher Tolkien (ed.). The Peoples of Middle-earth. Boston: Houghton Mifflin. ISBN 978-0-395-82760-4.
- Tolkien, J. R. R. (July 2001). Hostetter, Carl F. (ed.). "The Rivers and Beacon-hills of Gondor". Vinyar Tengwar (42): 8.
- Wynne, Hilary (2006). "Rohan". In Drout, Michael D. C. (ed.). The J. R. R. Tolkien Encyclopedia: Scholarship and Critical Assessment. Routledge. pp. 575–576. ISBN 0-415-96942-5.
