= Media pilgrimage =

Visiting a place associated with a media work

A media pilgrimage refers to a journey made to a place associated with a piece of media, such as literature, music, anime, film and television. Destinations include, but are not limited to, filming locations, studio sets or places referenced in a media text. The term originates from the religious practice of pilgrimage and, by the early 1990s, was widely adopted to describe secular tourism. For example, the media frequently referred to fans’ visits to Elvis Presley’s home, Graceland, as pilgrimages. The term is generally traced back to Nick Couldry’s study of visitors to the Coronation Street set in Manchester. Since then, scholars have used related terms to describe this tourist phenomenon, such as “symbolic pilgrimage”, “fan pilgrimage” and “media tourism”. A separate term developed in Japan, where fans travelled to real-world locations featured in anime and manga, called seichi junrei. Much like its English counterpart, the term borrows religious vocabulary to describe a secular practice.

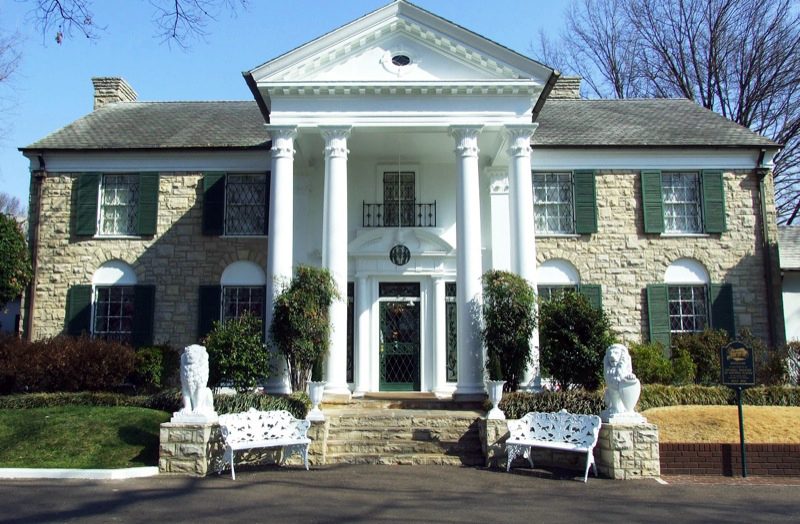
Graceland, Elvis Presley's home, is a popular attraction for fans visiting Memphis, Tennessee.

== Theory ==
Sociologist Nick Couldry’s theory of media pilgrimage focuses heavily on its connection to ritual practice. He draws from sociologist Émile Durkheim’s study of ritual as an essential element of religion. According to Durkheim, rituals are used to divide the world into two spheres; the sacred and the profane. In the context of media pilgrimage, the journey occurs from the everyday space to the media space, where places in the media space are given special significance. Being in the media space gives these locations a ritual significance, which draws visitors to make a pilgrimage. Media pilgrimage points are examples of the media’s symbolic power and authority. The distinction between the everyday space and media space can be delineated by a boundary. For example, when visiting the set of the popular soap opera Coronation Street, visitors spoke of “stepping onto” the Street when they entered the set.

Media pilgrimage and traditional pilgrimage share a similar goal of visiting a sacred place as their primary objective, with the journeys helping to reinforce the sacredness of the destinations. However, the line between traditional pilgrimages and tourism is not always clear. Sociologists have argued that the term “pilgrimage” has been widened. Modern pilgrims create their own sacred spaces that are not inherently connected to religion, like the graves of historical figures, roadside memorials or celebrity homes. Media pilgrimage is also often associated with fandom. Fan communities’ emotional attachments and journeys to a physical space makes the place itself sacred and lends it a sense of authenticity.

== Motivations ==
Fans undertake media pilgrimages for three distinct, yet interconnected, reasons. The first is emotional, as fans engage in media pilgrimages in an attempt to recapture the fleeting emotional connections they experienced through a particular film, television show, or other media.

The second is social and related to the "collective affect" of shared emotional experience among fans with a common goal, making the trip a way of belonging to a community. Scholars have mobilized the idea of the "collective affect," where shared emotional experiences develop among a group of individuals pursuing common objectives as a powerful force for movement. The last is symbolic, where Couldry argues that media constructs a "centre" that feels more significant than everyday life. Visiting a site is motivated by the feeling of stepping into a world and feeling closer to it.

With the rise of popular culture, what it means to be a fan has been fundamentally altered. How fans conceive of themselves is now affected by dominant social and economic narratives, where audiences are now active participants in a commercial entertainment economy. The tourism industry has adapted to include popular culture, and as standards of living rise and people have more free time, fans can now freely engage with the physical locations of their favourite pieces of media.

== Impacts ==
Research on media pilgrimages has shown that tourism trends to countries portrayed on the screen, such as South Korea and England, show increased arrivals of tourists. In 2018, a small town in Mexico, Santa Fe de la Laguna, saw a 22% increase in tourism, as it was believed to be the real life version of the town of Santa Cecilia from the Disney film, Coco.

Mount Titlis Cable Car is a popular attraction for Bollywood fans visiting Switzerland

Media pilgrimages also contribute to the planning, design, and marketing of cities. The Swiss Tourism Board has identified Indian tourists as a key marketing demographic due to the amount of Bollywood films that have been filmed in Switzerland. Entrepreneurs in Jungfraujoch, Engelberg, and Mount Titlis have capitalized on the presence of Indian tourists through ventures such as opening restaurants and offering guided tours related specifically to Bollywood.

== Instances ==
Media Type	Location	Media Reference
Pop-culture site	Graceland, Memphis, Tennessee, United States	Elvis Presley's home
Literature	Aoyama Itchome Subway Station, Tokyo, Japan	Hard-Boiled Wonderland and the End of the World by Haruki Murakami
Film	Phang Nga Bay, Thailand	The Man with the Golden Gun, James Bond
Television series	Vancouver, British Columbia, Canada	The X-Files
Film	Interlaken, Switzerland	Dilwale Dulhania Le Jayenge
Album	Abbey Road, London, England	Abbey Road, Beatles
Television series	Place de l'Estrapade in Paris's 5th arrondissement, Paris, France	Emily in Paris

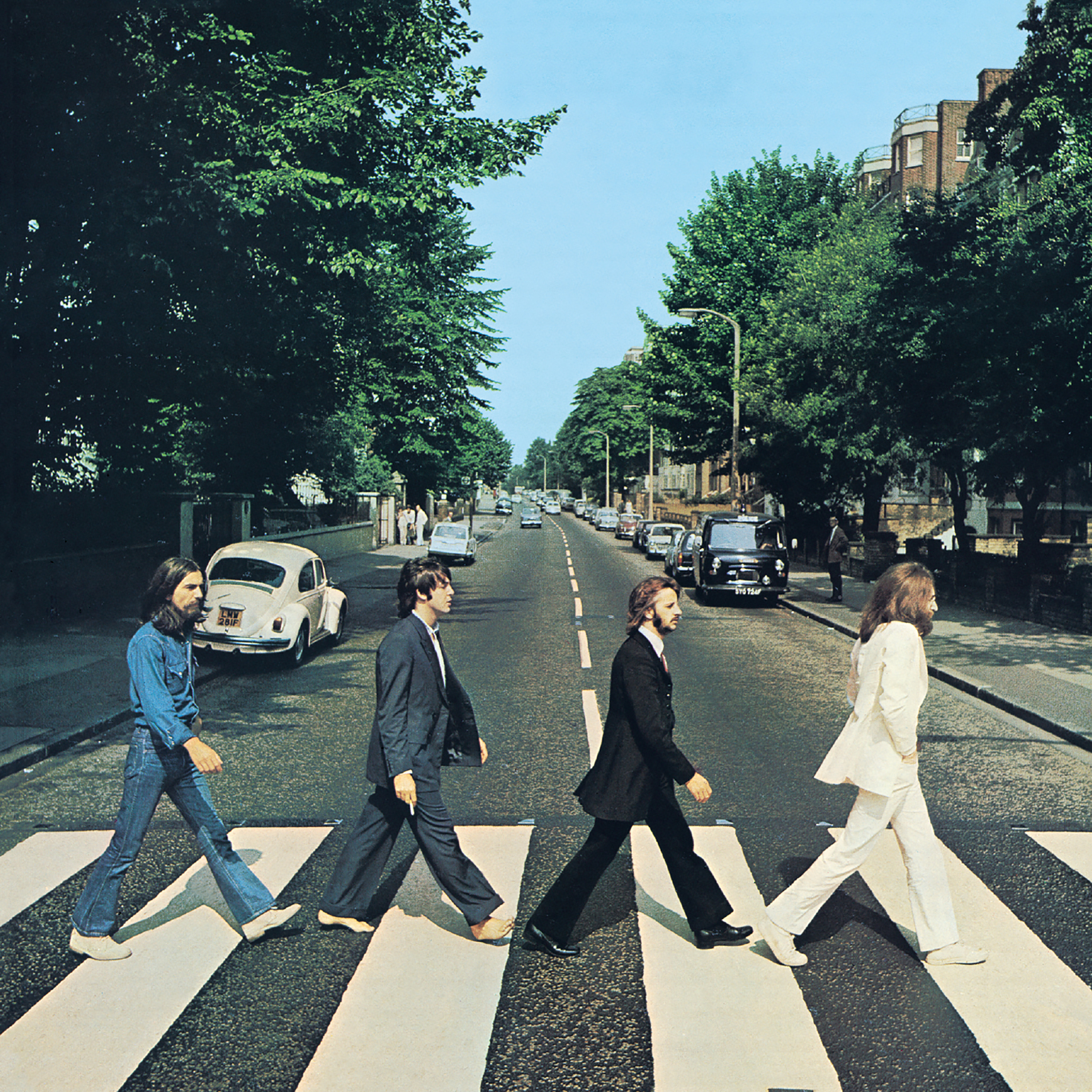
The Abbey Road crossing as seen on the Beatles Abbey Road album cover is a popular media pilgrimage site for fans who often recreate the cover art.

== See also ==
- Pop-culture tourism
- Film tourism
- Literary tourism
- Seichi junrei
- Pilgrimage
