= List of translations of The Lord of the Rings =

List of fantasy books

J. R. R. Tolkien's fantasy novel The Lord of the Rings has been translated, with varying degrees of success, many times since its publication in 1954–55. Known translations are listed here; the exact number is hard to determine, for example because the European and Brazilian dialects of Portuguese are sometimes counted separately, as are the Nynorsk and Bokmål forms of Norwegian, and the Traditional and Simplified Chinese forms of that language.

Elrond's Library, as of its last updating in 2019, explicitly lists 87 translations in 57 languages. The Tolkien Gateway has a list of translations without details. Many separate collectors have sites that highlight their personal collections with more detail. Some of the more extensive sites include Elrond's Library, The Lord of the Rings in Translation, Impressions of Books by J.R.R. Tolkien Published in Japan, and the Tolkieniano Collection (in Italian). Editions of all the translations in this list can be found illustrated in one or more of these collections.

The book Толкин Русскими Глазами (Tolkin Russkimi Glazami, "Tolkien Through Russian Eyes") contains a detailed listing and history of the multiple Russian translations. Tolkien became personally involved with the Swedish translation, which he much disliked; he eventually produced his "Guide to the Names in The Lord of the Rings" in response.

The linguist Thomas Honegger has edited two books on the challenges of translating Tolkien: Tolkien in Translation and Translating Tolkien: Text and Film. The first volume looks at the theoretical problem, and then analyses translations into Esperanto, French, Norwegian, Russian, and Spanish to see how translators have coped with the issues discussed. The second volume looks at translation into Dutch, German, Hebrew, and Swedish, and analyses particularly complex issues such as translating Tolkien's constructed languages.

== Translations ==
| Language | Title | Year | Translator | Publisher | ISBN |
|---|---|---|---|---|---|
| Afrikaans | Die Heerser Van Die Ringe | 2018 to 2020 | Janie Oosthuysen (1), Kobus Geldenhuys (2, 3) | Protea Boekhuis, Pretoria | 978-1-4853-0975-8, 978-1-4853-0976-5, 978-1-4853-0977-2 |
| Albanian | Lordi i unazave, republished as Kryezoti i unazave | 2004 to 2006 | Ilir I. Baçi (part 1), Artan Miraka (2 and 3) | Dudaj, Tirana | 99927-50-96-0 99943-33-11-9 99943-33-58-5 |
| Arabic | سيد الخواتم، رفقة الخاتم، خروج الخاتمSayyid al-Khawātim, Rafīqat al-Khātim, Khurūj al-Khātim | 2007 | Amr Khairy | Malamih, Cairo | 978-977-6262-03-4, only The Fellowship of the Ring, Book I |
| Arabic | سيد الخواتم Sayyid al-Khawātim | 2009 | Farajallah Sayyid Muhammad | Nahdet Misr, Cairo | 977-14-4114-0, 977-14-1134-9, 977-14-1127-6 |
| Armenian | Պահապաննէրը Pahapannērë | 1989 | Emma Makarian | Arevnik, Yerevan | Only The Fellowship of the Ring, no ISBN |
| Asturian | El Señor de los Aniellos | 2020-2024 | Nicolás Bardio | Ediciones Trabe | 978-84-18286-34-6, 978-84-19358-02-8, 978-84-19358-93-6 |
| Azerbaijani | Üzüklərin Hökmdarı | 2020 to 2021 | Samir Bulut | Qanun Nəşriyyatı | 978-9-9523-6832-1, 978-9952-38-002-6 (I, III only, II has no ISBN) |
| Basque | Eraztunen Jauna | 2002 to 2003 | Agustin Otsoa Eribeko | Txalaparta, Tafalla | 84-8136-258-1 |
| Belarusian | Уладар пярсьцёнкаў: Зьвяз пярсьцёнка, Дзьве вежы, Вяртаньне караля Uladar piarścionkaŭ: Źviaz piarścionka, Dźvie viežy, Viartańnie karalia | 2008 to 2009 | Дзьмітрый Магілеўцаў and Крысьціна Курчанкова (Dźmitry Mahileŭcaŭ and Kryścina Kurčankova) | Minsk | 978-985-4921-24-3 |
| Belarusian | Валадар Пярсцёнкаў: Брацтва Пярсцёнка, Дзве Вежы, Вяртанне Караля Valadar Piarścionkaŭ: Bractva Piarscionka, Dzvie Viežy, Viartannie Karalia | 2023-2024 | Ihar Kulikou | Andrei Yanushkevich Publishing, Warsaw | 978-83-969297-6-1, 978-83-68202-07-6, 978-83-68202-19-9 |
| Bengali (Bangladesh) | দি লর্ড অফ দ্য রিংস Di larḍa apha dya rinsa (I only) | 2020 | Moheul Islam Mithu | Aishwarya Prakash | The ISBN printed in the book is improperly formatted, 978-91288-3-X |
| Bengali (India) | সর্বাধিপতি আংটি Sarbādhipati āṇṭi (I, II only) | 2012 to 2013 | Aniruddha | Cinnamon Teal Publishing | 978-93-81542-61-3, 978-93-80151-76-2 |
| Bulgarian | Властелинът на пръстените Vlastelinăt na prăstenite | 1990 to 1991 | Lyubomir Nikolov | Narodna Kultura Sofia | —N/a |
| Catalan | El Senyor dels Anells | 1986 to 1988 | Francesc Parcerisas | Vicens Vives, Barcelona | 84-316-6868-7 |
| Chinese (Simplified) | 魔戒; mojie ("The Magic Ring") | 2001 | Book One – Book Two: Ding Di (丁棣); Book Three – Book Four: Yao Jing-rong (姚锦镕); Book Five – Book Six: Tang Ding-jiu (汤定九) | Yilin Press (译林出版社), Nanjing | 7-80657-267-8 |
| Chinese (Simplified) | 魔戒 | 2001, rev. 2012 | Zhu Xueheng, rev. Deng Jiawan | Shanghai Translation Publishing House, Shanghai | 978-7-5327-9321-1 |
| Chinese (Simplified) | 魔戒 | 2013 | Deng Jiawan / 邓嘉宛 (story), Shi Zhongge / 石中歌 (preface, prologue, appendix, and checking), Du Yunci / 杜蕴慈 (poems) | Wenjing, ISBN licensing by Shanghai People's Press | 9787208113039 |
| Chinese (Simplified) | 魔戒 | 2024 | Tian Weihua | Zhejiang People's Publishing House, Hangzhou | 978-7-213-11320-8 |
| Chinese (Simplified) | 魔戒 | 2024 | Wang Jinhua | Democracy and Construction Press, Beijing | 978-7-5139-4574-5 |
| Chinese (Simplified) | 魔戒 | 2024 | Yan Yong (Fellowship of the Ring); Xin Hongjuan (Two Towers); Lu Danjun (Return of the King) | People's Literature Publishing House, Beijing | 978-7-02-018431-6 |
| Chinese (Simplified) | 魔戒 | 2024 | Liu Guowei (Fellowship of the Ring); Shan Nana (Two Towers, Return of the King) | Xi'an Publishing House, Xi'an | 978-7-5541-7313-8 |
| Chinese (Simplified) | 魔戒 | 2024 | Long Fei | Jiangxi University Press | 978-7-5762-4428-1 |
| Chinese (Simplified) | 魔戒 | 2025 | Sun Hua | Tiandi Press | 978-7-5455-8626-8 |
| Chinese (Simplified) | 指环王三部曲 | 2025 | He Weiqing | Jinan Publishing House | 978-7-5488-6875-0, 978-7-5488-6876-7, 978-7-5488-6877-4 |
| Chinese (Simplified) | 魔戒 | 2025 | Chen Sen (Abridged and simplified translation) | Popular Science Press | 978-7-110-10965-6 |
| Chinese (Traditional) | 魔戒 | 2001 to 2002 | Lucifer Chu (朱學恆) | Linking Publishing, Taipei | 957-08-2336-4, 957-08-2337-2, 957-08-2338-0 |
| Chinese (Traditional) | 魔戒 | 2024 | Li Han | Shuangxi Publishing, Taipei | 978-626-97933-5-8, 978-626-97933-6-5, 978-626-97933-7-2 |
| Croatian | Gospodar prstenova | 1995 | Zlatko Crnković | Algoritam | 953-6166-05-4 |
| Croatian | Gospodar Prstenova | 2018 | Marko Maras | Lumen | 978-953-342-154-4, 978-953-342-155-1, 978-953-342-156-8 |
| Czech | Pán prstenů | 1990 to 1992 | Stanislava Pošustová(-Menšíková) | Mladá fronta, Prague | 80-204-0105-9, 80-204-0194-6, 80-204-0259-4 |
| Danish | Ringenes Herre | 1968 to 1972 | Ida Nyrop Ludvigsen | Gyldendal, Copenhagen | 978-87-02-04320-4 |
| Dutch | In de Ban van de Ring | 1957 | Max Schuchart | Het Spectrum, Utrecht | —N/a |
| Esperanto | La Mastro de l' Ringoj | 1995 to 1997, 2nd ed. 2007 | William Auld | Sezonoj, Yekaterinburg, Kaliningrad | 5745004576, 9785745004575 |
| Estonian | Sõrmuste Isand | 1996 to 1998 | Ene Aru and Votele Viidemann | Tiritamm, Tallinn | 9985-55-039-0, 9985-55-046-3, 9985-55-049-8 |
| Faroese | Ringanna Harri | 2003 to 2005 | Axel Tórgarð | Stiðin, Hoyvík | 99918-42-33-0, 99918-42-34-9, 99918-42-38-1 |
| Finnish | Taru sormusten herrasta | 1973 to 1975 | Kersti Juva, Eila Pennanen, Panu Pekkanen | —N/a | —N/a |
| French | Le Seigneur des anneaux | 1972 to 1973 | Francis Ledoux | Christian Bourgois | 9782266201728 |
| French | Le Seigneur des anneaux | 2014 to 2016 | Daniel Lauzon | Christian Bourgois | 9782267027006 |
| Frisian | Master fan alle ringen | 2011 to 2016 | Liuwe Westra | Frysk en Frij and Elikser, Leeuwarden | 978-90-8566-022-4, 978-90-825871-0-4 (I & II only) |
| Galician | O Señor dos Aneis | 2001 to 2002 | Moisés R. Barcia | Xerais, Vigo | 84-8302-682-1 |
| Georgian | ბეჭდების მბრძანებელი: ბეჭდის საძმო, ორი ციხე–კოშკი, მეფის დაბრუნება Bech'debis Mbrdzanebeli: Bech'dis Sadzmo, Ori Tsikhe-k'oshki, Mepis Dabruneba | 2009 to 2011 | Nika Samushia (prose and poems) and Tsitso Khotsuashvili (poems in The Fellowship of the Ring) | Gia Karchkhadze Publishing, Tbilisi | 978-99940-34-04-8, 978-99940-34-13-0, 978-99940-34-14-7 |
| German | Der Herr der Ringe | 1969 to 1970 | Margaret Carroux and Ebba-Margareta von Freymann (poems) | Klett-Cotta, Stuttgart | 978-3-608-93666-7 |
| German | Der Herr der Ringe | 2000 | Wolfgang Krege | Klett-Cotta, Stuttgart | 978-3-608-93639-1 |
| Greek | Ο Άρχοντας των Δαχτυλιδιών O Archontas ton Dachtylidion | 1978 | Eugenia Chatzithanasi-Kollia | Kedros, Athens | 960-04-0308-2 |
| Hebrew | שר הטבעות Sar ha-Tabbaot | 1979 to 1980 | Ruth Livnit | Zmora-Bitan, Tel Aviv | —N/a |
| Hungarian | A Gyűrűk Ura | 1981 | Chapters 1-11: Ádám Réz; Rest: Árpád Göncz and Dezső Tandori (poems) | Gondolat Könyvkiadó (1981); Európa Könyvkiadó (since 1990), Budapest | First: 963-280-963-7, 963-280-964-5, 963-280-965-3; 2008 reworked: 978-963-07-8646-1 |
| Icelandic | Hringadróttinssaga | 1993 to 1995, 2nd ed. 2003 | Þorsteinn Thorarensen and Geir Kristjánsson (poems) | Fjölvi, Reykjavík | 9979-58-364-9, 9979-58-366-5, 9979-58-365-7 |
| Indonesian | The Lord of the Rings (publication is under the English name) | 2002 to 2003 | Gita K. Yuliani | Gramedia, Jakarta | 9796866935, 9792200355, 979220556-X |
| Italian | Il Signore degli Anelli | 1967 to 1970 | Vittoria Alliata di Villafranca | Bompiani, Milan | 9788845210273 |
| Italian | Il Signore degli Anelli | 2020 to 2021 | Ottavio Fatica | Bompiani | 978-88-452-9919-3, 978-88-301-0271-2, 978-88-301-0272-9 |
| Japanese | Yubiwa Monogatari (指輪物語; lit. "The tale of the Ring(s)") | 1972 to 1975 | Teiji Seta (瀬田貞二) and Akiko Tanaka (田中明子) | Hyouronsha(評論社), Tokyo | 978-4-566-02350-5, 978-4-566-02351-2, 978-4-566-02352-9 |
| Kazakh | Сақиналар Әміршісі | 2022 to 2024 | Altynzhan Iralieva (1), Aizhan Bozbaeva (2-3) | Foliant, Astana | 978-601-271-785-3, 978-601-271-957-4, 978-601-338-853-3 |
| Korean | 반지 이야기 (Banji iyagi), (reprinted as 완역 반지제왕 (Wanyeok Banjijewang)) | 1988 to 1992 | 강영운 (Kang Yeong-un) | Dongsuh Press, Seoul | —N/a |
| Korean | 반지전쟁 (Banjijeonjaeng), (reprinted as 반지의 제왕 (Banjieui Jewang)) | 1990 | 김번, 김보원, 이미애 (Kim Beon, Kim Bo-won, Yee Mi-ae) | Doseochulpan Yemun, Seoul | 8986834200, 8986834219, 8986834227 |
| Korean | 마술반지 (Masulbanji) | 1992 to 1994 | 이동진 (Lee Dong-jin) | Pauline (Baorottal), Seoul | Only The Fellowship of the Ring and The Two Towers. 8933103422 (I) |
| Korean | 반지의 제왕 (Banjieui Jewang) | 2001 | 한기찬 (Han Ki-chan) | 황금가지 (Hwanggeum Gaji), Seoul | 6 volumes. 8982732888, 8982732896, 898273290X, 8982732918, 8982732926, 8982732934, 898273287X (set) |
| Latvian | Gredzenu Pavēlnieks | 2002 to 2004 | Ieva Kolmane | Jumava, Riga | 9984-05-579-5, 9984-05-626-0, 9984-05-861-1 |
| Lithuanian | Žiedų valdovas | 1994 | Andrius Tapinas and Jonas Strielkūnas | Alma littera, Vilnius | 9986-02-038-7, 9986-02-487-0, 9986-02-959-7 |
| Macedonian | Господарот на прстените Gospodarot na prstenite | 2002 | Ofelija Kaviloska & Romeo Širilov | AEA, Misla, Skopje | 9989-39-170-X, 9989-39-173-4, 9989-39-176-9 |
| Marathi | स्वामी मुद्रिकांचा Swami Mudrikancha (I, II, III) | 2015 | Mugdha Karnik | Diamond Publications, Pune | 978-8184836219 |
| Mongolian | Бөгжний Эзэн, Bögjnii Ezen | 2009 | Ukhnaagiin Nyamsuren (translated from Russian) | Khökh Devter | 9789996221255 |
| Mongolian | ᠪᠥᠭᠵᠨᠢᠢ ᠡᠽᠡᠨ, Bögjnii Ezen | 2014 | Wuyunqimuge | Inner Mongolian Education Press | 978-7-5311-8881-0, 978-7-5311-8893-3, 978-7-5311-8900-8 |
| Mongolian (Монгол) | Бөгжний Эзэн, Bögjnii Ezen | 2022-2025 | B. Amarbayasgalan (official) | Monsudar | 978-9919-28-115-1, 978-9919-28-178-6, 978-9919-28-247-9 |
| Norwegian (Bokmål) | Krigen om ringen | 1973 to 1975 | Nils Werenskiold | Tiden Norsk Forlag | 82-10-00816-1, 82-10-00930-3, 82-10-01096-4 |
| Norwegian (Bokmål) | Ringenes herre | 1980 to 1981 | Torstein Bugge Høverstad | Tiden Norsk Forlag | 978-82-10-04449-6 |
| Norwegian (Nynorsk) | Ringdrotten | 2006 | Eilev Groven Myhren | Tiden Norsk Forlag, Oslo | 82-05-36559-8 |
| Persian | ارباب حلقه‌ها Arbāb-e Halqehā | 2002 to 2004 | Riza Alizadih | Rawzanih, Tehran | 964-334-116-X, 964-334-139-9, 964-334-173-9 |
| Persian | خداوند انگشتری‌ها Khedawend Anegushetra | 2017 | Farrokhazad Farzin Zand | ParNashr | 978-600-8137-49-8, 978-600-8137-50-4, 978-600-8137-51-1 |
| Persian | ارباب حلقه هآ‌ها Arbāb-e Halqehā | 2025 | Motaharah Ebrahimzadeh | Negahe Ashena Publishing | 978-622-5260-64-1, 978-622-5260-65-8, 978-622-5260-66-5 |
| Polish | Władca Pierścieni | 1961 to 1963 | Maria Skibniewska (poems by Włodzimierz Lewik and Andrzej Nowicki) | Czytelnik, Warsaw | —N/a |
| Polish | Władca Pierścieni | 1996 to 1997 | Jerzy Łozinski and Marek Obarski (poems) | Zysk i S-ka, Poznań | 8371502419, 8371502427, 8371502435 |
| Polish | Władca Pierścieni | 2001 | Books I – IV: Maria and Cezary Frąc; Book V: Aleksandra Januszewska; Book VI: Aleksandra Jagiełowicz; Poems: Tadeusz A. Olszański; Appendices: Ryszard Derdziński | Amber, Warszawa | 8372457018, 8324132872, 978-83-241-4424-2 |
| Portuguese (BRA) | O Senhor dos Anéis | 1974 to 1979 | António Rocha and Alberto Monjardim (unauthorized) | Publicações Europa-América | 978-972-1-04102-8, 978-972-1-04144-8, 978-972-1-04154-7 |
| Portuguese (BRA) | O Senhor dos Anéis | 1994 | Lenita Maria Rimoli Esteves and Almiro Pisetta | Martins Fontes | 978-85-3360-292-2, 978-85-3360-314-1, 978-85-3360-315-8 |
| Portuguese (BRA) | O Senhor dos Anéis | 2019 | Ronald Eduard Kyrmse | HarperCollins Brasil | 85-336-1340-7 |
| Portuguese (POR) | O Senhor dos Anéis | 1977 | Fernanda Pinto Rodrigues | Publicações Europa-América | 972-1-04144-0, 972-1-04154-8, 972-1-04102-5 |
| Portuguese (POR) | O Senhor dos Anéis | 2020 | Catarina Ferreira de Almeida | Grupo Planeta | 978-989-777-392-1, 978-989-777-470-6, 978-989-777-548-2 |
| Romanian | Stăpînul Inelelor; Stăpânul Inelelor | 1999 to 2001 | Irina Horea, Gabriela Nedelea, Ion Horea | Editorial Group Rao | 978-606-609-367-5, 978-606-609-366-8, 978-606-609-365-1 |
| Russian | Властелин колец Vlastelin kolets | 1976 (publ. 2002) | A. A. Gruzberg; A. V. Zastyrets (poems) | U-Faktoriya, Yekaterinburg | 5-94799-164-0 |
| Russian | Властелин колец Vlastelin kolets | 1982 to 1992 | V. S. Muravyov (2nd to 6th books, poems), A. A. Kistyakovsky (first book) | Raduga, Moscow | 5-05-002255-X, 5-05-002397-1, 5-05-004017-5 |
| Russian | Властелин колец Vlastelin kolets | 1984 (publ. 1991) | H. V. Grigoryeva and V. I. Grushetskij and I. B. Grinshpun (poems) | Severo-Zapad | 5-7183-0003-8, 5-352-00312-4 (Azbuka) |
| Russian | Властители Колец Vlastiteli kolets | 1990 | Z.A. Bobyr' | Molodaya Gvardiya | 5235019466, 5235019458 (Condensed translation from 1966 with Hobbit & I in first volume and II & III in second volume) |
| Russian | Властелин колец Vlastelin kolets | 1991 | V.A.M. (Valeriya Aleksandrovna Matorina) | Amur, Khabarovsk | —N/a |
| Russian | Властелин колец Vlastelin kolets | 1994 | Mariya Kamenkovich and Valerij Karrik | Terra-Azbuka, St. Petersburg | 5-300-00027-2, 5-300-00026-4 |
| Russian | Властелин колец Vlastelin kolets | 2002 | V. Volkovskij, V. Vosedov, D. Afinogenova | AST, Moscow | 5-17-016265-0 |
| Russian | Властелин Колец Vlastelin kolets | 2002 | Alina V. Nemirova | AST, Kharkiv | 5-17-009975-4, 5-17-008954-6, 966-03-1122-2 (Folio) |
| Serbian | Господар Прстенова Gospodar Prstenova | 1981 | Zoran Stanojević | Nolit, Belgrade | —N/a |
| Sinhala | මුදු වල අධිපතියා Mudu vala adhipatiyā (I in two parts, II) | 2018 to 2019 (I), 2023 (II) | Kaveesha Nadun Kaggodaarachchi and Upekha Draupadhi Rajapaksha (I), Upekha Draupadhi Rajapaksha (II) | Muses Books | 978-955-37-2703-9 (Ia), 978-955-37-2708-4 (Ib), 978-624-5579-65-5 (II) |
| Slovak | Pán prsteňov | 2001 to 2002 | Otakar Kořínek and Braňo Varsik | Vydavatelstvo Slovart, Bratislava | 8071456063, 8071456071, 807145608-X |
| Slovenian | Gospodar prstanov | 1995 | Polona Mertelj, Primož Pečovnik, Zoran Obradovič | Gnosis-Quarto, Ljubljana | |
| Slovenian | Gospodar prstanov | 2001 | Branko Gradišnik | Mladinska knjiga, Ljubljana | 8611162447, 8611163001, 861116301-X |
| Slovenian | Gospodar prstanov | 2023 | Sergej Hvala | Mladinska knjiga | 978-961-016-906-2, 978-961-016-907-9, 978-961-016-908-6 |
| Spanish | El Señor de los Anillos | 1977 to 1980 | Luis Domènech (Francisco Porrúa) and Matilde Horne | Minotauro Buenos Aires | 84-450-7032-0 (Minotauro) |
| Swedish | Härskarringen (also known as Sagan om Ringen) | 1959 to 1961 | Åke Ohlmarks | Almqvist & Wiksell, Stockholm | 978-91-1-300998-8 |
| Swedish | Ringarnas herre | 2004 to 2005 | Erik Andersson and Lotta Olsson (poems) | Norstedts förlag | 91-1-301153-7 |
| Thai | ลอร์ดออฟเดอะริงส์ Lord oof doe rings | 2001 to 2002 | Wanlee Shuenyong | Amarin, Bangkok | 974-7597-54-3 |
| Turkish | Yüzüklerin Efendisi | 1996 to 1998 | Çiğdem Erkal İpek, Bülent Somay (poems) | Metis, Istanbul | 975-342-347-0 |
| Ukrainian | Володар Перснів Volodar Persniv | 2002 | Oleksandr Mokrovolskyi | Школа (Shkola) | 966-661-063-9 966-661-064-7 966-661-081-7 |
| Ukrainian | Володар Перснів Volodar Persniv | 2003 | Alina V. Nemirova | Фоліо (Folio) | 966-03-1915-0 966-03-1916-9 966-03-1917-7 |
| Ukrainian | Володар Перстенів Volodar Persteniv | 2004 to 2005 | Olena Feshovets, Nazar Fedorak (poems) | Astrolabia, Lviv | 966-8657-18-7 |
| Ukrainian | Володар перснів Volodar persniv | 2013 | Kateryna Onishchuk-Mikhalitsyna, Nazar Fedorak (poems) | Astrolabia, Lviv | 978-617-664-022-6, 978-617-664-023-3, 978-617-664-024-0 |
| Urdu | لارڈ آف دی رنگز Lard of di Rings | 2026 | Shaukat Nawaz Niazi | Book Corner, Jhelum | 978-969-662-655-8, 978-969-662-656-5, 978-969-662-657-2 |
| Uzbek | Uzuklar Hukmdori (I-II only) | 2019 to 2024 | Shokir Zokirovich Dolimov (from the Russian translation of V. S. Muravev and A. A. Kistyakovskij) | Ilm-ziyo-zakovat | 978-9943-6033-0-1, 978-9910-9061-9-0 |
| Vietnamese | Chúa tể những chiếc Nhẫn | 2013 to 2014 | (Prose) Nguyễn Thị Thu Yến (f), Đặng Trần Việt (m); Tâm Thuỷ (f); (Poetry) An Lý (f) | Nhã Nam, Hanoi | —N/a |
| Yiddish | דער האַר פֿון די פֿינגערלעך Der Har fun di Fingerlekh | 2016 | Barry Goldstein | —N/a | 978-1500410223, 978-1512129038, 978-1517654474 |

== See also ==
- Translations of The Hobbit

== Sources ==
- Carpenter, Humphrey, ed. (2023) [1981]. The Letters of J. R. R. Tolkien: Revised and Expanded Edition. New York: HarperCollins. ISBN 978-0-35-865298-4.
- Hammond, Wayne G.; Scull, Christina (2005). The Lord of the Rings: A Reader's Companion. London: HarperCollins. ISBN 0-00-720907-X.
