= Translations of The Hobbit =

J. R. R. Tolkien's The Hobbit has been translated into many languages. Known translations, with their first date of publication, are:

Language	Year	Title	Translator	Illustrator	Notes
Afrikaans	2017	Die Hobbit	Janie Oosthuysen		Pretoria: Protea Boekhuis ISBN 978-1-4853-0763-1
Albanian	2005	Hobiti	Maklen Misha		Tirana: Shtëpia e Librit & Komunikit ISBN 99943-641-8-9
Arabic	2008	الهوبيت، أو ذهابًا وعودة (Al-Hūbīt, aw Zehaban wa ʿAwda)	هشام فهمي - مي غنيم (Hisham Fahmy - May Ghanim)		Dokki, Giza: Dar Lila (No ISBN)
Armenian	1984	ՀՈԲԻՏ կամ գնալն ու գալը (HOBIT kam gnaln u galy)	Emma Makarian		Yerevan. Translated from the Russian translation by N. Rakhmanova. Uses the Belomlinskij illustrations from the Rakhmanova Russian edition.
Armenian	2014	Հոբիթը (Hobit'y)	Nune Torosyan. Edited by Zaven Boyajyan.		Yerevan. Maps are also translated.
Asturian	2014	El Hobbit	Miguel Gallego Gómez		Gijón. Published by Ediciones Terrier. ISBN 978-84-617-1545-9.
Belarusian	2002	Хобіт, або Вандроўка туды і назад (Hobit, abo Vandroŭka tudy i nazad)	K. Kurchankova and D. Magilevtsav		Minsk. Contains both maps with place-names in Belarusian, based on the Belomlinskij Russian maps.
Belarusian	2025	Хобіт, альбо Падарожжа туды і назад (Hobit, al'bo Padarožža tudy i nazad)	F. Korzun		
Basque	2008	Hobbita edo Joan-etorri bat	Sergio Ibarrola and Xabier Olarra		Pamplona: Igela Argitaletxea. ISBN 978-84-87484-88-9. Maps with place-names in English
Bengali	2011	হবিট (Hôbiţô)	Aniruddha		Margao: CinnamonTeal. ISBN 978-93-80151-93-9.
Breton	2001	An Hobbit, pe eno ha distro	Alan Dipode		Argenteuil: Éditions Arda. ISBN 2-911979-03-6. Contains both maps with place-names in Breton; the runes are translated into Breton.
Breton	2020	An Hobbit, pe, Eno ha Distro	Revised by Alan Dipode and Joshua Tyra		Dundee: Evertype. ISBN 978-1-78201-269-6 (hb), ISBN 978-1-78201-268-9 (pb). Revised and corrected edition. Breton maps, runes, and captions by Michael Everson. Contains both maps with place-names in Breton; the runes are translated into Breton. Includes all of Tolkien's illustrations with Breton captions. On the cup in the illustration "Conversations with Smaug" ('Kaozeadenn gant Smaog') the text in Tengwar and initials in runes are translated into Breton. Includes glossaries and translators' notes.
Bulgarian	1975	Билбо Бегинс или дотам и обратно (Bilbo Begins ili dotam i obratno)	Красимира Тодорова (Krasimira Todorova)	Peter Chouklev	Sofia: Narodna Mladezh (София, "Народна младеж"). Verse translations by Assen Todorov (Асен Тодоров).
Catalan	1983	El Hòbbit o viatge d'anada i tornada	Francesc Parcerisas		The runes and both maps (the one for the Wildlands and the other one for the Lonely Mountain) are in Catalan. Some names, though, remain in English (such as Baggins or Took, which in The Lord of the Rings are translated as Saquet and Tuc respectively). Published by La Magrana (Edicions de la Magrana, SA. Pàdua, 83, 08006, Barcelona) in April 1983 (first edition); the last edition was in May 2001 (20th edition). ISBN 84-8264-277-4.
Traditional Chinese	2001	魔戒前傳 哈比人歷險記 (Mojie qianzhuan: Habiren lixianji)	朱學恆 (Lucifer Chu)		Both maps are in Chinese. ISBN 957-08-2334-8
Simplified Chinese	2002	魔戒前传: 霍比特人 (Mojie qianzhuan: Huobiteren)	李尧 (Li Yao)		Nanjing: Yilin Press. 2000. ISBN 7-80657-190-6
Simplified Chinese	2013	霍比特人 (Huobiteren)	吴刚 (Wu Gang)		Shanghai: Shiji Wenjing; Shanghai People's Publishing House. 2013. ISBN 978-7-208-11102-8 authorized by the Tolkien Estate
Cornish	2014	An Hobys, pò, An Fordh Dy ha Tre Arta	Nicholas Williams		Cathair na Mart: Evertype, ISBN 978-1-78201-090-6 (hb), ISBN 978-1-78201-089-0 (pb). Contains both maps with place-names in Cornish; the runes are translated into Cornish. On the cup in the illustration "Conversations with Smaug" ('Kescows gans Smawg') the text in Tengwar and initials in runes are translated into Cornish.
Croatian	1994	Hobit ili tamo i opet natrag	Zlatko Crnković		(See also Serbo-Croatian, below)
Czech	1979	Hobit, aneb cesta tam a zase zpátky	František Vrba	Jiří Šalamoun	Prague: Odeon. In book translation credited for political reasons to Lubomír Dorůžka.
Danish	1969	Hobbitten, eller ud og hjem igen	Ida Nyrop Ludvigsen	J. R. R. Tolkien	Copenhagen: Gyldendal. 1969. No maps.
Danish	2012	Hobbitten, eller ud og hjem igen	Jakob Levinsen		Copenhagen: Gyldendal. 2012. ISBN 978-87-02-12852-9.
Dutch	1960	De Hobbit of daarheen en weer terug	Max Schuchart		Utrecht/Antwerpen: Het Spectrum. 1960. No maps.
Esperanto	2000	La Hobito aŭ Tien kaj Reen	Christopher Gledhill, poems translated by William Auld		Kaliningrad: Sezonoj. Rereleased in 2005. Runes are translated to Esperanto.
Esperanto	2015	La Hobito, aŭ, Tien kaj Reen	Christopher Gledhill, poems translated by William Auld		Portlaoise: Evertype, ISBN 978-1-78201-110-1 (hb), ISBN 978-1-78201-109-5 (pb). Contains both maps with place-names in Esperanto; the runes are translated into Esperanto. On the cup in the illustration "Conversations with Smaug" ('Konversacio kun Smaŭg') the text in Tengwar and initials in runes are translated into Esperanto.
Estonian	1977	Kääbik, ehk, Sinna ja tagasi	Lia Rajandi (prose and poems), Harald Rajamets (poems)	Maret Kernumees	Tallinn: Eesti raamat
Faroese	1990	Hobbin ella út og heim aftur	Axel Tórgarð		Hoyvík: Stíðin. Both maps translated into Faroese. The runic text was replaced with (Faroese) medieval dotted runes and translated into Faroese. Tolkien's pictures left as they were, Faroese translation added below.
Finnish	1973	Lohikäärmevuori, eli Erään hoppelin matka sinne ja takaisin	Risto Pitkänen	Tove Jansson (from 1962 Swedish edition)	Helsinki: Tammi
Finnish	1985	Hobitti eli Sinne ja takaisin	Kersti Juva	J. R. R. Tolkien	Helsinki: Werner Söderström. Later edition of 2003 illustrated by Tove Jansson (from 1962 Swedish edition) with her illustrations.
French	1969, 1976	Bilbo le Hobbit	Francis Ledoux	De Chica, in 1976 edition	Paris: Le Livre de Poche. 2002. ISBN 2-253-04941-7. Contains both maps with place-names in French; the runes remain in English.
French	2012	Le Hobbit	Daniel Lauzon		Paris: Christian Bourgois éditeur. 2012. ISBN 978-2-267-02401-2. Contains both maps with place-names in French; the runes are translated.
West Frisian	2009	De Hobbit	Anne Tjerk Popkema		Leeuwarden: Uitgeverij Elikser. 2009. ISBN 90-8954-112-8.
Gaelic	2025	“A' Hobat”	Moray Watson		
Galician	2000	Ó hobbit	Moisés R. Barcia		Vigo: Edicións Xerais de Galicia
Georgian	2002	ჰობიტი ანუ იქით და აქეთ (Hobitʼi anu ikit da aket)	Nino Bardzimishvili, poems translated by Tinatin Gogochashvili		Tbilisi: Otar Karalashvili. 2002. ISBN printed on the cover and in the book (99928-0-302-0) is invalid. Contains both maps with place-names in Georgian.
Georgian	2009	ჰობიტი (Hobitʼi)	Nika Samushia, poems translated by Tsitso Khotsuashvili.		Tbilisi: Bakur Sulakauri Publishing. 2009. ISBN 978-9941-403-41-5. Contains both maps with place-names in Georgian. John Howe's illustration on the cover.
German	1957	Kleiner Hobbit und der große Zauberer	Walter Scherf	Horus Engels	Recklinghausen: Paulus-Verlag. 1957.
German	1967, 1971	Der kleine Hobbit	Walter Scherf	Klaus Ensikat	Georg Bitter. 1971. Revised after the appearance of the Carroux translation of The Lord of the Rings to make the names match.
German	1998	Der Hobbit	Wolfgang Krege		Stuttgart: Klett-Cotta, ISBN 3-608-93805-2
Greek	1978	Το Χόμπιτ (To Hobit)	A. Gavrielide, Kh. Delegianne		Athens: Kedros, ISBN 960-04-0308-2
Hawaiian	2015	Ka Hopita, a i ʻole, I Laila a Hoʻi Hou mai	R. Keao NeSmith		Portlaoise: Evertype, ISBN 978-1-78201-092-0 (hb), ISBN 978-1-78201-091-3 (pb). Contains both maps with place-names in Hawaiian; the runes are translated into Hawaiian. On the cup in the illustration "Conversations with Smaug" ('Ke Kūkā ʻana me Smaug') the text in Tengwar and initials in runes are translated into Hawaiian.
Hebrew	1976	ההוביט (Ha-hobit)	משה הנעמי (Moshe Hana'ami)		
Hebrew	1977	ההוביט או לשם ובחזרה (Ha-hobit o lesham u'v'chazarah)		J. R. R. Tolkien	Ganei-Aviv: Zmora-Bitan (זמורה – ביתן). Contains no maps. Four Israeli combat pilots, held as prisoners of war in Egypt between 1970 and 1973, whiled away their time of captivity by translating "The Hobbit" to Hebrew from a book sent to one of them by family members, via the Red Cross. The Pilots' Translation was published in Tel-Aviv following their return, and many Israeli critics still consider it the better of the first two Hebrew translations.
Hebrew	2012	ההוביט (Ha-hobit)	יעל אכמון (Yael Achmon)		
Hungarian	1975	A babó	Tibor Szobotka, poems translated by István Tótfalusi	Tamás Szecskó	ISBN 963-11-0374-9 Reworked in 2006 under the title A hobbit – "Egyszer oda, aztán vissza" by Tamás Füzessy with the introduction and annotations of Douglas A. Anderson (translated by Zsuzsanna Ürmössy). (ISBN 963-539-515-9)
Hungarian	2006	A hobbit – Vagy: Oda-vissza	László Gy. Horváth, poems translated by Zsuzsa N. Kiss	Alan Lee	This translation was originally published in 2006 with a terminology consistent with that of the Ádám Réz/Árpád Göncz translation of The Lord of the Rings (A Gyűrűk Ura) (ISBN 963-07-8162-X). It uses the old Hungarian alphabet instead of English runes. After the revision of the Hungarian terminology of The Lord of the Rings in 2008, changes were also incorporated into this translation and was republished in 2011 without illustrations and with the English runes restored (ISBN 978-963-07-9336-0).
Icelandic	1978	Hobbitinn	Úlfur Ragnarsson and Karl Ágúst Úlfsson		Reykjavík: Almenna Bókafélagið
Icelandic	1997	Hobbitinn eða út og heim aftur	Þorsteinn Thorarensen		Reykjavík: Fjölvaútgáfan ISBN 9979-58-305-3
Indonesian	1977	Hobbit atau pergi dan kembali	Anton Adiwiyoto		Jakarta: Gramedia Pustaka Utama
Irish	2012	An Hobad, nó, Anonn agus Ar Ais Arís	Nicholas Williams		Cathair na Mart: Evertype, ISBN 978-1-904808-90-9 (hb), ISBN 978-1-78201-033-3 (pb). Contains both maps with place-names in Irish; the runes are translated into Irish. On the cup in the illustration "Conversations with Smaug" ('Ag Comhrá le Smóg') the text in Tengwar and initials in runes are translated into Irish.
Italian	1973	Lo hobbit, o la Riconquista del Tesoro	Elena Jeronimidis Conte		Milan: Adelphi Editions. ISBN 88-459-0688-4. Contains both maps with place-names in Italian; the runes are translated into Italian. Spelling of "Smaug" changed into "Smog"; the trolls are referred to as "Uomini Neri" ("Black Men"); "Carrock" translated as "Carroccia" (from the Italian "roccia", "rock").
Italian	2004	Lo Hobbit annotato; Lo Hobbit	Oronzo Cilli and Elena Jeronimidis Conte	Jemina Catlin	Milan: Bompiani. New translation, first published as Douglas A. Anderson's annotated edition (ISBN 88-452-3292-1; ISBN 978-88-452-7140-3) but later also as normal editions (illustrated by Alan Lee: ISBN 978-88-452-6834-2: ISBN 9788845274404). Paperback editions translate runes, hardback editions do not. Maps use translations from the Adelphi edition.
Japanese	1965	ホビットの冒険 (Hobitto no Bōken)	Teiji Seta (瀬田貞二)	Ryuichi Terashima	Tokyo: Iwanami Shoten. (Various editions). Character and place names derived from common English usage tend to be rendered into Japanese, while those invented by Tolkien or difficult to translate are often transliterated directly into katakana spellings. Runes on Thrór's map are left in English, but absent altogether from the title page. Terms used here carry over into the Japanese edition of The Lord of the Rings, translated by Teiji Seta and Akiko Tanaka.
Japanese	2012	新版 ホビット ゆきてかえりし物語 (Shinpan Hobitto Yukite Kaerishi Monogatari)	Shirō Yamamoto (山本史郎)	J. R. R. Tolkien	Tokyo: Hara Shobō. ISBN 978-4-562-04866-3 Translation of The Annotated Hobbit. Maps in Japanese. Tolkien's illustrations are used, with English captions. Notes by Douglas Anderson (in Japanese). Written in the polite -masu form.
Kazakh	2023	Хоббит немесе Барып-қайту (Хоббит немесе Барып-қайту)	А. Бозбаева (A. Bozbayeva)		Astana: Foliant (No ISBN).
Korean	1979	호비트 (Hobiteu)	김종철 (Kim Jong-cheol)		Yeoleum
Korean	1988	호비트 모험 (Hobiteu Moheom)	공덕용 (Kong Deok-yong)		Seoul: Dongsuh Press
Korean	1989	호비트의 모험 (Hobiteueui Moheom)	최윤정 (Choi Yun-jeong)		Seoul: Changjak-kwa-Bipyongsa. ISBN 89-364-4103-5, ISBN 89-364-4104-3
Korean	1991	꼬마 호비트의 모험 (Kkoma Hobiteueui Moheom)	이동진 (Yee Dong-jin)		Yeollin. ISBN 89-8210-091-1
Korean	1999	호비트 (Hobiteu)	김석희 (Kim Seok-hee)		Seoul: Sigongsa. ISBN 89-527-0513-0, ISBN 89-527-0514-9
Korean	2002	호빗 (Hobit)	이미애 (Yee Mi-ae)		Seoul: Ssiaseul Ppurineun Saram. ISBN 978-89-5637-107-8
Korean	2021	호빗 (Hobit)	이미애 (Yee Mi-ae)		Seoul: Arte. ISBN 978-89-5099-252-1
Latin	2012	Hobbitus ille aut illuc atque rursus retrorsum	Marc Walker		London: HarperCollins. ISBN 978-0-00-744521-9
Latvian	1991	Hobits jeb Turp un atpakaļ	Zane Rozenberga	Laima Eglīte	First edition published in 1991 (ISBN 5-410-00159-1), a large format hardcover with original illustrations. Notably, elves were pictured as having wings and greenish skin. Second edition was published in 2002 in soft cover (ISBN 9984-22-417-1) and contained traditional black and white illustrations drawn by J. R. R. Tolkien.
Lithuanian	1985	Hobitas, arba Ten ir atgal	Bronė Balčienė		
Lule Sámi	2023	Hobihtta, jali Dåhku ja máhttse	Are Tjihkkom		Drag: Tjihkkom almmudahka. ISBN 978-82-692239-9-6.
Luxembourgish	2002	Den Hobbit	Henry Wickens		Esch-Sauer: Op der Lay. ISBN 2-87967-099-3. Contains both maps with place-names in Luxembourgish; the runes are translated into Luxembourgish.
Macedonian	2005	Хобитот или до таму и назад (Hobitot ili do tamu i nazad)	Marija Todorova		Skopje: Feniks ISBN 9989-33-142-1
Marathi	2011	द हॉबिट	Meena Kinikar		Pune: Diamond Publications ISBN 978-81-8483-374-4
Moldavian	1987	Хоббитул (Hobbitul)	Aleksej Tsurkanu		Chişinău: Literatura artistike (translated from Russian)
Mongolian	2013	Хоббит (Hobbit)	Oyuntsetseg Jamsandorj	Ts. Baidy	Soyombo Printing. ISBN 978-99929-6-572-6 Privately published several times during 2nd decade of 21st century. No maps.
Mongolian	2016	Хоббит (Hobbit)	D. Oyunchimeg		Khökh Devter Printing. ISBN 99973-62-85-3 (978-99973-62-85-3 is given on back cover). Accompanied by Father Giles of Ham in the same volume.
Mongolian (Монгол)	2022	Хоббит: Алсад зорчсон тэмдэглэл (Hobbit: Alsad zorchson temdeglel)	B. Amarbayasgalan		Monsudar Printing. ISBN 978-9919-518-28-8 (official translation)
Norwegian (Bokmål)	1972	Hobbiten, eller fram og tilbake igjen	Finn Aasen and Oddrun Grønvik		Oslo: Tiden Norsk Forlag. ISBN 82-10-00747-5. Contains both maps with place-names in Norwegian; the runes are translated into Norwegian.
Norwegian (Bokmål)	1997	Hobbiten, eller Fram og tilbake igjen	Nils Ivar Agøy		Oslo: Tiden Norsk Forlag. ISBN 82-10-04300-5
Norwegian (Nynorsk)	2008	Hobbiten, eller Ditut og attende	Eilev Groven Myhren		Oslo: Tiden Norsk Forlag. ISBN 978-82-10-05038-1
Occitan	2018	Bilbon lo Hòbbit (o un anar tornar)	Sèrgi Viaule		Cressé: Editions des Regionalismes ISBN 978-2-82400917-9
Persian	2002	هابيت (Hābit)	فرزاد فربد (Farzad Farbud)		Tehran: Ketab-e Panjereh 2002 (١٣٨١). ISBN 964-7822-01-4.
Persian	2004	هابيت يا آنجا و بازگشت دوباره (Hābit yā ānjā va bāzgašt dobāre)	رضا عليزاده (Reza Alizadeh)		Tehran: Rowzaneh 2004 (١٣٨٣). ISBN 964-334-200-X. Contains both maps with place-names in Persian; the runes remain in English.
Polish	1960	Hobbit, czyli tam i z powrotem	Maria Skibniewska	Jan Mlodozoniec	Warsaw: Iskry.
Polish	1985	Hobbit, czyli tam i z powrotem	Maria Skibniewska		2nd Polish edition, revised translation
Polish	1997	Hobbit albo tam i z powrotem	Paulina Braiter		
Polish	2002	Hobbit, czyli tam i z powrotem	Andrzej Polkowski		
Portuguese-Portugal	1962	O Gnomo	Maria Isabel Morna Braga, Mário Braga; il. António Quadros	Antonio Quadros	Porto: Livraria Civilização Editora
Portuguese-Portugal	1985	O Hobbit	Fernanda Pinto Rodrigues		Mem Martins: Publicações Europa-América.
Portuguese-Brazil	1995	O Hobbit ou Lá e de Volta Outra Vez	Lenita Maria Rímoli Esteves		São Paulo: Martins Fontes.
Romanian	1975	O poveste cu un hobbit	Catinca Ralea, poems translated by Leon Levițchi	Livia Rusz	Bucharest: Editura Ion Creangă
Romansh (Sursilvan)	2024	Il Hobbit, ni Viadi ed in Retuorn	Not Battesta Soliva		Zurich: Ediziun Apart; maps translated into Sursilvan - the runes on Thrór's map read English, but the runic inscription are transcribed into Sursilvan in Preface
Russian	1976	Хоббит, или Туда и Обратно	Н. Рахманова (N. Rakhmanova)	Mikhail Belomlinsky	Leningrad: Detskaya Literatura.
Russian	2001	Хоббит, или Туда и Обратно	А.А. Грузберг (A.A. Gruzberg)	Е. Нитылкина (E. Nitylkina)	Ekaterinburg: Publishing house "Litur" (Издательство «ЛИТУР»).
Russian	1995	Хоббит, или Туда и Обратно	М. Каменкович, С. Степанов (M. Kamenkovich, S. Stepanov)		Saint Petersburg: Publishing house "Azbuka" (Издательство «Азбука»). Academically annotated edition.
Russian	2000	Хоббит, или Туда и Обратно	Валерия Маторина "В.А.М." (Valeria Matorina, "V.A.M.")	И. Панков (I. Pankov)	Moscow: Publishing house "EKSMO" (Издательство «ЭКСМО»).
Russian	2001	Хоббит, или Туда и Обратно	Л. Яхнин (L. Yakhnin)		Moscow: Publishing house "Alfa book" (Издательство «Алфа-книга»).
Russian	1991	Хоббит, или Туда и Обратно	З. Бобырь (Z. Bobyr')		Moscow: Publishing house "Molodaya Gvardiya" (Издательство «Молодая гвардия»).
Russian	2002	Хоббит	К. Королёв, В. Тихомиров (K. Korolev, V. Tikhomirov)		Moscow: Publishing house "Eksmo" (Издательство «Эксмо»).
Russian	2005	Хоббит, или Туда и Обратно (Khobbit, ili Tuda i Obratno)	Н. Прохорова, М. Виноградова (N. Prokhorova, M. Vinogradova)		Moscow: Publishing house "Milikon Servis" (Издательство «Миликон Сервис»).
Russian	2003	Хоббит, или Туда и Обратно (Khobbit, ili Tuda i Obratno)	И. Тогоева (I. Togoeva)		Moscow: Publishing house "Rosmen" (Издательство «РОСМЭН»).
Russian	2014	Хоббит (Khobbit)	В. Баканов, Е. Доброхотова-Майкова (V. Bakanov, E. Dobrokhotova-Maykova)		Moscow: Publishing house "AST Publishers" (Издательство «АСТ»).
Scottish Gaelic	2025	A' Hobat, no A-null 's Air Ais A-rithist	Moray Watson		Evertype
Serbo-Croatian	1975	Хобит или тамо и назад (Hobit ili tamo i nazad)	Meri and Milan Milišić		Belgrade: Nolit
Serbo-Croatian	1986	Хобит или тамо и назад (Hobit ili tamo i nazad)	Dusan Ogrizek	Mirna Pavlovec	Ljubljana: Mladinska Knjiga
Silesian	2023	Hobit, abo tam i nazŏd	Grzegorz Kulik, poems translated by Mirosław Syniawa		Contains both map with place-names in Silesian. The characters' names are also in Silesian
Slovak	1973	Hobbiti	Viktor Krupa (prose), Jana Šimulčíková (poetry)	Naďa Rappensbergerová	Bratislava: Slovenský spisovateľ
Slovak	2002	Hobbit	Otakar Kořínek		Bratislava: Slovart
Slovene	1986	Hobit ali Tja in spet nazaj	Dušan Ogrizek		Ljubljana: Mladinska knjiga
Sorbian	2012	Hobit	Edward Wornar		Leipzig: Institut za Sorabistiku Lipšćanskeje University. ISBN 978-1-4716-7712-0
Spanish (Argentina)	1964	El hobito	Teresa Sánchez Cuevas		Buenos Aires: Fabril Editora. Its history (in Spanish).
Spanish (Spain)	1982	El hobbit	Manuel Figueroa		Barcelona: Ediciones Minotauro. ISBN 84-450-7141-6. Contains only Thrór's map with place-names in Spanish; the runes remain in English.
Swedish	1947	Hompen eller En resa Dit och Tillbaks igen	Tore Zetterholm	Tor-björn Zetterholm (internal); Charles Sjöblom (cover, maps)	Stockholm: Kooperativa Förbundets Bokförlag. First translation of any work by Tolkien; in Letter 239 (20 July 1962) he called it "bad", disliking Zetterholm's Hompen to translate "The Hobbit", and the illustrations "ghastly".
Swedish	1962	Bilbo – En hobbits äventyr	Britt G. Hallqvist	Tove Jansson	Stockholm: Rabén & Sjögren
Swedish	2007	Hobbiten eller bort och hem igen	Erik Andersson		Stockholm: Norstedts ISBN 978-91-1-301648-1 (green cover) or ISBN 978-91-1-301765-5
Thai	2002	เดอะฮอบบิท (Dexa ḥ xb bith)	สุดจิต ภิญโญยิ่ง (Sutjit Phin-yo-ying)		
Turkish	1996	Hobbit	Esra Uzun		
Turkish	2007	Hobbit	Gamze Sarı		ISBN 978-975-273-373-2, Publisher: İthaki Yayınları, Published: İstanbul, August 2007, Pages: 425
Ukrainian	1985	Гобiт, або Мандрiвка за Iмлистi гори (Hobit, abo Mandrivka za Imlysti hory)	O. Mokrovolskyi	Mykhaila Bilomlyns'koho	Kyiv: Veselka
Ukrainian	2007	Гобiт, або Туди i звiдти (Hobit, abo Tudy i zvidty)	Olena O'Lir		Lviv: Astrolabia, ISBN 978-966-8657-22-1
Ukrainian	2021	Гобiт, або Мандрiвка за Iмлистi гори (Hobit, abo Mandrivka za Imlysti hory)	O. Mokrovolskyi		Lviv: Astrolabia, ISBN 978-617-664-242-8, Jubilee (35th Anniversary Edition)
Vietnamese	2003				Vietnamese version already completed in 2002 but publishing cancelled. This version leaked onto the Internet in 2003.
Vietnamese	2009	Hobbit ra đi và trở về	Đinh Thị Hương		Hanoi: Thong Tin, no ISBN, EAN-13 8935077068955, maps with placenames in Vietnamese
Vietnamese	2010	anh chàng Hobbit	Nguyên Tâm		Hanoi: Nhã Nam, no ISBN, maps with placenames in Vietnamese
Welsh	2024	Yr Hobyd, neu, Yno ac Yn Ôl	Adam Pearce		Melin Bapur, ISBN 978-1-917237-15-4. Contains both maps with place-names in Welsh. The runes are replaced with Coelbren y Beirdd.
Yiddish	2012	דער האָביט (Der Hobit)	Barry Goldstein בעריש גאָלדשטײן		ISBN 978-1-4811-7230-1
Yiddish	2015	Der Hobit, oder, Ahin un Vider Tsurik	Barry Goldstein		Portlaoise: Evertype, ISBN 978-1-78201-120-0 (hb), ISBN 978-1-78201-119-4 (pb). Published in romanised Yiddish. Contains both maps with place-names in Yiddish; the runes are translated into Yiddish. On the cup in the illustration "Conversations with Smaug" ('Shmuesen mit Smaug') the text in Tengwar and initials in runes are translated into Yiddish.

== See also ==
- English-language editions of The Hobbit
- List of translations of The Lord of the Rings

== Sources ==
- Carpenter, Humphrey, ed. (2023) [1981]. The Letters of J. R. R. Tolkien: Revised and Expanded Edition. New York: HarperCollins. ISBN 978-0-35-865298-4.
