= Translating The Lord of the Rings =

Literary analysis

J. R. R. Tolkien's The Lord of the Rings has been translated, with varying degrees of success, into dozens of languages from the original English. He was critical of some early versions, and made efforts to improve translation by providing a detailed "Guide to the Names in The Lord of the Rings", alongside an appendix "On Translation" in the book itself.

The complexity of the book, the nature of Tolkien's prose style with its archaisms, and the many names of characters and places combine to make translation into any language a challenge. A specific difficulty is the elaborate relationship between some of the real and invented languages used in the book. Westron, the common speech of Middle-earth, is "translated" as modern English; this stands in relation to Rohirric, an archaic language, which is represented by Old English, and the language of Dale, translated as Old Norse. The three real languages are related. The scholar of literature Thomas Honegger gives possible solutions for this in French and German, but suggests that the small amount of Old English is probably best left untranslated.

Tolkien, an expert in Germanic philology, scrutinized those that were under preparation during his lifetime, and made comments on early translations that reflect both the translation process and his work. To aid translators, and because he was unhappy with the work of early translators such as Åke Ohlmarks with his Swedish version, Tolkien wrote his "Guide" in 1967; it was released publicly in 1975 in A Tolkien Compass, and again, retranscribed, in the 2005 book The Lord of the Rings: A Reader's Companion.

Linguists have examined translations into several languages, noting the specific difficulties in each case, and the choices and errors that translators have made. Later versions in each language have benefited from the choice of adapting and correcting early versions, or of starting afresh. For instance, Margaret Carroux's careful German version was criticised by Wolfgang Krege, who made a new translation, for using a similar linguistic style for the speech of both elves and hobbits, despite the marked differences in the original, while Luis Domènech rendered the working class hobbits' non-standard English into accurate but standard Spanish. Translations have sometimes adopted a domesticating approach: for instance, the first Russian version to be printed substitutes secret police and armed escort for Tolkien's far gentler English policemen.

== Context ==
J. R. R. Tolkien (1892–1973) was an English Roman Catholic writer, poet, philologist, and academic, best known as the author of the high fantasy works The Hobbit and The Lord of the Rings.

The Lord of the Rings was published in 1954–1955; it was awarded the International Fantasy Award in 1957. The publication of the Ace Books and Ballantine paperbacks in the United States helped it to become immensely popular with a new generation in the 1960s. It has remained so ever since, judged by both sales and reader surveys.

== Challenges to translation ==
=== Relationships between Tolkien's purportedly translated languages ===
Because The Lord of the Rings purports to be a translation of the fictitious Red Book of Westmarch, with the English language in the translation representing the Westron of the original, translators need to imitate the complex interplay between English and non-English (such as Elvish) nomenclature in the book. An additional difficulty is the presence of proper names in Old English and Old Norse. Tolkien chose to use Old English for names and some words of the Rohirrim, for example, "Théoden", King of Rohan: his name is simply a transliteration of Old English þēoden, "king". Similarly, he used Old Norse for "external" names of his Dwarves, such as "Thorin Oakenshield": both Þorinn and Eikinskjaldi are Dwarf-names from the Völuspá.

Tolkien accidentally created a linguistic puzzle by using three different pseudo-translated Germanic languages for peoples in his story, namely English, Old Norse, and Old English.

The relation of such names to English, within the history of English, and of the Germanic languages more generally, is intended to reflect the relation of the purported "original" names to Westron. The Tolkien scholar Tom Shippey states that Tolkien began with the words and names that he wanted, and invented parts of Middle-earth to resolve the linguistic puzzle he had accidentally created by using different European languages for those of peoples in his legendarium. The relationships cannot easily be replicated in translations of The Lord of the Rings.

Tolkien uses the mapping of Old English to Modern English to represent the mapping of the constructed languages Rohirric to Westron. Such subtlety is hard to replicate in translation.

Thomas Honegger suggests how the language nexus might be translated into French:

Honegger's proposal for translating the language nexus into French
Middle-earth language	Language for French translations	Notes
Of the Shire	Modern French	lingua franca spoken across Middle-earth except by "a few secluded folk" as in Lothlórien (and "little and ill by Orcs")
Of Dale	Picard	"used by Dwarves of that region"
Of Rohan	Medieval Vulgar Latin	ancestor of French

Honegger notes that while this type of solution works linguistically, it cannot hope to capture cultural aspects. The people of Rohan, the Rohirrim, speak a Mercian dialect of Old English, and their culture is Anglo-Saxon, despite Tolkien's denial of this in "On Translation". Medieval Latin does nothing to suggest Mercian Anglo-Saxon culture. Honegger suggests that in consequence, the best answer is probably to leave the Old English names and quoted speech untranslated, noting that Tolkien's "Guide to the Names" seems to concur with this approach. He comments, however, that "a bit of linguistic adaptation to the target language" is sometimes feasible. Éomer could perfectly well, Honegger proposes, shout his greeting to the King in German translation not as "Westu, Théoden, hal!" but as "Sî dû, Thioden, heil!" in Old High German.

=== Archaism ===
Another difficulty for translators is Tolkien's use of archaism. Allan Turner gives the example of fronting, where Tolkien puts the object at the start of a sentence rather than after the verb: "Weapons they have laid at your doors". Turner points out that this cannot be done in French, while in German it remains a common construction and doesn't give an archaic effect.

=== Idiolect ===
A specific challenge is Gollum's distinctive idiolect, with its simple but ungrammatical syntax and its "schizophrenic" character. His oft-repeated keyword "precious" means both the One Ring and Gollum himself. His use of pronouns is non-standard: he uses both "I" and "We" to mean himself, and when Gollum talks to his alter ego Sméagol, "You" also effectively means himself. Gollum's incorrect plurals, subject-verb agreement, and verb tenses impact translation. In Chinese, for example, the trend is to ignore Gollum's excessive pluralisation (as in his "pocketses" or "goblinses").

== Translations in dialogue with Tolkien ==
The first translations of The Lord of the Rings to be prepared were those in Dutch (1956–1957, Max Schuchart) and Swedish (1959–1960, Åke Ohlmarks). Both took considerable liberties with their material, apparent already from the rendition of the title, In de Ban van de Ring "Under the Spell of the Ring" and Härskarringen "The Ruling Ring", respectively.

In both the Dutch and the Swedish cases, Tolkien objected strongly while the translations were in progress, especially about the adaptation of proper names. Despite lengthy correspondence, Tolkien did not succeed in convincing the Dutch translator of his objections, and was similarly frustrated in the Swedish case.

=== Dutch (Schuchart) 1956–1957 ===
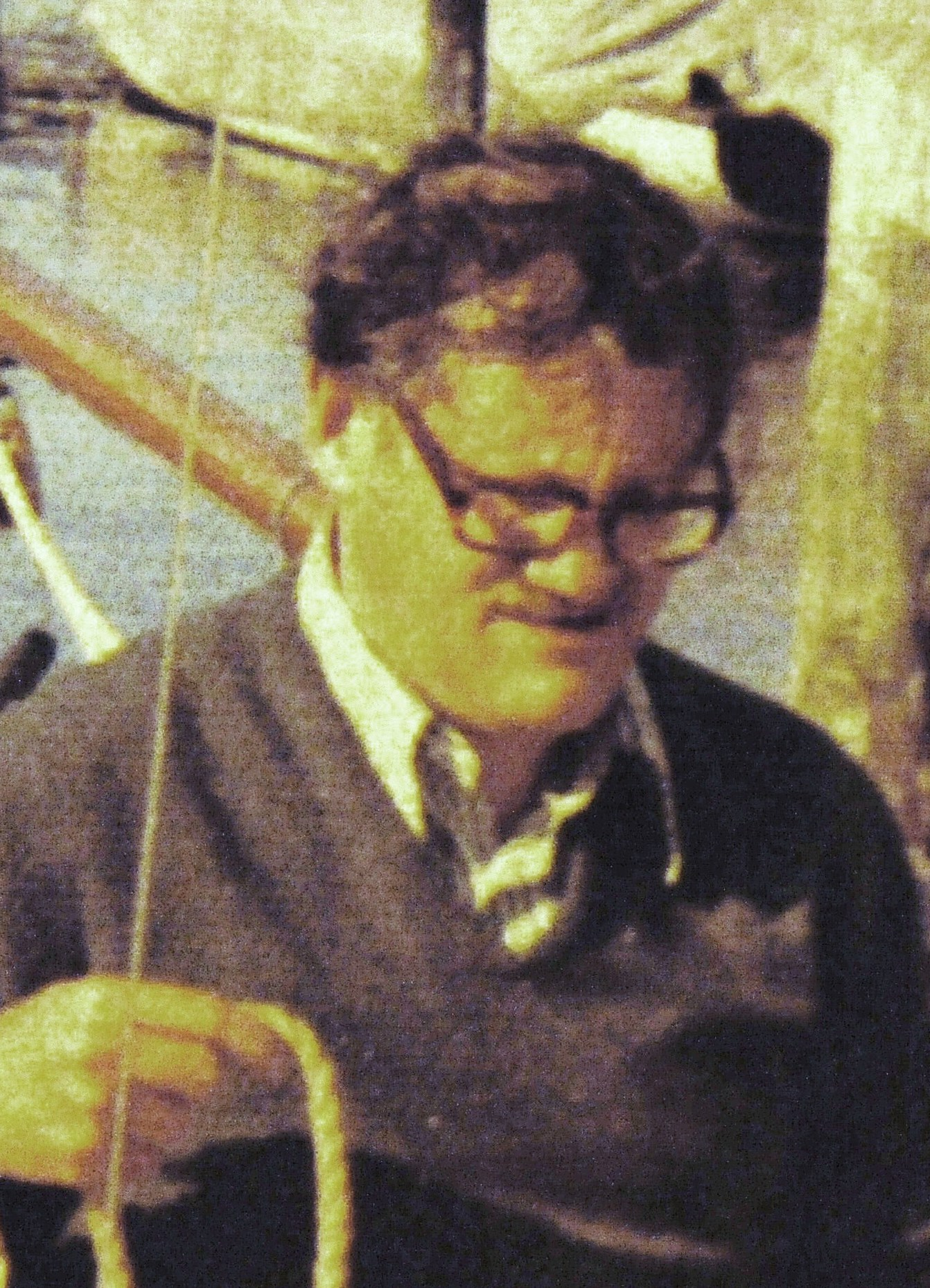
Max Schuchart made a Dutch translation that Tolkien disliked.

On Max Schuchart's Dutch version, In de Ban van de Ring, Tolkien wrote

In principle I object as strongly as is possible to the 'translation' of the nomenclature at all (even by a competent person). I wonder why a translator should think himself called on or entitled to do any such thing. That this is an 'imaginary' world does not give him any right to remodel it according to his fancy, even if he could in a few months create a new coherent structure which it took me years to work out. [...] May I say at once that I will not tolerate any similar tinkering with the personal nomenclature. Nor with the name/word Hobbit.

— Letters, #190 to Rayner Unwin, 3 July 1956

The Rhyme of the Rings
Tolkien
The Lord of the Rings

Three Rings for the Elven-kings under the sky,
Seven for the Dwarf-lords in their halls of stone,
Nine for Mortal Men doomed to die,
One Ring to rule them all, One Ring to find them,
One Ring to bring them all and in the darkness bind them
In the Land of Mordor where the Shadows lie.

Schuchart
In de ban van de Ring
"Under the Spell of the Ring"

Drie ringen voor de elfenkoningen op aard',
Zeven voor de dwergvorsten in hun zalen schoon,
Negen voor de mensen, die de dood niet spaart,
Eén voor de Zwarte Heerser op zijn zwarte troon
In Mordor, waar de schimmen zijn.

Back-translation

Three rings for the elven-kings of earth,
Seven for the dwarf princes in their beautiful halls,
Nine for the men whom death does not spare,
One for the Black Ruler on his black throne
In Mordor, where the shadows are.

Despite this, the Dutch version stayed largely unchanged except for the names of certain characters. Further, it led to the only occasion on which Tolkien agreed to be the guest of honour at a "Hobbit-maaltijd", in Rotterdam in March 1958, at the invitation of Cees Oubouter of the bookseller Voorhoeve & Dietrich. Schuchart's translation remains, as of 2008, the only authorized translation in Dutch; an unauthorized translation was made by E.J. Mensink-van Warmelo in the late 1970s.

Schuchart's translation has been revised repeatedly, such as in 1965 and 2003 to correct mistakes; and it was revised in 1997 to modernise its vocabulary. Modernisations included losing much of Schuchart's variation of style to suit different speakers such as Elrond and Aragorn in "The Council of Elrond". Since Dutch still inverts word order, Elrond's inversions such as "Fruitless did I call the victory of the Last Alliance?" do not give an archaic effect when translated. Instead, an archaic feeling can be conveyed by word choice, such as Schuchart's 1956 viel for "fell" (meaning "was killed"); the 1997 revision used the plainer sneuvelde. As another example, Tolkien's archaising "ere" (meaning "before") was the cognate eer in 1956, but this was replaced in 1997.

=== Swedish (Ohlmarks) 1959–1961 ===
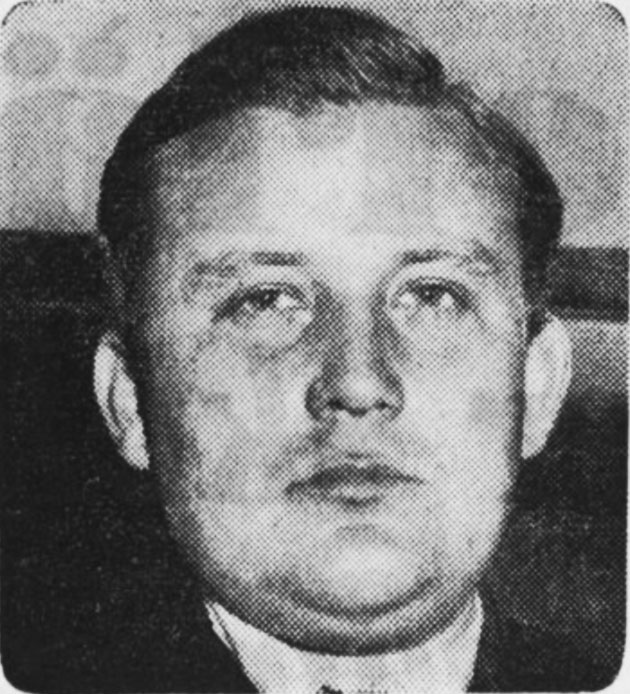
Tolkien and many readers objected to Åke Ohlmarks's Swedish translation.

Åke Ohlmarks was a prolific translator, who had produced Swedish versions of Shakespeare, Dante and the Qur'an, as well as works in Old Norse. His experience with Old Norse recommended him to the publisher Gebers Förlag, and enabled him to find suitable old Swedish words for some of Tolkien's terms: the Tolkien scholar Beregond praises his choices of alv for "elf", and of väströna (modelled on norröna, North Sea coast people of the heroic age) for "Westron". On the other hand, Beregond notes, Ohlmarks failed to use harg for the cognate "harrow" in Dunharrow, or skog for "shaw" in Trollshaws, things that "should have been obvious".

A much more widespread issue was Ohlmarks's "propensity for embroidering every description". Thus, Beregond notes, Tolkien calls Bilbo's wealth "a legend"; Ohlmarks went beyond Tolkien's text to assert that "his travels are sägonomsusade ('legendary') as well."

Tolkien intensely disliked Ohlmarks' translation of The Lord of the Rings (which Ohlmarks named Härskarringen, 'The Ruling Ring'), more so even than Schuchart's Dutch translation. Ohlmarks' translation remained the only one available in Swedish for forty years, and until his death in 1984, Ohlmarks remained impervious to the numerous complaints and calls for revision from readers.

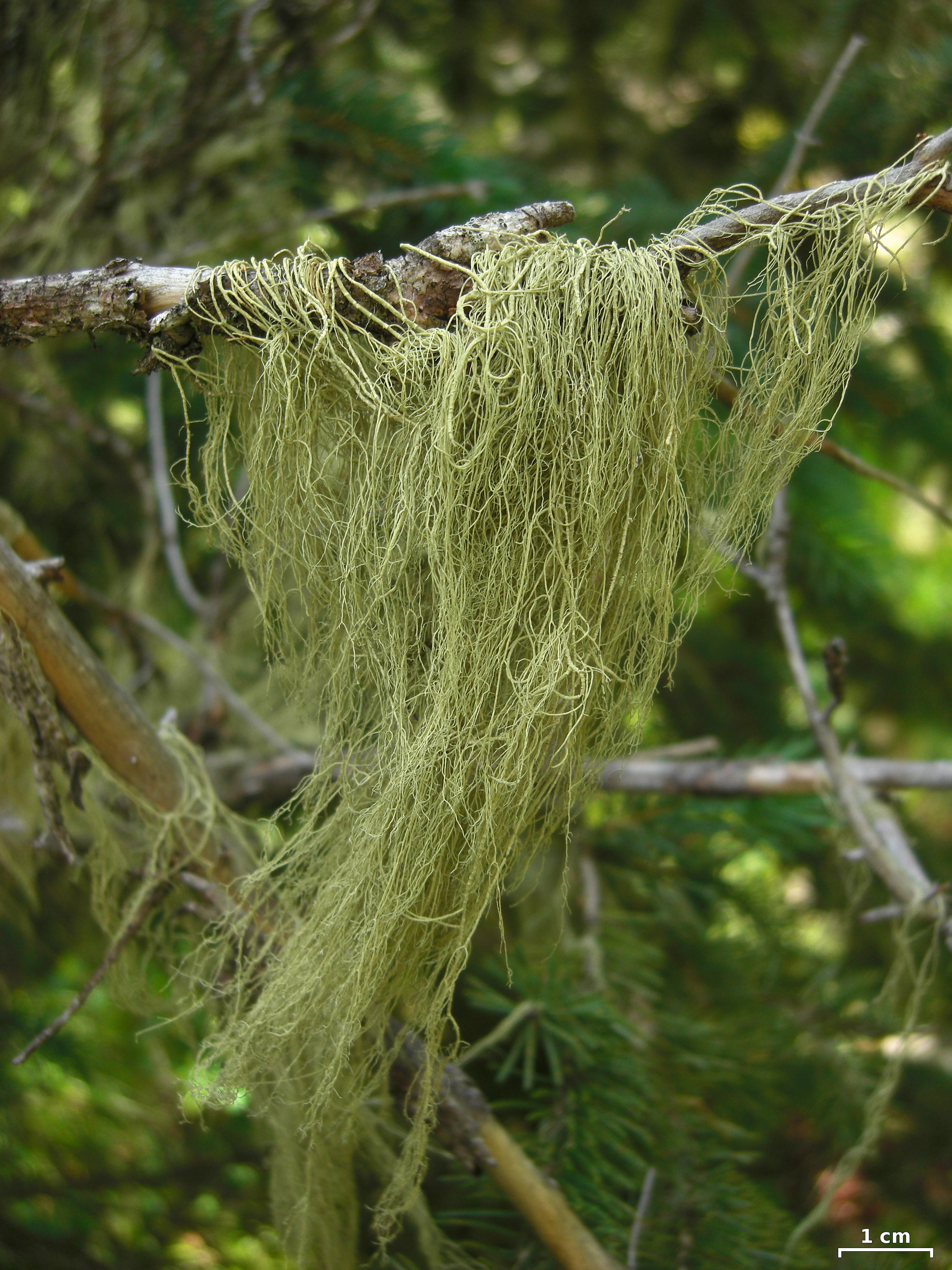
Ohlmarks rendered "Treebeard" as the Swedish for "Lichenbeard". Beard lichen illustrated

After The Silmarillion was published in 1977, Christopher Tolkien consented to a Swedish translation only on condition that Ohlmarks have nothing to do with it. After a fire at his home in 1982, Ohlmarks incoherently charged Tolkien fans with arson, and subsequently published the book Tolkien och den svarta magin ("Tolkien and Black Magic"), attempting to connect Tolkien with black magic and Nazism.

Ohlmarks' translation was superseded only in 2005, by a plainer and more concise translation by Erik Andersson, written in reaction to it. Where Ohlmarks had rendered Rivendell as Vattnadal ("Waterdale"), or Treebeard as Lavskägge ("Lichenbeard"), Andersson used Riftedal and Trädskägge, far closer in meaning to Tolkien. Andersson cuts down Ohlmarks's name for Mount Doom, Domedagsberget ("Judgement Day Mountain") to the simpler and more direct translation Domberget. The poems in Andersson's version were translated by Lotta Olsson. She was bemused by the demands of young Swedish Tolkien fans to keep the names as they were (in Ohlmarks's version) – or else to use the original English names. Andersson rather agreed, but noted that names like "Old Forest" plainly needed to be translated, and that Tolkien had explicitly said so.

The work was retitled Ringarnas herre, "Lord of the Rings", making it, like the text, closer to the English original.

A sample of Ohlmarks and Andersson's translations
Tolkien	Ohlmarks 1959–1961	Andersson and Olsson 2005
Indeed, few Hobbits had ever seen or sailed upon the Sea, and fewer still had ever returned to report it.	Det var ju så, att sjömanslivet alls inte passade samman med hobernas allmänna läggning. Ytterst få hade sett havet, ännu färre befarit det, och av dem som verkligen seglat hade blott ett försvinnande fåtal återvänt och kunnat berätta om vad de upplevat.	Över huvud taget var det få hobbitar som hade sett havet eller färdats på det, och ännu färre hade återvänt och berättat om det.
(Translation of samples:)	It was the case that a sailor's life did not fit in at all with the general disposition of the hobbits. Extremely few had seen the sea, even fewer had sailed it, and of those who really had sailed, only a vanishingly few had returned and been able to tell what they had experienced.	Indeed there were few hobbits who had seen the sea or travelled on it, and even fewer had returned and told about it.

== Tolkien's "Guide to the Names in The Lord of the Rings" ==
Frustrated by his experience with Schuchart's Dutch and Ohlmarks's Swedish translations, Tolkien asked that

when any further translations are negotiated, [...] I should be consulted at an early stage. [...] After all, I charge nothing, and can save a translator a good deal of time and puzzling; and if consulted at an early stage my remarks will appear far less in the light of peevish criticisms.

— Letter 204 to Rayner Unwin, 7 December 1957

With a view to the planned Danish translation, Tolkien decided to take action in order to avoid similar disappointments in the future. On 2 January 1967, he wrote to Otto B. Lindhardt, of the Danish publisher Gyldendals Bibliotek:

I have therefore recently been engaged in making, and have nearly completed, a commentary on the names in this story, with explanations and suggestions for the use of a translator, having especially in mind Danish and German.

— Tolkien-George Allen & Unwin archive, HarperCollins, cited after Hammond and Scull 2005

Photocopies were sent to translators of The Lord of the Rings by Allen & Unwin from 1967. The first translations to profit from the guideline, and the only ones that did so to appear in Tolkien's lifetime, were those into Danish (Ida Nyrop Ludvigsen) and German (Margaret Carroux); both appeared in 1972. After Tolkien's death, it was published as "Guide to the Names in The Lord of the Rings", edited by Christopher Tolkien in Jared Lobdell's 1975 A Tolkien Compass. In 2005, Wayne G. Hammond and Christina Scull newly transcribed and slightly edited Tolkien's typescript; they re-published it under the title of Nomenclature of The Lord of the Rings in their book The Lord of the Rings: A Reader's Companion.

An entry in the "Guide to the Names"
Crickhollow	A place-name in Buckland. It is meant to be taken as composed of an obsolete element + the known word hollow. The -hollow (a small depression in the ground) can be translated by sense, the crick- retained (in the spelling of the language of translation).

Tolkien uses the abbreviations CS for "Common Speech, in original text represented by English", and LT for the target language of the translation. His approach is the prescription that if in doubt, a proper name should not be altered but left as it appears in the English original:

All names not in the following list should be left entirely unchanged in any language used in translation (LT), except that inflexional s, es should be rendered according to the grammar of the LT.

The names in English form, such as Dead Marshes, should in Tolkien's view be translated straightforwardly, while the names in Elvish should be left unchanged. The difficult cases are those names where

the author [Tolkien], acting as translator of Elvish names already devised and used in this book or elsewhere, has taken pains to produce a CS name that is both a translation and also (to English ears) a euphonious name of familiar English style, even if it does not actually occur in England.

Examples are Rivendell, the translation of Sindarin Imladris "Glen of the Cleft", and Westernesse, the translation of Númenor. The list gives suggestions for some "old, obsolescent, or dialectal words in the Scandinavian and German languages".

== Translations in dialogue with Tolkien and his "Guide to Names" ==
=== Italian (Alliata) 1967 ===
The first Italian version, initially of The Fellowship of the Ring only, by Vittoria Alliata di Villafranca, aged only 17 at the time, was brought out by Mario Ubaldini's Edizione Astrolabio in 1967. She studiously followed Tolkien's Guide, and chose to begin with the appendices, so as to gain a deeper understanding of the book. As for her approach to translating names, she translated (rather than renamed or transliterated) Sackville-Baggins as Borsi-Sacconi ("Bags-Sacks"). For terms that seemed "exotic", she "adopted Greek or even Arabic etymologies; if it had to be familiar or evocative, Latin or Italian etymologies: always, however, [I sought to create] Italian origins that were plausible". Alliata stated that Ubaldini sent the first pages of her translation to Tolkien. Tolkien seems to have asked for an opinion on the sample, as he wrote in a letter that "someone ... whose opinion he respects" had praised the translation. The translation lost some of the "refined style" of Tolkien's writing, but it was largely "accurate and faithful" to the original. The attempt to market it was unsuccessful, and the volume sold only some hundreds of copies, leading Ubaldini to abandon the project. The other two volumes of Alliata's translation were eventually brought out by other publishers.

A second Italian translation, made by Ottavio Fatica, was published by Bompiani in 2019 to 2020. Fatica had access to Alliata's text; she became offended by his remarks about her translation, and a legal dispute followed. The Tolkien scholar Roberto Arduini commended Fatica's version, stating that it cast "a generous, exuberant, playful spell". The literary critic Cesare Catà on the other hand compared it unfavourably to Alliata's version, saying that it was dry and humdrum, to be categorised not as epic but as Young Adult fiction.

Marcantonio Savelli identifies two "recurring trends" in Fatica's version, namely an unjustifiably "low and strongly colloquial tone" not reflecting the original, and the equally unjustifiable use (in his view) of modern technical terms. Among numerous examples that he analyses, Savelli objects, for instance, to the phrase organizzate attività di sussistenza ("organized subsistence activities"), which in his view is far too modern and technical for the context: The Italian Association for Tolkien Studies comments that Fatica's version has triggered years of debate between supporters of the two versions, but that this has had the merit of getting people in Italy to think about Tolkien's style of writing.

Two Italian versions of The Lord of the Rings
Chapter	Tolkien	Alliata 1967	Fatica 2019–2020
"Concerning Hobbits"	...and there in that pleasant corner of the world they plied their well-ordered business of living...	Conducevano in quel ridente angolo della terra una vita talmente ordinata e bene organizzata...	...e in quell'ameno angolo di mondo svolgevano le loro ben organizzate attività di sussistenza...
"A Long-Expected Party"	At ninety-nine they began to call him well-preserved.	A novantanove incominciarono a dire che si manteneva bene.	A novantanove anni iniziarono a definirlo ben conservato.
"Three is Company"	Touched with gold and red, the autumn trees seemed to be sailing rootless in a shadowy sea.	Gli alberi autunnali, pennellati d'oro e di carminio, parevano navigare senza radici in un mare d'ombra.	Pittati d'oro e rosso, gli alberi autunnali sembravano nuotare in un mare umbratile.
"The Mirror of Galadriel"	A lord of wisdom throned he sat	In sapienza ed in saggezza egli era signore	Saggio vecchio intronizzato

Savelli comments that ben conservato is an over-literal rendering into an Italian phrase that never refers to a person. He is especially critical Fatica's use of "the adjective pittati" (a plural form, roughly meaning "painted"). In his view, this "grammatically incorrect colloquial term ... deserves to be highlighted as one of the most cacophonous mistakes in the entire translation. It is a term that a reasonably well-educated Italian person would avoid even in spoken language, let alone in a written text of any nature." As for Fatica's vecchio intronizzato, Savelli writes that vecchio is disrespectful where a term of praise is required by the context, while intronizzato is both technical and obscure, and wholly unsuitable for the poetic context.

Francesca Raffi writes that the two Italian translations, made many years apart, differ because of the changed sociocultural context, with changed conceptions of Tolkien's writing and of how visible a translator ought to be. These give the translated text "a new image, new meanings, and a new reception."

Savelli concludes that Fatica may have been attempting to transform Tolkien's text into something else to make it "more 'digestible' by detractors of the Fantasy genre" or of Tolkien's "'unfashionable' reactionary mentality", so as to create "a modernized Tolkien" to replace the "'medieval' one".

=== German (Carroux) 1969–1970 ===
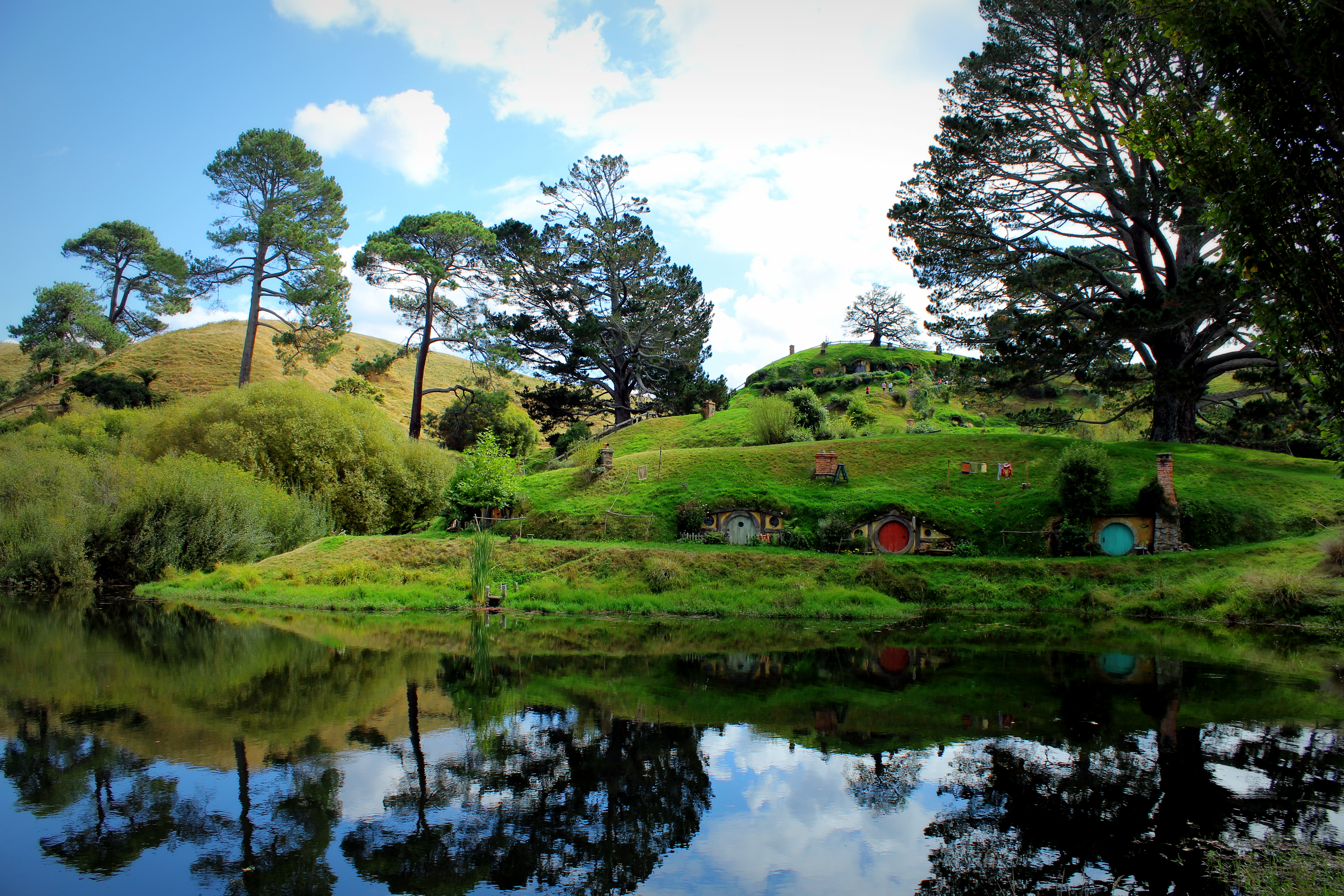
"The Shire" proved awkward to translate into German, as the obvious historic word Gau had, as Tolkien suspected, become associated with its usage under the Nazis. Carroux invented a compound word instead.

Tolkien's "Guide to the Names in The Lord of the Rings", gained him a larger influence on translations into other Germanic languages, namely Danish and German. The Frankfurt-based Margaret Carroux qualified for the German version published by Klett-Cotta on the basis of her translation of Tolkien's short story "Leaf by Niggle", that she had made solely to give him a sample of her work. In her preparation for The Lord of the Rings (Der Herr der Ringe), unlike Schluchart and Ohlmarks, Carroux even visited Tolkien in Oxford in December 1967 with a suitcase full of his published works and questions about them. Tolkien and his wife both had a cold at the time, resulting in a "chilly" and inhospitable meeting, with Tolkien "harsh", "taciturn" and "severely ill". Later correspondence with Carroux was much more encouraging; Tolkien was delighted with Carroux's work, with the sole exception of the poems and songs. Carroux had had them translated by the poet Ebba-Margareta von Freymann, but was unsatisfied by the result.

On several instances Carroux departed from the literal, e.g. for the Shire. Tolkien endorsed the Gouw of the Dutch version and remarked that German Gau "seems to me suitable in Ger., unless its recent use in regional reorganization under Hitler has spoilt this very old word." Carroux decided that this was indeed the case, and opted for the more artificial compound Auenland "meadow-land" instead. The Tolkien scholar Susanne Stopfel describes the translation as a whole as treating its source with "enormous respect".

In 2000, Klett-Cotta published a new translation by Wolfgang Krege, to accompany Carroux's. It focuses more on the differences in linguistic style that Tolkien employed to set apart the more biblical prose and the high style of elvish and human 'nobility' from the more colloquial 1940s English spoken by the Hobbits, something that Krege thought Carroux's more unified version was lacking; the poems were unchanged. The translation met a mixed reception; critics felt that he took too many liberties in modernising the language of the Hobbits into the linguistic style of late 1990s German. They commented that this subverted the epic style of the narrative, departing from Tolkien. The 2012 edition of Krege has reverted the most controversial of his decisions. The linguist Rainer Nagel contrasts the versions, writing that Krege corrects many errors in Carroux, but "often overshoots its target of modernising" as Krege seeks to "assimilat[e]" the text into a style unsuitable for Tolkien, creating a "translator-centred approach".

Nagel's comparison of Carroux's and Krege's translations
Author, translators	Tolkien	Carroux 1969–1970	Krege 2000
Versions	[Galadriel:] 'Would not that have been a noble deed to set to the credit of his Ring, if I had taken it by force or fear from my guest?'	'Würde das nicht eine edle Tat gewesen sein, die dem Einfluß seines Ringes zuzuschreiben wäre, wenn ich ihn meinem Gast mit Gewalt oder unter Drohungen abgenommen hätte?'	'Wäre es nicht ein schöner Beweis für des Ringes Kraft, wenn ich ihn mit Gewalt oder List meinem Gast abnähme?'
Back-translations	———	'Would that not be a noble deed done, which would be attributable to the influence of his Ring, if I had taken it from my guest with force or under threat?'	'Would that not be good proof of the Ring's power, if I took it from my guest by force or cunning?'
Nagel's comments	Uses "present perfect subjunctive"	Closely mirrors Tolkien's grammar and syntax, "making for somewhat hard reading"	"Syntactic simplification"

=== Icelandic ===
Tolkien did not live to see an Icelandic version of his novel, but in 1973 he told Ungfrú Aðalsteinsdottir that he was delighted she was working on one. He stated that he "had long hoped" for such a thing, as he felt that the language "would fit it better than any other I have any adequate knowledge of".

== Other translations ==
=== French (Ledoux) 1972–73 ===
The first French translation came out in 1972–73: Francis Ledoux's Le Seigneur des Anneaux, published by Christian Bourgois. Tolkien was largely unknown to French readers at the time: Bilbo le Hobbit had only appeared in 1969. Even the fantasy genre was poorly understood: fantaisie translates to "whim or fancy", while The Lord of the Rings is not fantastique, fantastical, Ferré insists, but merveilleux, full of wonders.

The French Tolkienist Vincent Ferré and colleagues, noting Tolkien's words in "On Translating Beowulf" that "therein lies the unrecapturable magic of ancient English verse ...: profound feeling, and poignant vision, filled with the beauty and mortality of the world, are aroused by brief phrases, light touches, short words resounding like harp-strings sharply plucked." Ferré comments that The Lord of the Rings is so much like Beowulf that its translation is forbiddingly difficult.

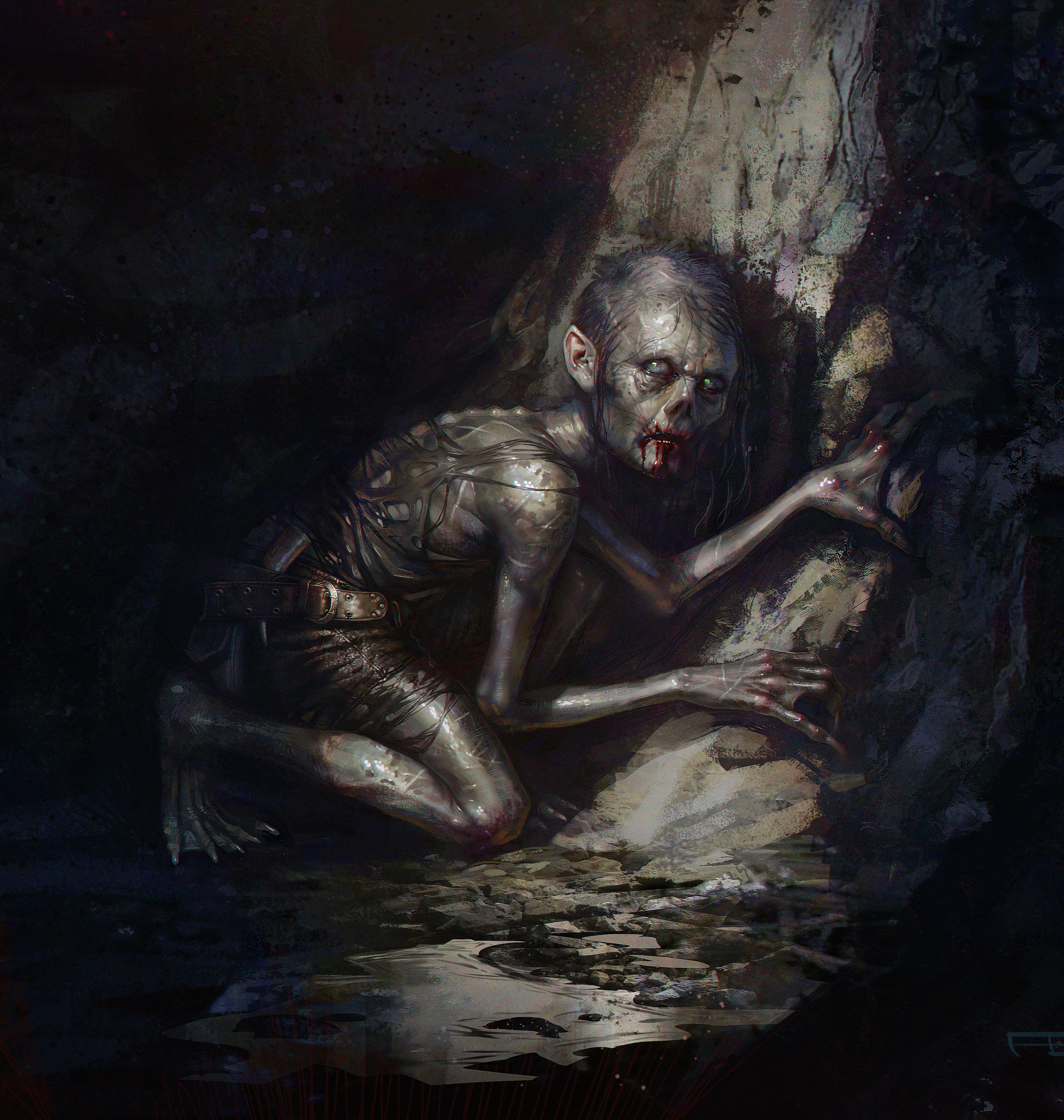
Francis Ledoux's translation "diminishes the peculiarities" of Gollum's distinctive style of speech. Painting of Gollum by Frederic Bennet, 2014

In Ferré's view, Ledoux, a skilful translator, had been a little incautious in some of his choices, such as on matters of race. He used the French word race which is already a pejorative. He chose noiraud, "a very dark-skinned person", for Tolkien's "black-like" and again for Tolkien's "black chap", but the hobbits concerned had seen only the Black Rider's clothing. Ferré writes that un type en noir, indicating only that the clothing was black, would have been better. A generation later, French far-right readers might, Ferré comments, read a wholly unintended meaning into the text. Ledoux makes another mistake, in Ferré's view, in explicitly mentioning God where Tolkien carefully avoids doing that, as in Dieu le bénisse for "Bless him".

A special challenge is in translating the carefully-crafted varieties of speech of Tolkien's more idiosyncratic characters. Ledoux renders Gollum's

"'What had it got in its pocketses?' he said. 'It wouldn't say, no precious. Little cheat...'"

as what Ferré calls the prosaic

'Qu'avait-il dans ses poches?' disait-il. 'Je ne pouvais le dire, pas de trésor. Petite tricherie...'

Ferré comments that the translation "diminishes the peculiarities" of the speech of both Gaffer Gamgee and of Gollum; he suggests that Ledoux should have chosen something like (Ferré's emphasis)

'Qu'est-ce que ça avait dans ses pochess?' disait-il. 'Ça ne voulait pas le dire, non, trésor. Petit tricheur...'

The choice of French terms for placename elements is especially tricky, as, Ferré remarks, "some names have, besides a purely historical depth, a connection with literary history, and take on additional resonances." Thus, "Brandy Hall" uses the Beowulfian term "hall", a word "full of echoes". Ledoux selects château, castle, which to Ferré's ear "sounds too 'Arthurian' and 'grand'". Worse, Ledoux uses château also for "Bucklebury" with Châteaubouc. Ferré comments that since Tolkien glosses "-bury" as coming from the Old English word burg, a fortified place, Bucklebury could better have been rendered Fertébouc, using Ferté, a similarly antique French word for fortified town still used in some French placenames.

=== Russian (multiple authors) 1966 onwards ===
==== Samizdat versions ====
Interest in Russia awoke soon after the publication of The Lord of the Rings in 1955, long before the first Russian translation. A first effort at publication was made in the 1960s, but in order to comply with literary censorship in Soviet Russia, the work was considerably abridged and transformed. The ideological danger of the book was seen in the "hidden allegory 'of the conflict between the individualist West and the totalitarian, Communist East'", while, ironically, Marxist readings in the West conversely identified Tolkien's anti-industrial ideas as presented in the Shire with primitive communism, in a struggle with the evil forces of technocratic capitalism. Russian translations of The Lord of the Rings circulated secretly as samizdat and were published only after the collapse of the Soviet Union, but then in great numbers. Tolkien fandom grew especially rapidly during the early 1990s at Moscow State University. Many unofficial and incomplete translations are in circulation.

==== Muravyov and Kistyakovsky (1982–92) ====
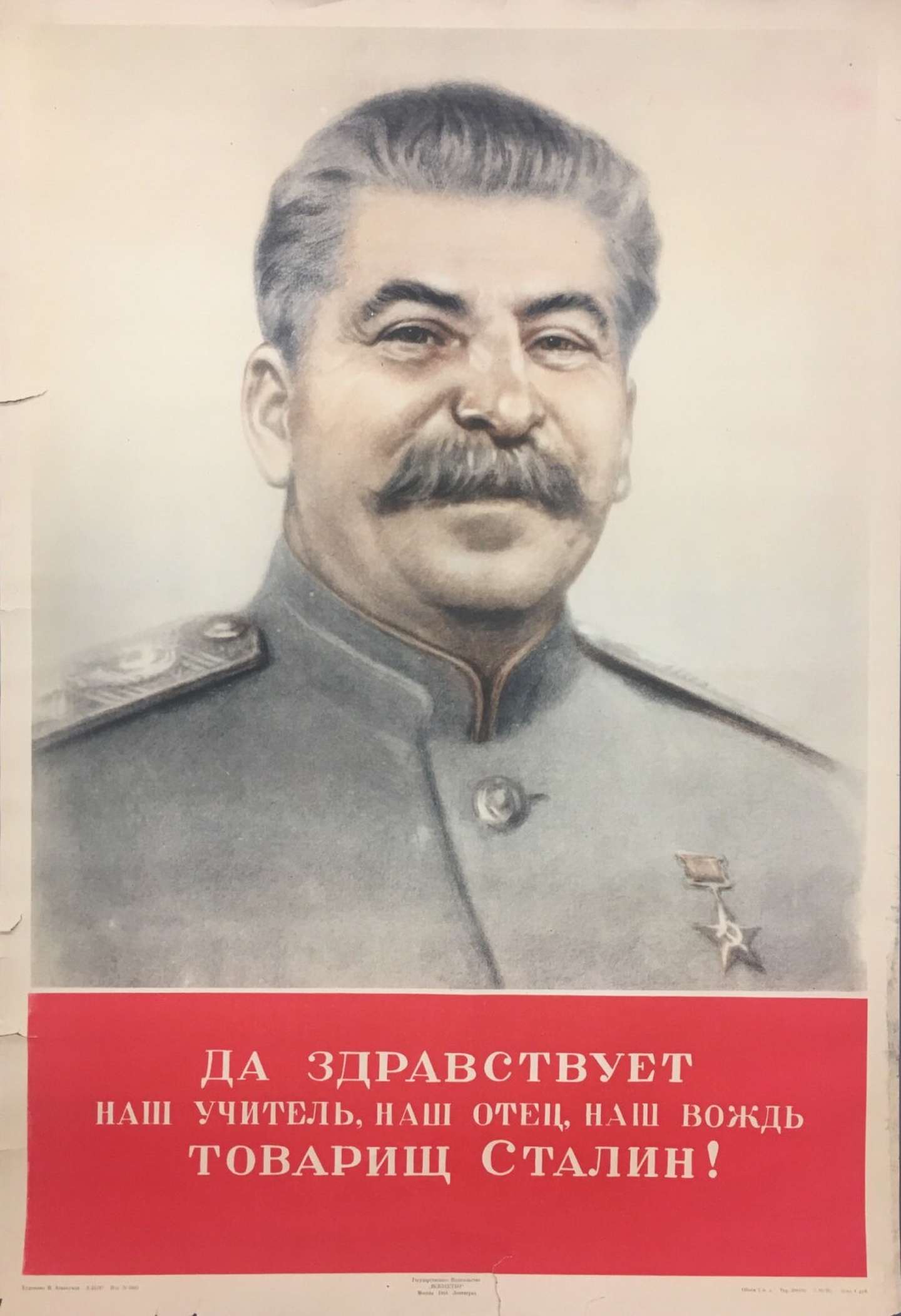
Muravyov and Kistyakovsky's Russian translation used the "loaded words" Generalissimo and Boss that sharply identified Stalin as the evil leader who had taken over the Shire. 1946 poster of Stalin by Nikolai Avvakumov (1908), with the caption "Long live our teacher, our father, our leader, Comrade Stalin!"

The first translation to appear in print was Vladimir Muravyov and Andrey Kistyakovsky's (1982–1992); the linguist and Tolkien scholar Mark Hooker describes this as "a very much russified version". He takes as an example their rendering of the Shirriff-leader's speech to the four homecoming hobbits after their quest:

A Russian treatment of a speech in "The Scouring of the Shire"
Tolkien The Shirriff-leader's speech	Muravyov and Kistyakovsky English by Mark Hooker (his italics)
'There now, Mister, that'll do. It's the Chief's orders that you're to come along quiet. We're going to take you to Bywater and hand you over to the Chief's Men; and when he deals with your case you can have your say. But if you don't want to stay in the Lockholes any longer than you need, I should cut the say short, if I was you.'	'Sir, sir, bethink yourself. In accordance with the Generalissimo's personal orders you are required, immediately and without the least resistance, to proceed under our armed escort to Bywater, where you will be handed over to the secret police. When the Generalissimo pronounces sentence in your case, then they may give you a chance to speak. And if you do not want to spend the rest of your life in the Correctional-Labor Burrows, then my advice to you is: bite your tongues.'

Hooker comments that the whole 1982 text is "much more full of doom and gloom" than the original. He describes the rendering of the Shirrif-leader's speech as an "imitation of a Russian policeman making an arrest", calling it "an elegant equal" to Tolkien's "English bobby". He comments that the Russian version however contains "loaded words" that make the speech "specifically Soviet". The term "Generalissimo" was used only of the dictator Stalin; Hooker notes that the translators went even further in the same chapter, using the highly-charged word Вождь ("Vozhd") for Tolkien's "Boss". He comments that even though this was the most direct rendering of the word, Muravyov and Kistyakovsky's was the only translation that dared to identify Stalin so directly. It was used in the 1991 Khraniteli television play of The Fellowship of the Ring.

=== Hebrew (Livnit) 1977 ===
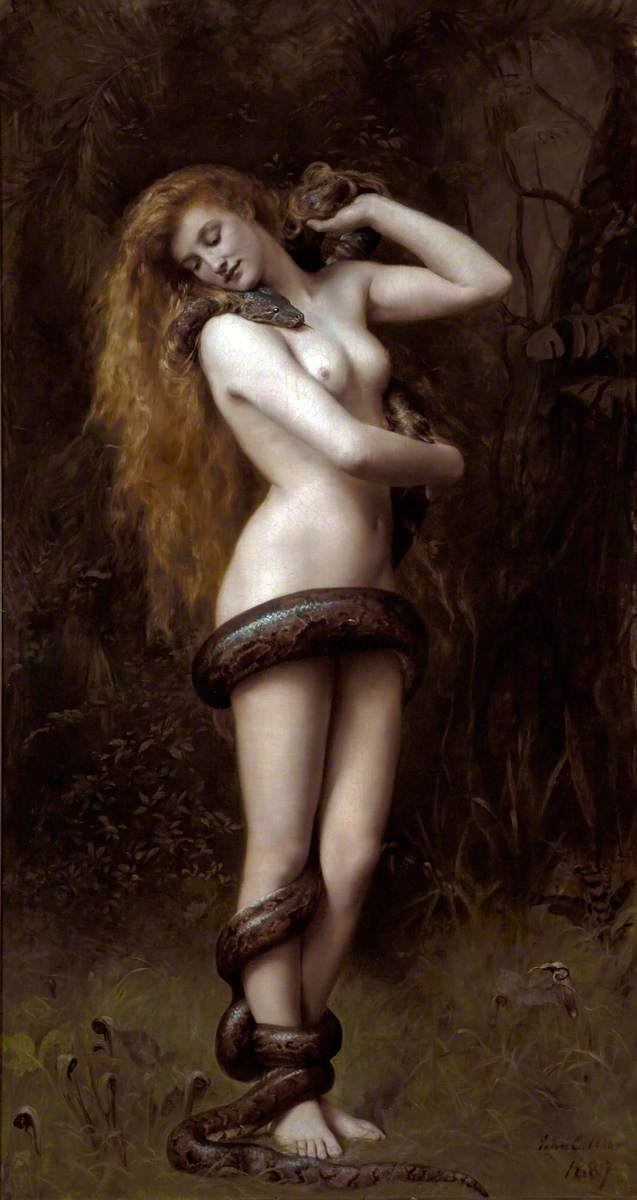
The rendering of "Elves" in the Hebrew translation as "Children of Lilith" was changed to the transliteration "Elefs" to avoid the connotations of Lilith, mother of all demons. Painting of Lilith (1887) by John Collier

The first translation of The Lord of the Rings into Hebrew (שר הטבעות, Sar ha-Tabbaot) was made by Canaanite movement member Ruth Livnit, aided by the poet Uriel Ofek for the verse, in 1977. It was revised by Emanuel Lottem using the second English edition, which retained the names of the previous translators. Lottem was described as the editor, as the least costly option for the publishers. Lottem's version replaced Livnit's in bookshops, helping to stoke a heated controversy. Danny Orbach writes that older Tolkien fans like Livnit's "old, traditional, and literary Hebrew" full of mythological, "mostly Biblical" terms. Thus, Livnit translates "horn" as shofar, a synagogue's ceremonial ram's horn, where the ordinary word would be "keren" (קרן). Or again, she uses "ha'arelim" (הערלים), "uncircumcised", for "heathen", again with religious overtones. Such language gave the translation an impressively "high register" which many Israelis found beautiful and even magical.

Lottem, charged with editing Livnit's version, mixed his preferred, rather technical, modern Hebrew with Livnit's "archaic and rich diction", creating an "odd" result. He found and corrected many mistakes, but introduced a much lower style, including slang. Orbach writes that new, mainly teenage readers prefer Lottem, whether because they "cannot appreciate the beauty of Livnit's Hebrew, or ... prefer accuracy to beauty in translation". Another difference between the two versions is the handling of names. Livnit translated "Elves" as "בני לילית" (Bneyi Lilith, i.e. the "Children of Lilith"). Lottem transcribes it as "Elefs", maintained through Yiddish as "עלף". The change was made because "Bneyi Lilith" recalls the Babylonian-derived Jewish folklore character of Lilith, mother of all demons, an inappropriate context for Tolkien's Elves. Livnit did not know of Tolkien's rules for translating names, resulting in many errors. Lottem translated the appendices and followed Tolkien's instructions there. Livnit made no reference to Tolkien's legendarium, and therefore either inaccurately translated or dropped parts of the story relating to events in The Silmarillion and The Hobbit. She created major inconsistencies in transcription and in repetitions of similar text within the story; Ofek made similar errors in the verse.

Orbach states that it is necessary when translating an epic to use the mythology of the target language: "a Japanese translation must use Shinto and Samurai terminology (as ... Teji Seta actually did)". Hebrew was extinct for nearly 2000 years except for religious use until the 20th century, and the very young language of modern Hebrew "lacks the richness of its ancestor", making it unsuitable for translating an epic like The Lord of the Rings. In his view, therefore, Livnit was right to choose a high style.

=== Spanish (Domènech) 1977–80 ===
The first Spanish translation was made under the pseudonym of Luis Domènech (Francisco Porrúa) in 1977–1980. The linguist Sandra Bayona writes that the translation often renders the speech of characters such as working-class hobbits in grammatically correct Spanish, where Tolkien used non-standard English. Bayona comments that Tolkien uses styles of speech both to distinguish individual characters and to indicate which group they belong to. He does this, she notes, completely regularly, even if this means repetition.

In the case of the working-class hobbits, she shows that characters including Ham Gamgee, Sam Gamgee, Cotton, Hob Hayward, farmer Maggot, and Robin Smallburrow all make use of multiple non-standard English forms. These include duplicating the subject ("Mr. Drogo, he married..."), double negatives ("Talking won't mend nothing"), altered subject-verb agreement ("'Elves and dragons!' I says to him"), elision of sounds ("[My dogs] won't harm you – not unless I tell'em to."), and coined word-forms ("jools" for jewels, "trapessing" for traipsing). Further, they use certain expressions, such as "begging your pardon", "I reckon", and "if you understand [me]" repeatedly. The translation, Bayona explains, either omits these effects altogether, or, as with double negatives, renders them accurately in standard Spanish (where double negation like "Con hablar no remediamos nada" (her emphasis) is grammatically correct). A rare exception, writes Bayona, is the coinage medoreando instead of standard Spanish merodeando to represent "trapessing"; she comments "it certainly marks Ham [Gamgee] in the eyes of the reader."

The effect of the standard Spanish rendering is to continuously tone down Tolkien's construction of differences in style of speech. Bayona concludes that this does not change the plot, nor how the reader sees the characters, but it does sacrifice some of the additional cues that Tolkien provides about each character's social class and individuality.

=== Chinese versions (Chu; Ding et al) 2001–02 ===
Li Hong-man writes that there are multiple obstacles to creating a Chinese version of The Lord of the Rings. These include the large distance between the languages and cultures, and lack of familiarity with the work's themes and subject matter. Li compares two Chinese versions: that of Lucifer Chu (Zhu Xueheng) published by Linking Books in Taipei (Taiwan) in 2001–02, and that of Ding Di (丁棣), Yao Jingrong (姚镜镕), and Tang Dingjiu (汤定九), published by Yilin Press (Nanjing, China) in 2001. Li states that Ding et al's version may be more literary, at the cost of making it "sound like a traditional Chinese wuxia [martial arts fiction] story". In contrast, Chu, more familiar with Western fantasy, has written a far more popular version. Taking the example of the Rhyme of the Rings, Ding et al use a modern Chinese poetry format, whereas Chu uses a classical format likely to be familiar to a Chinese readership. Chu translates the chapter title "A Knife in the Dark" rather directly (黑暗中的小刀, Hēi'àn zhōng de xiǎodāo), whereas Ding et al render it more elaborately (夤夜劍光, Yínyè jiàn guāng, "The light of the sword in the night").

A different tradition is of the youxia, a Chinese analogue of Europe's chivalric knights-errant. Ding et al's version renders "The Passing of the Grey Company" as 游侠骑士 youxia qishi, "the wandering xia riders". Eric Reinders comments that Aragorn fits this mould well, while others like Boromir, Gandalf, Legolas, and Gimli "loosely" approximate it; but the anti-heroic hobbits absolutely do not.

The translations approach names very differently, too. Chu transliterates the name Rivendell (瑞文戴爾 Ruì wén dài'ěr, sounding something like the original), whereas Ding et al follow Tolkien's advice in his "Guide to the Names" and translate its meaning (林谷 língǔ, "Forest Valley").

== See also ==
- Translations of The Hobbit
- Bibliography of J. R. R. Tolkien
- The Etymologies
- List of Tolkien societies internationally
- Bored of the Rings translations

== Sources ==
- Andersson, Erik (5 October 2015). Översättarens anmärkningar : dagbok från arbetet med Ringarnas herre [Translator's Notes: diary from my work on The Lord of the Rings] (in Swedish). Norstedts. ISBN 978-91-1-307110-7.
- Carpenter, Humphrey, ed. (2023) [1981]. The Letters of J. R. R. Tolkien: Revised and Expanded Edition. New York: HarperCollins. ISBN 978-0-35-865298-4.
- Hammond, Wayne G.; Scull, Christina (2005). The Lord of the Rings: A Reader's Companion. London: HarperCollins. 750-782. ISBN 0-00-720907-X.
- Honegger, Thomas, ed. (2011a). Tolkien in Translation. Cormarë series. Vol. 4. Zurich: Walking Tree Publishers. ISBN 978-3-9521424-6-2.
- Honegger, Thomas (2011b) [2004]. "The Westron Turned into Modern English: The Translator and Tolkien's Web of Languages". In Honegger, Thomas (ed.). Translating Tolkien: Text and Film. Cormarë series. Vol. 6. Walking Tree Publishers. pp. 1–18. ISBN 978-3-9521424-9-3.
- Hooker, Mark T. (2003). Tolkien Through Russian Eyes. Zurich: Walking Tree Publishers. ISBN 978-3-9521424-7-9. OCLC 54771230.
- Lobdell, Jared (1975). "Guide to the Names in The Lord of the Rings". A Tolkien Compass. Chicago, Illinois: Open Court Publishing. pp. 153–201. ISBN 0-87548-303-8.
- Reinders, Eric (2024). Reading Tolkien in Chinese. Bloomsbury Publishing. ISBN 978-1-350-37465-2.
- Shippey, Tom (2005) [1982]. The Road to Middle-Earth: How J. R. R. Tolkien Created a New Mythology (Third ed.). HarperCollins. ISBN 978-0-261-10275-0.
- Tolkien, J. R. R. (1955). The Return of the King. The Lord of the Rings. Boston: Houghton Mifflin. OCLC 519647821.
- Turner, Allan (2005). Translating Tolkien: Philological Elements in 'The Lord of the Rings'. Duisburger Arbeiten zur Sprach– und Kulturwissenschaft. Vol. 59. Frankfurt: Peter Lang. ISBN 3-631-53517-1.
