= Andrey Kistyakovsky =

- Born: October 11, 1936; Moscow
- Died: June 30, 1987 (aged 50); Moscow
- Occupations: translator, human rights activist
- Known for: Translations of the Darkness at Noon and The Lord of the Rings

Andrey Andreyevich Kistyakovsky (Russian: Андрей Андреевич Кистяковский, 11 October 1936, Moscow–30 June 1987) was a Russian translator and political activist. He translated belles-lettres and poetry from English to Russian and began publishing in 1967.

Kistyakovsky's 1982 partial translation of The Lord of the Rings (together with Vladimir Muravyov) became the first official Russian translation and remains one of the most acclaimed Russian translations of the novel.

== Life ==
Kistyakovsky hailed from an old dvoryan family. He left the school in the eighth grade and worked as a gasman and metalworker before entering Moscow State University. In 1960s he chummed up with non-conformist artists. In 1971 he completed his graduation, majoring in the English language and literature.

From that time Kistyakovsky also engaged in politics, entering the Political Prisoners Relief Fund. He experienced searches, threats and even beating. In June 1983 he was diagnosed with cancer and was hospitalized. Though he was refused to be treated in the Soviet Union, Kistyakovsky was buried at Dolgoprudnenskoye Cemetery.

== Translations ==
Kistyakovsky's translation of the Darkness at Noon was favoured by its author Arthur Koestler. The translation was published in 1978 with Kistyakovsky's foreword.

In his last years Kistyakovsky succeeded in translation of The Fellowship of the Ring (as The Keepers ("Хранители"), after the nine holders of the Rings of Power) and of all verses there. In an interview Vladimir Muravyov testified: "Kistyakovsky was a brilliant translator, though it was hard for me to work with him... Generally he did not translate, but transpose". Kistyakovsky was praised particularly for "accurate Church Slavonicisms" and "ingenious translations of non-existent verses". The Kistyakovsky-Muravyov translation, which remained the sole Russian version until 1990, reached the second place in the poll on the best Russian translation of The Lord of the Rings, conducted by Russian fan site Tolkien.su.

Kistyakovsky's translations of William Faulkner, Robert Duncan, C. P. Snow, Flannery O'Connor and of some other authors were published in the former Soviet Union. He also translated Catch-22, as well as Amos Tutuola, Wole Soyinka and Seamus Heaney.
