= Cressé =

- Commune
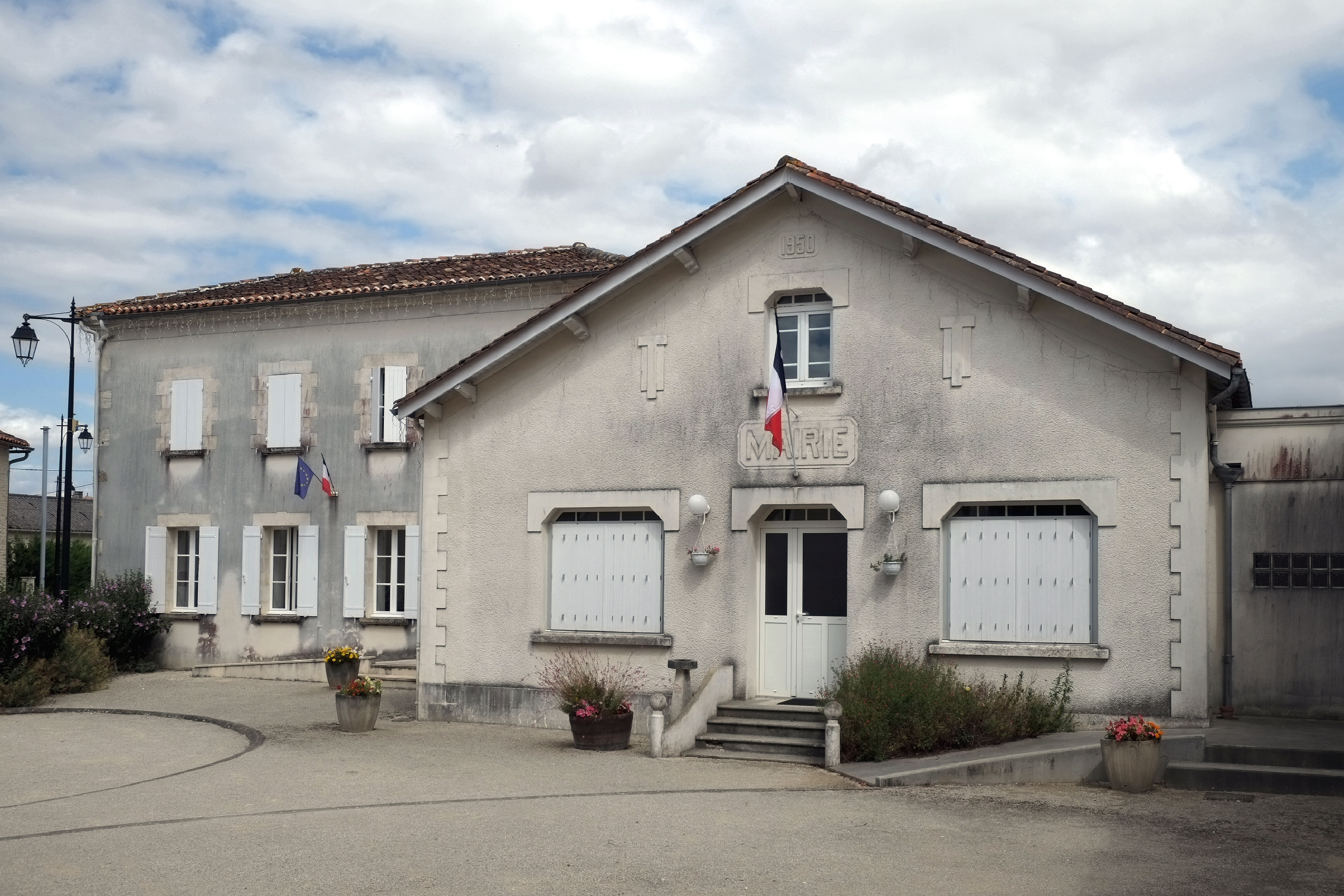
- The town hall in Cressé
- Location of Cressé
- Location within France Location within Nouvelle-Aquitaine
- Coordinates: 45°54′58″N 0°13′03″W
- Country: France
- Region: Nouvelle-Aquitaine
- Department: Charente-Maritime
- Arrondissement: Saint-Jean-d'Angély
- Canton: Matha

Government
  - Mayor (2020–2026): Odile Mégrier
- Area^{1}: 10.96 km^{2} (4.23 sq mi)
- Elevation: 65 m (213 ft)
- Highest elevation: 105 m (344 ft)
- Lowest elevation: 62 m (203 ft)
- Population (2023): 225
  - Density: 20.5/km^{2} (53.2/sq mi)
- Time zone: UTC+01:00 (CET)
  - Summer (DST): UTC+02:00 (CEST)
- INSEE/Postal code: 17135 /17160
- ^{1} French Land Register data, which excludes lakes, ponds, glaciers > 1 km^{2} (0.386 sq mi or 247 acres) and river estuaries.

Cressé (French pronunciation: [kʁese]) is a commune in the Charente-Maritime department in southwestern France.

== Population ==
Historical population
Year	Pop.	±% p.a.
1968	404	—
1975	364	−1.48%
1982	307	−2.40%
1990	266	−1.78%
1999	254	−0.51%
2007	252	−0.10%
2012	220	−2.68%
2017	240	+1.76%
2023	225	−1.07%
Source: INSEE

== See also ==
- Communes of the Charente-Maritime department
