= Ihar Kulikoŭ =

Belarusian writer and translator (born 1988)

- Ігар Мікалаевіч Кулікоў
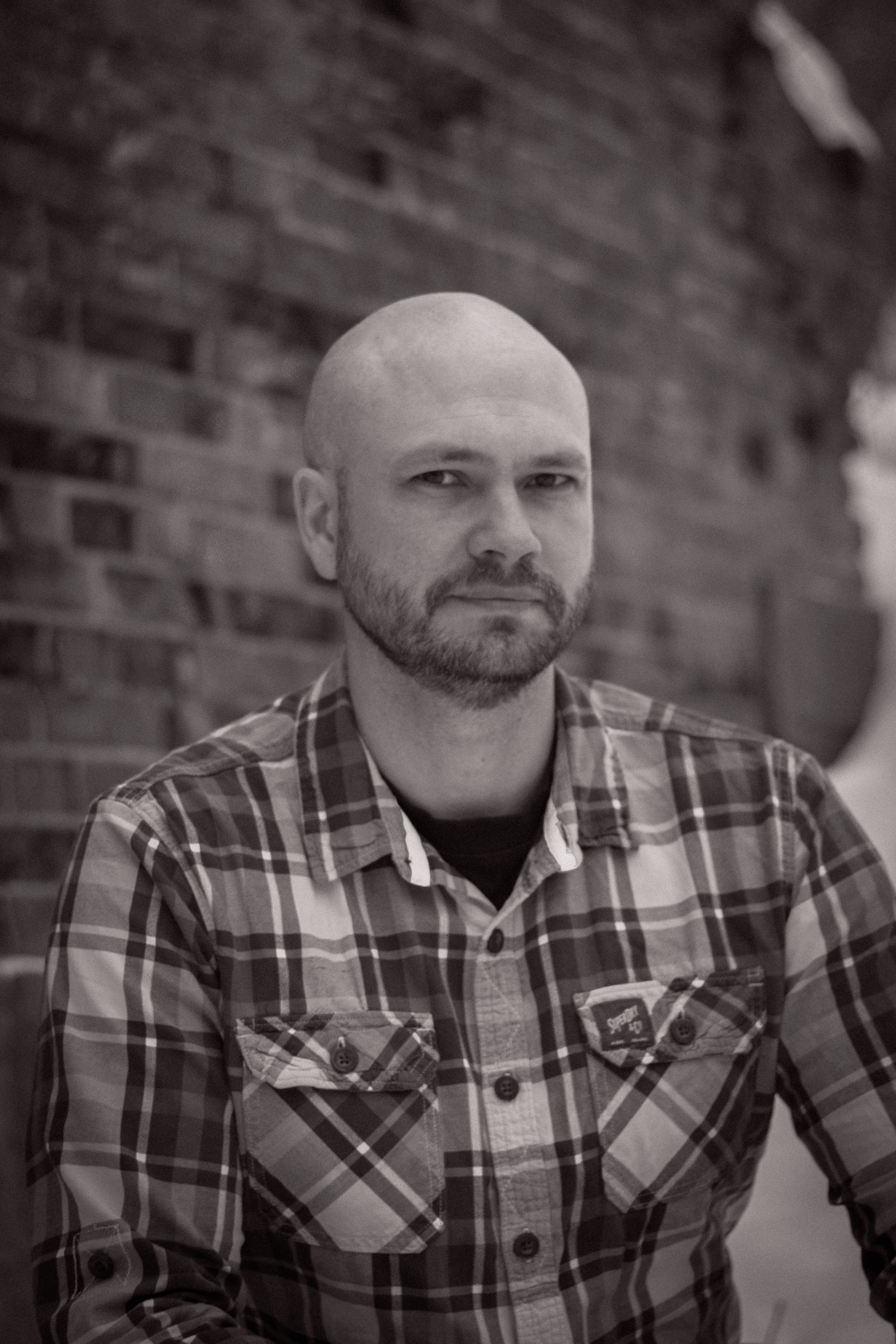
- Born: Ihar Mikalajevič Kulikoŭ; 22 January 1988 (age 38); Minsk, Belarus
- Education: Belarusian State University
- Occupations: Poet, translator
- Writing career
- Language: Belarusian

Ihar Kulikoŭ (Belarusian: Ігар Мікалаевіч Кулікоў; born January 22, 1988, Minsk) is a Belarusian poet and translator.

== Biography ==
Ihar Kulikoŭ was born on January 22, 1988, in Minsk. He graduated from the Faculty of Philology of the Belarusian State University with a degree in Romance-Germanic Philology (English Department) in 2010. Kulikoŭ worked as an English language teacher at the Belarusian State Academy of Arts and also taught private Sanskrit classes (2014-2021).

== Literature works ==
Kulikoŭ is a poet and translator. His works have appeared in the literary journals Dziejaslou and ARCHE. He is the author of seven poetry collections: “Паварот на мора” [A Turn Toward the Sea] (Minsk, 2011), “Свамова” [Svamova] (Minsk, 2013), “Сівер-гара” [Mount North] (Minsk, 2015), “Валадар загадак” [The Lord of Riddles] (Minsk, 2017), “Храм ракі” [A Temple of the River] (Minsk, 2019), “Вецер нішто і рэха цьмы” [The Wind of Nothing and the Echo of Darkness] (Minsk, 2021), and “Нетутэйшая далечыня” [A Distance Not of This Place] (Warsaw, 2025), “Горад N.” [City N.] (Warsaw, 2026).

Ihar Kulikoŭ translates from English and Sanskrit into Belarusian. His translations from English include Leaf by Niggle (Minsk, 2009) and the trilogy The Lord of the Rings (Warsaw, 2023-2024) by J. R. R. Tolkien, Pulp (Minsk, 2018) by Charles Bukowski; Selected Poems of Robert Frost (Minsk, 2023), Sir Gawain and the Green Knight (Warsaw, 2025) by an anonymous 14th-century author, Dune by Frank Herbert (Warsaw, 2025), and from Old English, Old English Poetry (Minsk, 2019).

His translations from Sanskrit include the Rigveda. Mandala I (Minsk, 2016); Kalidasa. The Cloud Messenger (Minsk, 2017); The Tale of Shakuntala (Minsk, 2018); Bhartrihari. Selected Poems (Minsk, 2019); and Mahabharata: Selected Tales (Minsk, 2022).

== Recognition and Awards ==
- Laureate of the Carlos Sherman Literary Prize in the Poetry category (2009).
- Diploma recipient of the Maksim Bahdanovič Debut Prize (2011).
- Laureate of the Maksim Bahdanovič Debut Prize (Special Prize category) for the book Rigveda. Mandala I (2018).
- Laureate of the Carlos Sherman Literary Prize in the Poetry Translation category (2022) for the book Old English Poetry.
- Laureate of the Natallia Arsiennieva Prize (2026) for the book A Distance Not of This Place.

== Bibliography ==
=== Poetry collections ===
- Паварот на мора [A Turn Toward the Sea]. Minsk, 2011, 2017. 94 pp. ISBN 978-985-7165-29-2
- Свамова [Svamova]. Minsk : Medysont, 2013. 92 pp. ISBN 978-985-6982-92-0
- Сівер-гара [Mount North]. Minsk : Medysont, 2015. 70 pp. ISBN 978-985-7085-95-8
- Валадар загадак [The Lord of Riddles]. Minsk : Medysont, 2017. 100 pp. ISBN 978-985-7136-58-2
- Храм ракі [A Temple of the River]. Minsk : A. M. Januškievič, 2019. 158 pp. ISBN 978-985-7210-23-7
- Вецер нішто і рэха цьмы [The Wind of Nothing and the Echo of Darkness]. Minsk : A. M. Januškievič, 2021. 136 pp. ISBN 978-985-7210-95-4
- Нетутэйшая далечыня [A Distance Not of This Place]. Warsaw : A. M. Januškievič, 2025. 170 pp. ISBN 978-83-68202-37-3
- Горад N. [City N.]. Warsaw : A. M. Januškievič, 2026. 164 pp. ISBN 978-83-68202-51-9

=== Translations ===
- Дж. Р. Р. Толкін [J. R. R. Tolkien]. Ліст Ніґла [Leaf by Niggle]. Translated from English by I. M. Kulikoŭ // ARCHE. Minsk, 2009. No. 10 (85). Pp. 105-120.
- Антон Кротаў [Anton Krotov]. Практыка вольных падарожжаў [A Practical Guidebook for Free Travellers]. Translated from Russian. Moscow, 2009, 2016. 84 pp.
- Рыґведа [Rigveda]. Кола І [Mandala I]. Translated from Sanskrit. Minsk: Medysont, 2016. 592 pp. ISBN 978-985-7136-16-2
- Калідаса [Kalidasa]. Воблачны вястун [The Cloud Messenger]. Translated from Sanskrit. Minsk: Zmitser Kolas, 2017. 92 pp. ISBN 978-985-7164-55-4
- Аповед пра Шакунталу [The Tale of Shakuntala]. Translated from Sanskrit. Minsk: A. M. Januškievič, 2018. 218 pp. ISBN 978-985-7165-72-8
- Чарлз Букоўскі [Charles Bukowski]. Чытво [Pulp]. Translated from English. Minsk: Lohvinau, 2018. 484 pp. ISBN 978-609-8213-39-3
- Бгартрыгары [Bhartrhari]. Выбраныя вершы [Selected Poems]. Translated from Sanskrit. Minsk: Zmitser Kolas, 2019. 80 pp. ISBN 978-985-23-0034-6
- Стараангельская паэзія [Old English Poetry]. Translated from Old English. Minsk: A. M. Januškievič, 2019. 178 pp. ISBN 978-985-7210-183
- Магабгарата : выбраныя аповеды [Mahabharata: Selected Stories] / Translated from Sanskrit by Ihar Kulikou. Minsk: A. M. Januškievič, 2022. 484 pp. ISBN 978-985-7283-09-5
- Роберт Фрост [Robert Frost]. Выбраныя вершы [Selected Poems]. Translated from English. Minsk: Encyklapediks, 2023. 110 pp. ISBN 978-985-7247-70-7
- Дж. Р. Р. Толкін [J. R. R. Tolkien]. Валадар пярсцёнкаў. Брацтва Пярсцёнка [The Lord of the Rings. The Fellowship of the Ring]. Translated from English. Warsaw: A. M. Januškievič, 2023. 574 pp. ISBN 978-83-969297-6-1
- Дж. Р. Р. Толкін [J. R. R. Tolkien]. Валадар Пярсцёнкаў. Дзве Вежы [The Lord of the Rings. The Two Towers]. Translated from English. Warsaw: A. M. Januškievič, 2024. 494 pp. ISBN 978-83-68202-07-6
- Дж. Р. Р. Толкін [J. R. R. Tolkien]. Валадар Пярсцёнкаў. Вяртанне Караля [The Lord of the Rings. The Return of the King]. Translated from English. Warsaw: A. M. Januškievič, 2024. 596 pp. ISBN 978-83-68202-19-9
- Сэр Гавейн і Зялёны Рыцар [Sir Gawain and the Green Knight]. Translated from English. Warsaw: A. M. Januškievič, 2025. 232 pp. ISBN 978-83-68202-29-8
- Фрэнк Герберт [Frank Herbert]. Дзюна [Dune]. Translated from English. Warsaw: A. M. Januškievič, 2025. 750 pp. ISBN 978-83-68202-33-5
