= Zlatko Crnković (translator) =

Croatian translator, writer, critic and editor

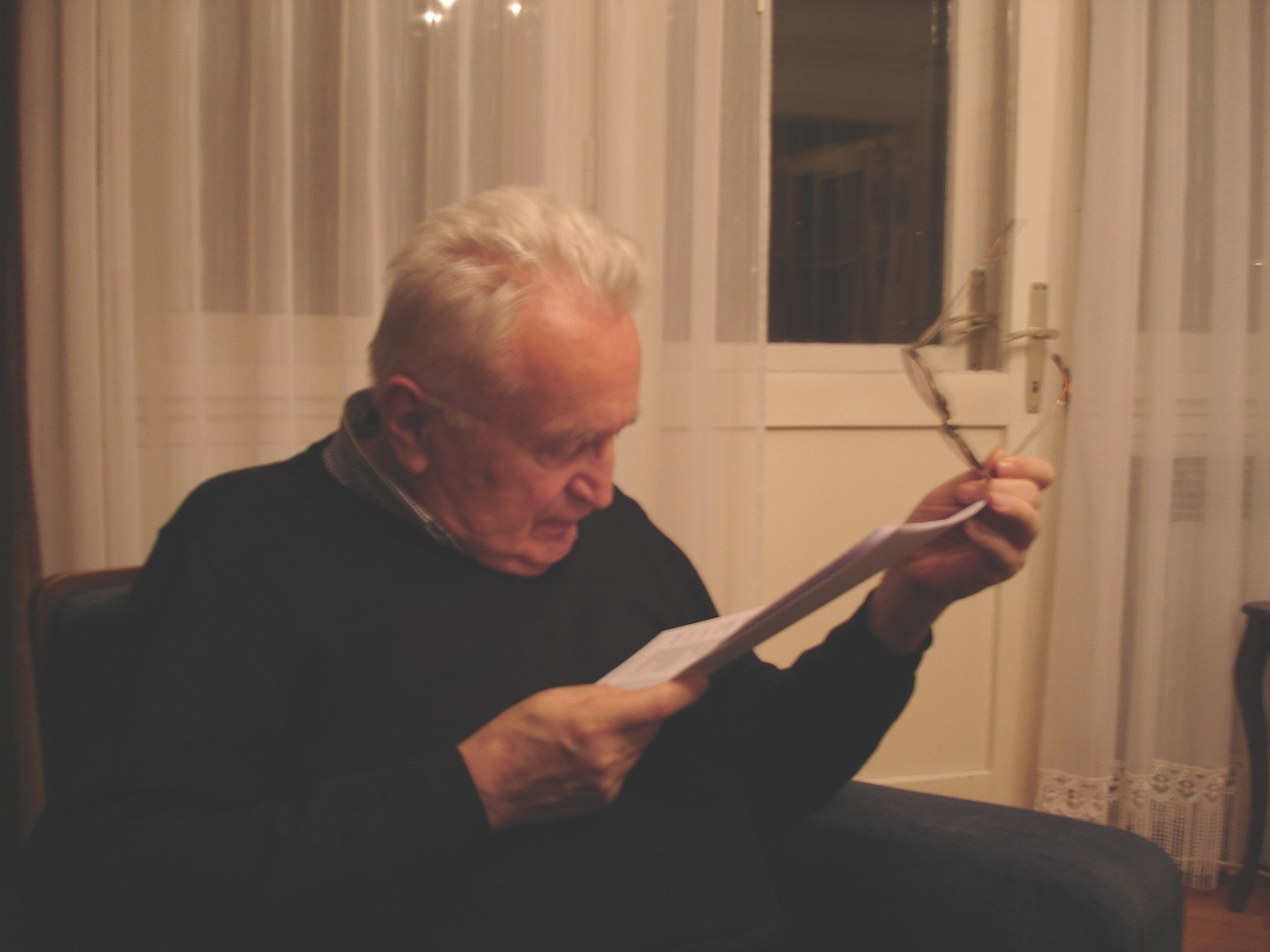
Zlatko Crnković reading the print of his own biography from the Croatian Wikipedia (January 2007).

Zlatko Crnković (11 May 1931 – 2 November 2013) was a Croatian literary translator, writer, critic and editor.

== Biography ==
Born in the village of Čaglin near Požega in eastern Croatia, Crnković moved to Zagreb for secondary school, and later enrolled at Zagreb Faculty of Philosophy where he majored in English and German languages and literatures. He also studied American literature at UC Berkeley in the 1961–62 academic year.

Crnković authored many translations from German, English, Russian and French. Over the course of several decades he served as editor at Znanje publishing house and edited 260 titles of the highly successful fiction series called HIT, in addition to about 160 titles in ITD series, about 80 books in the Evergrin series, and a number of anthologies.

Although officially retired in 1994, he continued to translate and edit books for various publishers, mainly for the Zagreb-based publishing house Algoritam, which published a series of fiction titles called "Zlatko Crnković presents". He edited 50 books for the series.

After retirement, he decided to clean up the documentation he collected over the years, which has resulted in a series of essays in 1998 Knjige moga života ("Books of my life") and selected letters exchanged with Ivan Aralica Pisac i njegov urednik ("Writer and His Editor"). He published a memoir Prošla baba s kolačima (2002) and a collection of miscellaneous writings Knjigositnice (2003). Knjiga snova ("Book of Dreams") was published in 2003, and a selection of letters, exchanged with Ivan Kušan, in 2006 under the title Oko Sljemena i globusa.

He received the main prize of the Croatian Association of Literary Translators in 1971 and 1986, and the Kiklop award in 2006 as the editor of the year.
