= Ida Nyrop Ludvigsen =

Ida Nyrop Ludvigsen (1927–1973), Danish translator and official, was born and raised in Gentofte, Denmark as the first of two children. Her parents, mag.art Karen Nyrop and mag.art Anders Carl Christensen, were both engaged to teach French language for listeners at the Danish State Broadcast when it started around 1926.

Ludvigsen lost her father at the age of fourteen, but her mother Karen managed the very popular radio lessons until 1953 and provided for her family by numerous translations of classic and modern French literature.

Ludvigsen married in 1946 to Holger Ludvigsen (1925–2008) and never finished her university studies in literature, but became a mother of five children. Among them is the author and journalist Jacob Ludvigsen (1947) who among other happenings founded the free town of Christiania in Copenhagen. After thirteen years of marriage and mothering, she started working at the Danish Royal Library in Copenhagen. She published occasional short stories, articles or reviews, and a single collection of poems called Modsat (Opposite) in 1966. At that time, she started her career as a translator from English.

Her most successful work was translating J. R. R. Tolkien's books. Her translation of The Lord of the Rings (1968-1972) was the first to profit from Tolkien's "Guide to the Names in The Lord of the Rings" for translators. The translation has been criticised by linguists as well as by Tolkien fans; it adapted Tolkien's style to suit a Danish audience. However, at the time there were few works of Tolkien scholarship for Ludvigsen to refer to when making her translation.

She had numerous other public roles, the most important as a member of the Danish State Radio council.
