= Yilin Press =

Publisher in China

Coordinates: 32°04′28″N 118°47′24″E

- Parent company: Phoenix Publishing & Media, Inc.
- Founded: 1988
- Founder: Phoenix Publishing & Media, Inc.
- Country of origin: China
- Headquarters location: Nanjing, Jiangsu
- Distribution: Simon & Schuster (United States)
- Key people: Gu Aibin (director); Liu Feng (editor-in-chief)
- Publication types: Academic publishing
- Official website: www.yilin.com

The Yilin Press (simplified Chinese: 译林出版社; traditional Chinese: 譯林出版社; pinyin: Yìlín Chūbǎnshè) is a publishing house established in 1988, as a division of Phoenix Publishing & Media, Inc. (Chinese: 凤凰传媒出版集团), and focused on academic publishing. Its office in Nanjing, capital of Jiangsu province, China. Its current director is Gu Aibin (顾爱彬) and the editor-in-chief is Liu Feng (刘峰).

== Background and history ==
Beginning in 1976, Chinese publishers increasingly produced translated Western fiction, including both works deemed classic or artistically serious, as well as fiction for the popular market.

In 1979, Yilin magazine was founded as a part of Jiangsu People's Publishing House.

Yilin Press was founded in 1988. Compared to most publishers of the time, Yilin was more focused on popular works, including popular fiction. Yilin's editorial guidelines stated that it welcomed foreign popular fiction, which was uncommon at the time.

Yilin's 1994 translation of Ulysses was high-profile.

Yilin departed from the typical style of simple cover design for works deemed serious literature in the Chinese publishing industry, instead using more colorful covers.

In 2001, Yilin produced a translation of The Lord of the Rings in an effort to capitalize on the release of the film.
