= Lucifer Chu =

Taiwanese writer (born 1975)

- 朱學恒
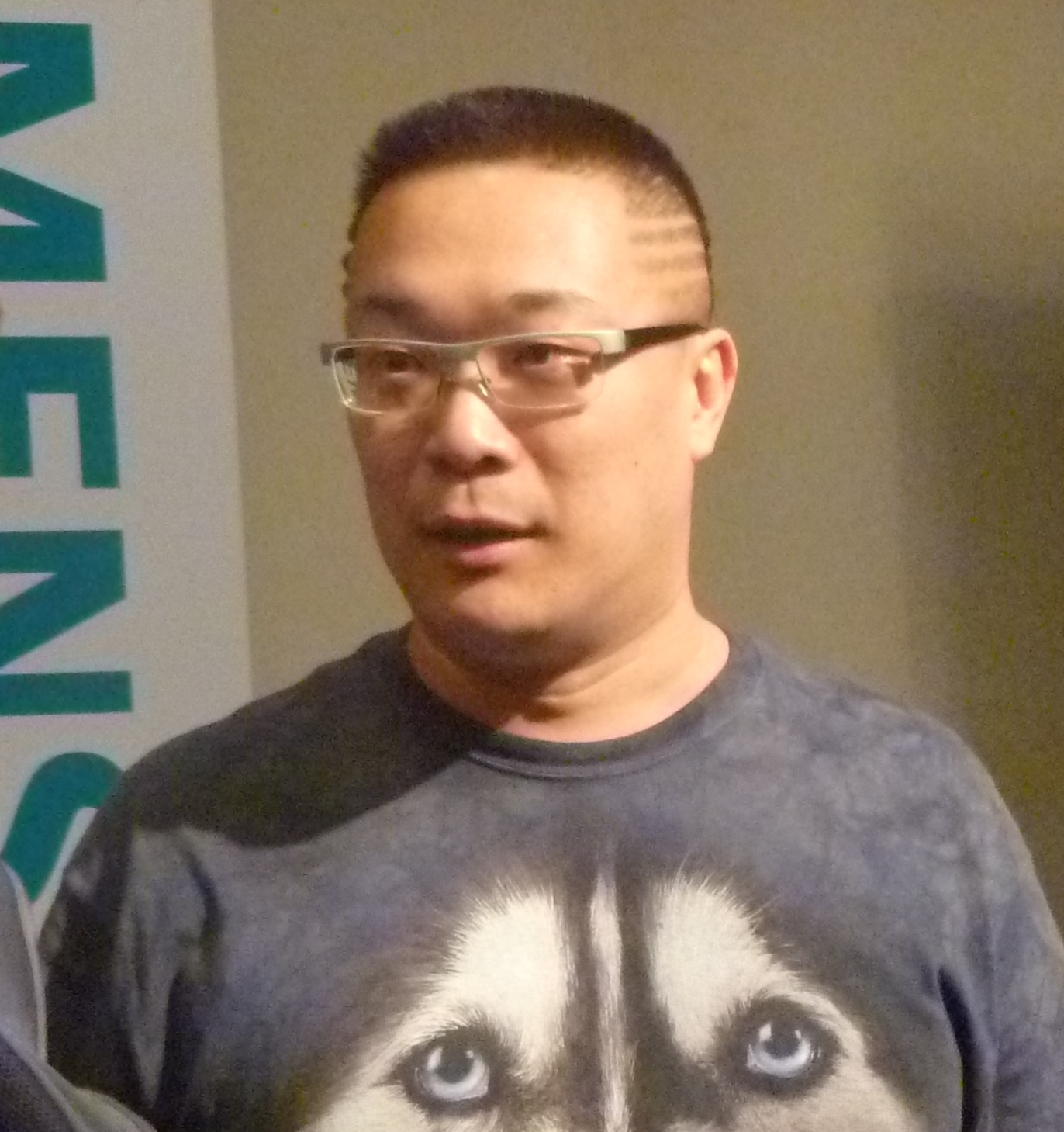
- Chu in 2012
- Born: February 19, 1975 (age 51); Taipei, Taiwan
- Education: National Central University (BS)
- Occupations: Writer, translator
- Writing career
- Genres: Fantasy, high fantasy, translation, criticism
- Subjects: Make a big success in life with cynicism spirit. Being no God in the new world. Play video games to learn English.
- Notable works: Chinese version of The Hobbit; Chinese version of The Lord of the Rings

Lucifer Chu (Chinese: 朱學恒; pinyin: Zhū Xuéhéng; Wade–Giles: Chu Hsueh-heng; Pe̍h-ōe-jī: Chu Ha̍k-hêng; born February 19, 1975) is a Taiwanese writer and translator. He dedicated himself to promoting fantasy literature because of his passion for video games and fantasy fiction. He translated J. R. R. Tolkien's The Hobbit and The Lord of the Rings into Chinese. He also translated Dragonlance Chronicle, published in 1998. He has translated 30 fantasy novels into Chinese.

== Career ==
Chu graduated from Taiwan's National Central University in 1998 with a Bachelor of Science degree in electrical engineering. Chu learned English by playing computer games and writing reviews and walk-throughs for gaming magazines, and later by working as a professional translator of fantasy novels. He is the author of five Chinese books and translator of more than twenty fantasy novels.

Chu translated The Lord of the Rings into Chinese. The Linking company published his translation in 2001. Online criticism focused on the quality of his translation followed, and Chu organized a public event encouraging revisions of his translation in 2002. Academic Eric Reinder writes that while Chu's experience with video games affects the vocabulary of his translation (such as writing that Sauron's gaze would "lock onto" the "target" of Frodo Baggins), Chu's cultural competency with the fantasy genre is primarily a positive aspect of Chu's translation. A version revised by translator Deng Jiawan (Joy Teng) was prepared, but for business reasons the Linking company did not publish the revised version until 2012.

In 2002, Chu founded the Fantasy Culture and Art Foundation using proceeds from his Lord of the Rings translation.

An ex-millionaire, he claimed in several speeches that he spent almost all the royalties earned from The Hobbit and The Lord of the Rings trilogy on open education, localizing open knowledge and encouraging young people's innovation.

He also founded the Open Source Open Courseware Prototype System (OOPS). The OOPS is a volunteer-based localization project with the goal of translating open knowledge into Chinese. Over 20,000 volunteers are estimated to have joined the OOPS.

He has spoken at education seminars. Chu appears on television, radio, and social media. He has YouTube and Facebook streams covering on Taiwan current events, gaming, culture, learning English, and his cats.

In June 2023, Kuomintang Taipei City Councilor Chung Pei-chun (鍾沛君) accused Lucifer Chu of forcibly hugged and kissed her in 2022. Chu later suspended all of activities in response to the incident. On June 12, Chu reported himself to the courts. Chung criticised Chu's action "exploit the justice system to whitewash his reputation". Prosecutors indicted charges against Chu by indecent assault in October 2023, and the Taipei District Court ordered him 14 months impressment at the first trial in March 2024.
