= Max Schuchart =

Dutch poet, translator, journalist and writer

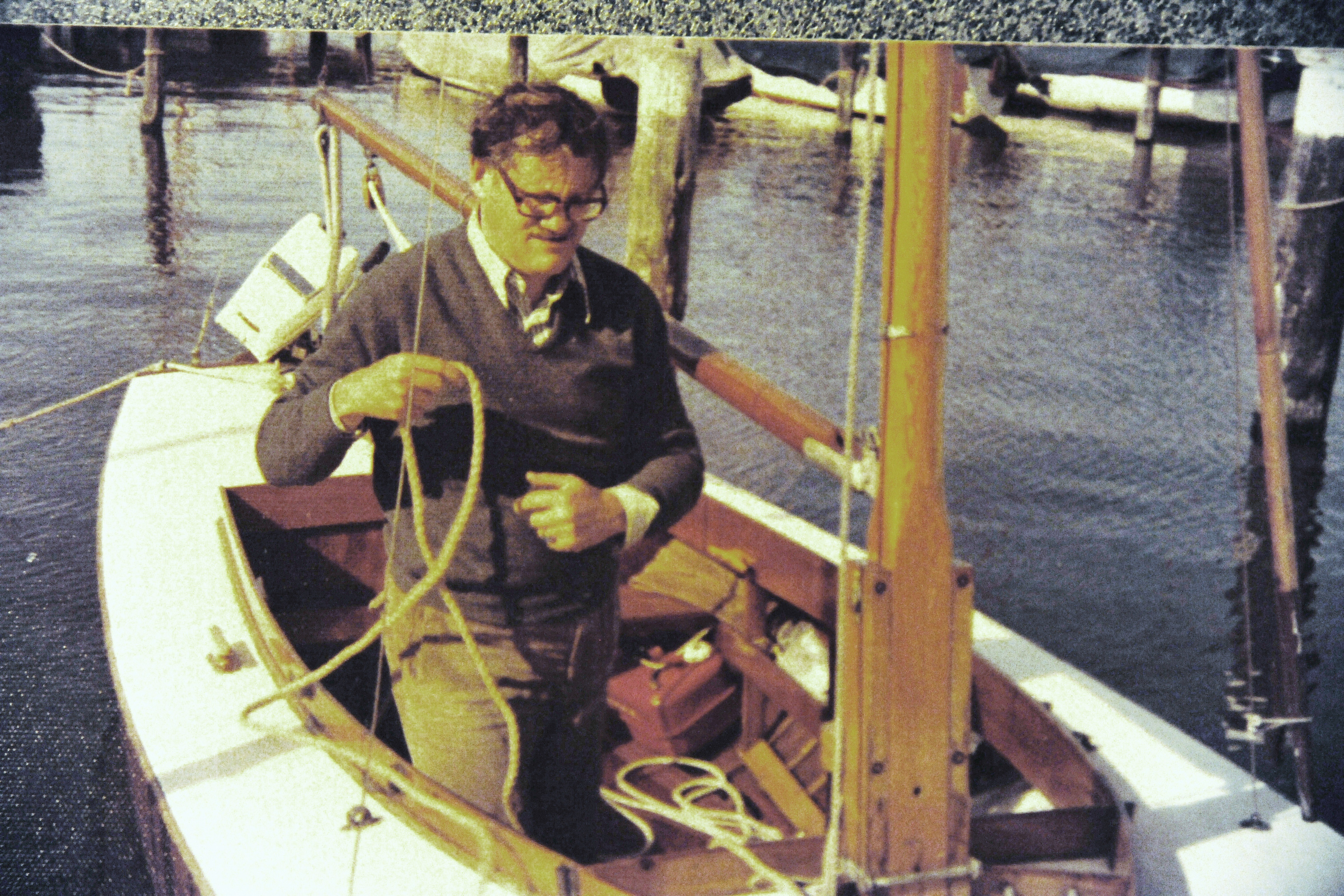
Max Schuchart

Max Schuchart MBE (16 August 1920 – 25 February 2005) was a Dutch journalist, literary critic and translator. He is most famous for translating the works of J. R. R. Tolkien into the Dutch language.

== Life ==
He was born on 16 August 1920 in Rotterdam.

He died in 2005 in The Hague.

== Career ==
His Dutch translation of the Lord of the Rings (In de Ban van de Ring) appeared in 1957 and was a resounding success, though its author J. R. R. Tolkien deeply disliked it, criticising its approach in a letter to his publisher Rayner Unwin. In particular, Tolkien objected to the translation of proper names, writing that "In principle I object as strongly as is possible to the 'translation' of the nomenclature at all (even by a competent person). I wonder why a translator should think himself called on or entitled to do any such thing. That this is an 'imaginary' world does not give him any right to remodel it according to his fancy, even if he could in a few months create a new coherent structure which it took me years to work out."

He translated many other English authors into Dutch language. These include Graham Greene Oscar Wilde, Lord Dunsany, Daniel Defoe, Richard Adams, Terry Goodkind, William Horwood, and Salman Rushdie.

== Distinctions ==
Schuchart has received the Martinus Nijhoff Prize.

In 1978, he received an MBE from Queen Elizabeth.

== Bibliography ==
Some of his books are:

- The Netherlands
- Het zwaard van de waarheid
- Steen der tranen
- The Lord of the Rings (Dutch translation)
- The Hobbit (Dutch translation)
