= Thomas Jones Barker =

British artist (1815–1882)

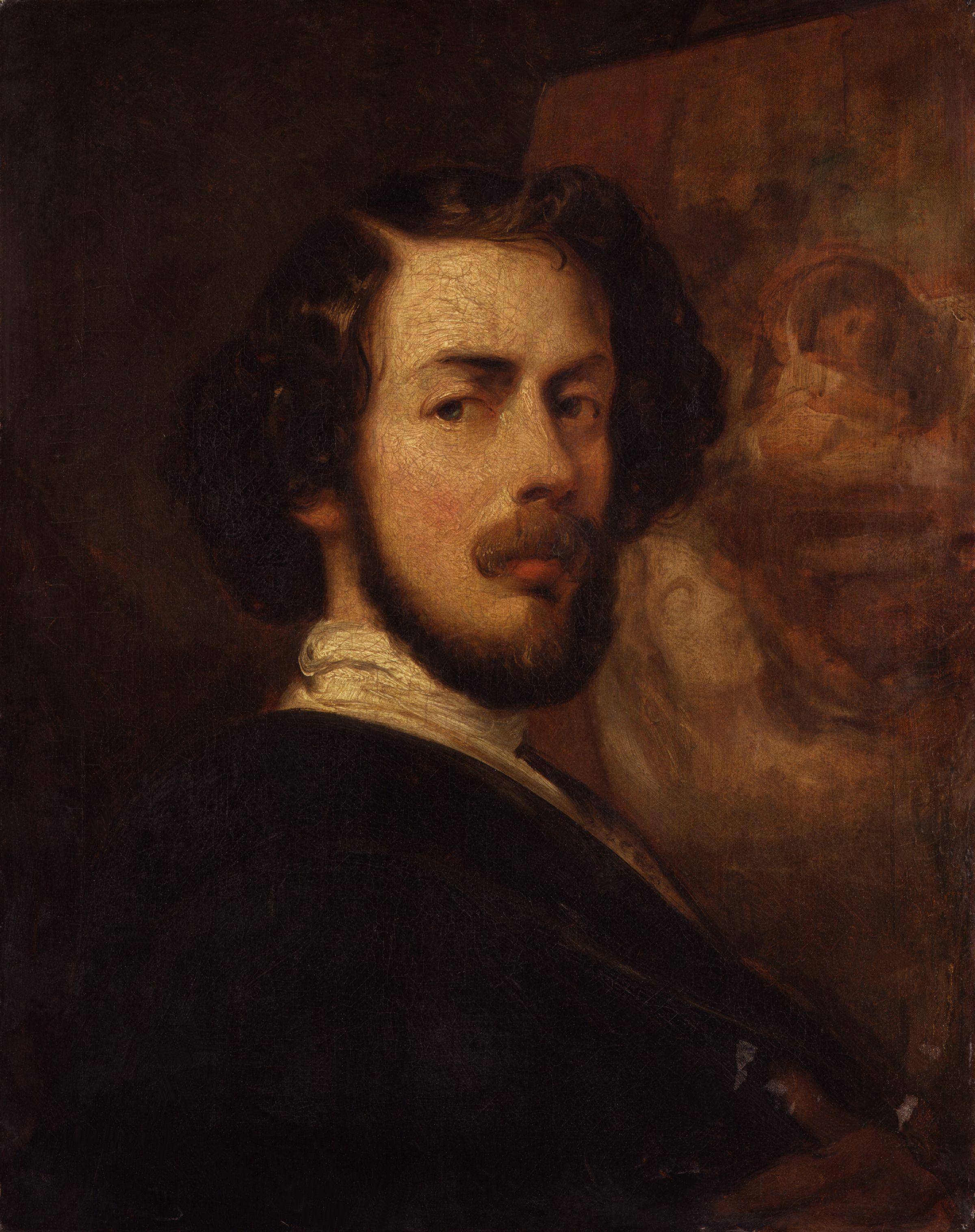
- Self-Portrait, 1848; National Portrait Gallery, London
- Born: 19 April 1813; Bath
- Died: 29 March 1882 (aged 68); Haverstock Hill, Hampstead
- Education: Studio of Horace Vernet
- Works: The Bride of Death (1839), Parisina (1842), The Secret of England's Greatness (c. 1862–1863), The Battle of Waterloo (undated)
- Parents: Thomas Barker (father); Pricilla Jones Barker (mother)

Signature
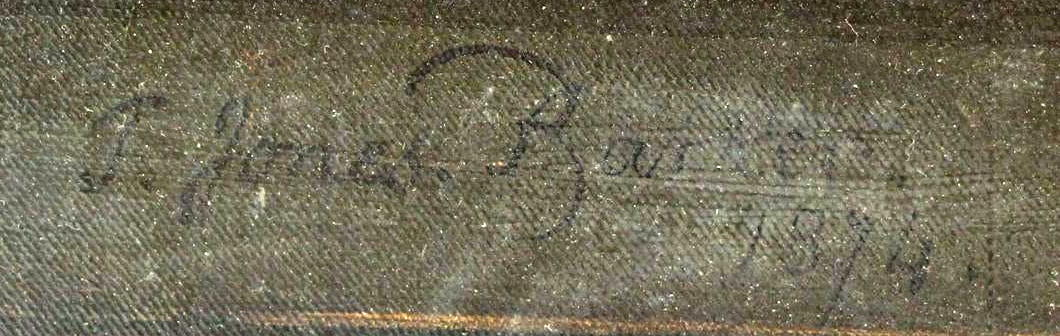

Thomas Jones Barker (19 April 1813 – 29 March 1882) was an English historical, military, and portrait painter.

== The Barkers of Bath ==
Thomas Jones Barker was born at Bath in 1815, into a family of artists. His grandfather, Benjamin Barker, was "a failed barrister…who painted horses with limited success" and eventually became "foreman and enamel painter at the japan works, Pontypool, expert at painting sporting and animal figures." His father was the prominent painter Thomas Barker, also called Barker of Bath. His uncles Benjamin Barker Jr., and Joseph Barker were also painters, as was his younger brother, John Joseph Barker, and his cousin, Marianne A. Barker, daughter of his uncle Benjamin.

== Career in France ==
After studying under his father, in 1834, at age 19, he moved to Paris and became a student of Horace Vernet. He made his debut at the Paris Salon of 1836 with three paintings, including Beauties of the Court of Charles II, which received a bronze medal. (His father also exhibited in the Salon of 1836.) From 1836 to 1850, Barker showed 28 paintings at the annual Paris exhibition.

A dozen of those paintings depicted hunters, poachers, dogs, and game. Barker's earliest known work, a collaboration with his father from 1834, depicted a boy guarding game while his father, in the distance, goes about hunting with a rifle and dog. This early and enduring interest in hunting and in dogs provides a rare glimpse into Barker's personal life. In Paris, Barker had a dog named Mentor who appears in some of his paintings.

Barker's work was so well received in France that he was invited to meet King Louis Philippe I and was given two royal commissions. For these works, the king conferred on Barker the Cross of the Legion of Honour. The first royal commission was a large painting depicting the death of Louis XIV at Versailles; this painting disappeared in the sack of the Palais Royal in the French Revolution of 1848. An oil on cardboard sketch for the work, made on the spot for the king, is in the collection of the Musée Antoine Lécuyer in Saint-Quentin, France.

=== The Bride of Death ===
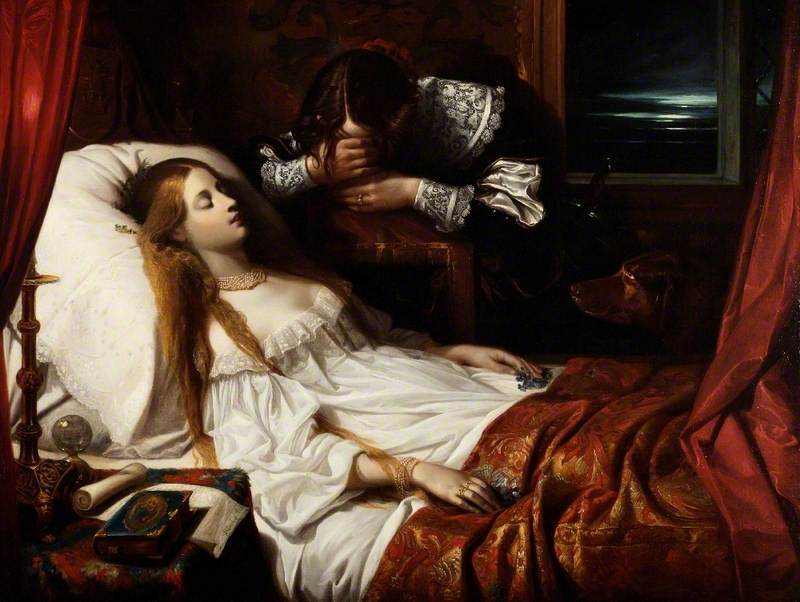
The Bride of Death, 1839, Victoria Art Gallery.

Barker's second royal commission was for the king's daughter, Princess Marie; the painting La fiancée de la mort (The Bride of Death) was completed in 1839 and was shown at Paris Salon of 1841. Princess Marie, an artist in her own right, declared it "to be a revival of the intellectual" in art. The contemporary French poet J-F. Destigny described it as "a dark memory, an intimate pain, a thrilling drama of love and misfortune that bears the stamp of a noble character. It is a work where the heart has surpassed the mind, an endearing mirror for every broken soul."

The painting's exhibition in Bath in 1845 occasioned the publication of Charles Empson's Memoranda Relative to The Bride of Death, a Picture Painted by Thomas Jones Barker, an effusive appreciation with a compendium of verses written in homage. Noting the presence of a dog in the picture (modeled on Barker's own dog), Empson noted that "the only living eye in the picture's composition is that of Mentor, and it is indeed wonderfully life-like."

The Bride of Death is now in the collection of the Victoria Art Gallery in Bath. Before the more recent revival of interest in The Secret of England's Greatness, it was considered Barker's most famous painting. The entry for The Bride of Death in the catalogue for the Salon of 1841 includes the ancienne ballade that inspired Barker's painting:

Laure est là sur son lit, comme un ange qui dort:
Viens couronner de fleurs ta jeune fiancée !
— Mais ses yeux sont éteints, sa poitrine est glacée.
Elle est épouse de la mort !

Pauvre amant, le trépas t'a ravi l'espérance !
Elle t'aimait dés l'aube, on t'éloigna le soir;
Ton départ pour son cœur fut comme un coup de lance !
Elle est morte de désespoir !

Des fleurs, des fleurs sur elle !... Orne sa blonde tête
De ces filles des bois aux modestes attraits;
Point de roses surtout; ce sont des fleurs de fête.
Des violettes, des cyprès !

Mais ne la pleure pas !... Elle avait trop de charmes
Pour vivre dans un monde ignorant du vrai beau.
Cet ange, prisonnier dans nos vallons de larmes,
Devient libre par le tombeau !

Translation:

Laure is there on her bed, like a sleeping angel :
Come crown your young bride with flowers !
But her eyes are extinguished, her breast is frozen.
She is the wife of death !

Poor lover, death has robbed you of hope !
She loved you at dawn, she was taken at dusk;
Your departure was like a spear in her heart !
She died of despair !

Flowers, flowers for her! Adorn her fair head
like those girls of the forest with modest charms;
Above all no roses; they are festive flowers.
Violets, cypresses !

But weep not for her! She was too sublime
To live in a world ignorant of true beauty.
This angel, a prisoner in our valley of tears,
Set free by the tomb !

=== Parisina ===
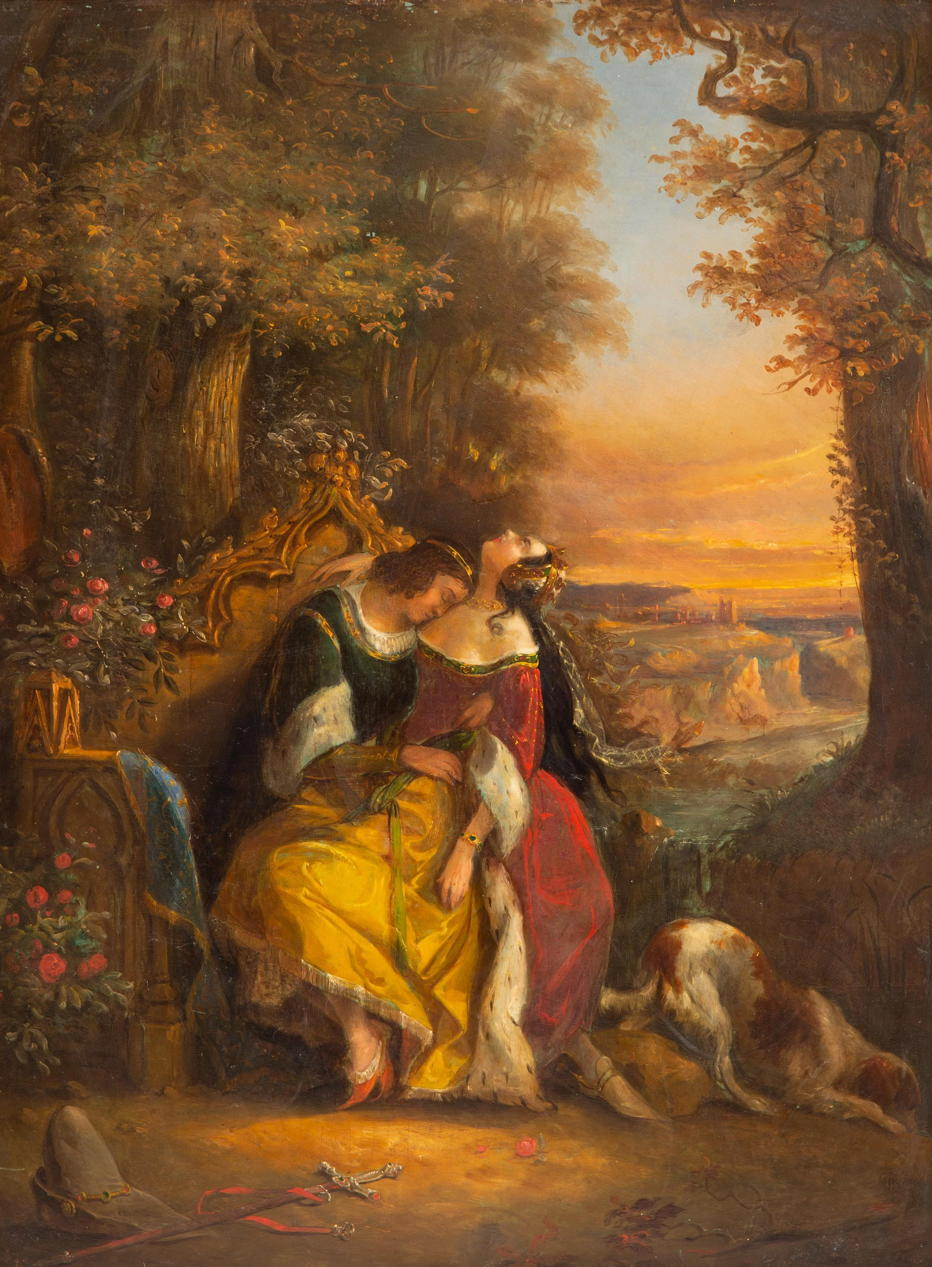
Parisina, 1842, private collection.

Barker's Parisina, one of three paintings he exhibited at the Paris Salon of 1842, exemplifies several of the influences on his work while in France—the historical drama and vivid detail of his teacher, Vernet; the Style troubadour, with its idealized depictions of the Middle Ages and the Renaissance; and literary inspiration, in this case the long poem Parisina by Lord Byron. (Vernet had similarly drawn inspiration from Byron with his painting of 1826, Mazepa and the Wolves.) The entry for Barker's Parisina in the catalogue for the Paris Salon of 1842 quotes (in French translation) the lines that inspired the painting:

And heedless as the dead are they
Of aught around, above, beneath;
As if all else had passed away,
They only for each other breathe...
Of guilt, of peril, do they deem
In that tumultuous tender dream ?

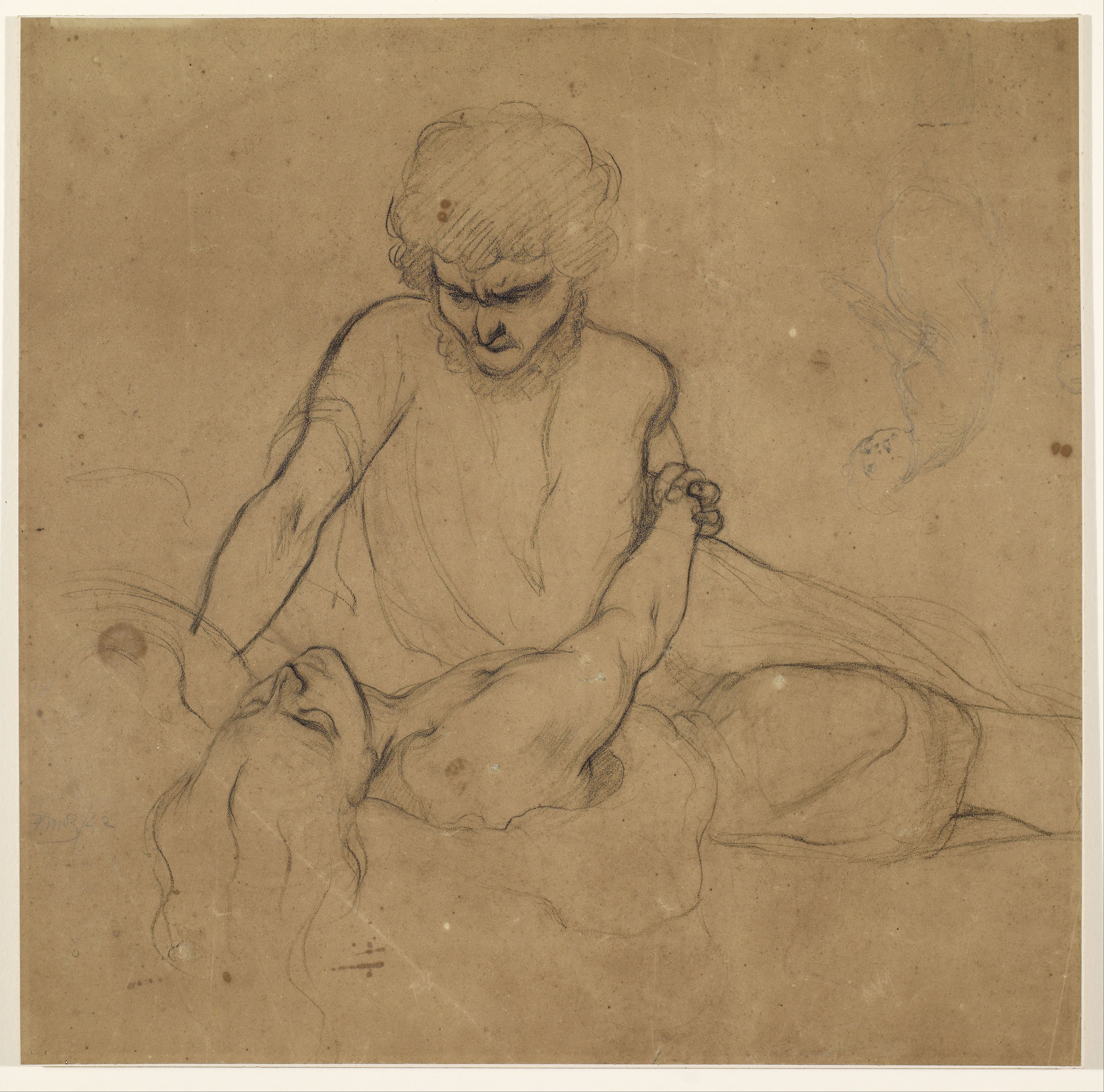
Ford Madox Brown's painting of Parisina is lost, but a few studies exist.

Byron's poem tells the story of a deadly love triangle involving an Italian nobleman, Azo, his young bride, Parisina, and Azo's bastard son, Hugo. Barker chose to illustrate a passage in which "the two adulterers are lost in each other, oblivious to the danger of their love. By choosing these lines, Barker focuses on the intensity of their love, picking up the broader theme of illicit lovers but also highlighting Byron's homage to Dante's Paolo and Francesca." Barker's imagery is chaste—the lovers are fully dressed—but does include some subtle symbolism: a bejeweled sword with a bit of blood at the tip and a bejeweled cap to represent the carnal congress of the lovers, and the silhouette of an alert stag in the far distance to represent the cuckolded Azo. The dog in the painting may be Barker's dog Mentor, who also appears in The Bride of Death, here seen averting his gaze from the lovers.

The next year, another painting inspired by the poem, by another Englishman in Paris, Ford Madox Brown, was rejected by the Salon with "a polite accompanying note stating that the subject was too improper for the walls of the French gallery under Louis Philippe." Brown ran afoul of the Salon committee by concentrating on the moment an enraged Azo hears Parisina murmur words of love to Hugo in her sleep. Brown's focus on Azo's fury "aligns the work to broader themes of violence and murder, perhaps less palatable in France than romance." Barker's homage to reckless love was more attuned to Parisian taste. Nevertheless, a contemporary critic cautioned that mothers entering the gallery should avert the eyes of their daughters from the sight of "a swooning Parisina on a gentleman's knees."

The whereabouts and precise imagery of Barker's Parisina were long unknown to scholars, until the painting appeared at an auction in New York in 2020.

== Career in England: War paintings ==
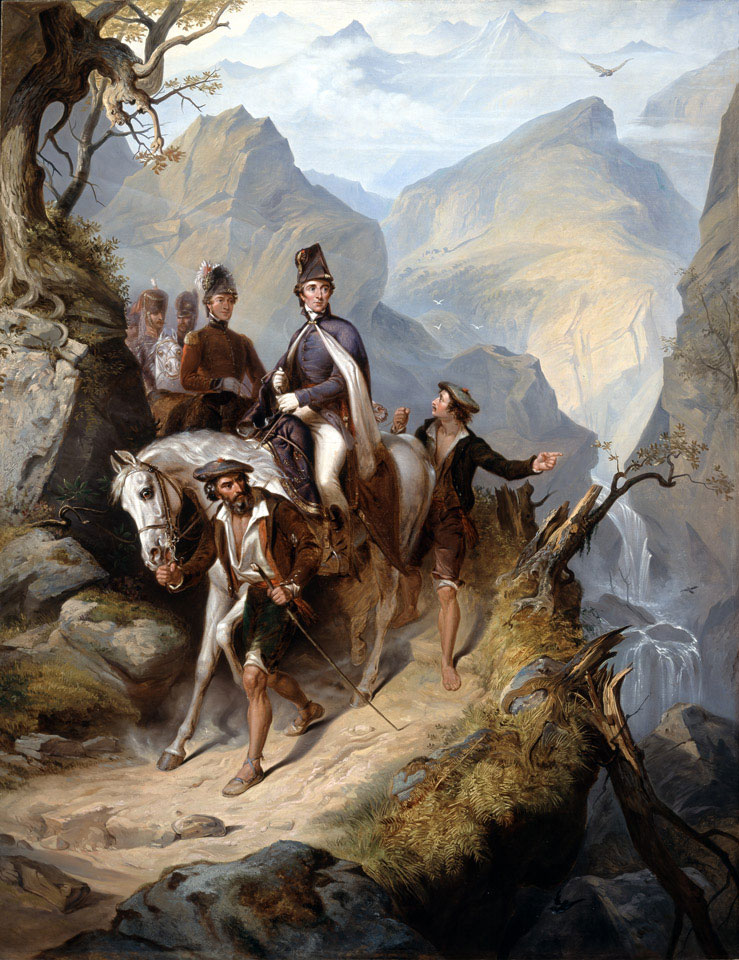
Wellington at Sorauren, c.1853, at the National Army Museum, London, which provides an online essay about the painting.

Barker returned to England in 1845. From that year to 1876, he exhibited 29 paintings at the Royal Academy. He achieved his greatest success as a military painter, both historical and contemporary. Some of his earliest military paintings were scenes from the Napoleonic Wars, including his 1853 Royal Academy piece Wellington at Sorauren.

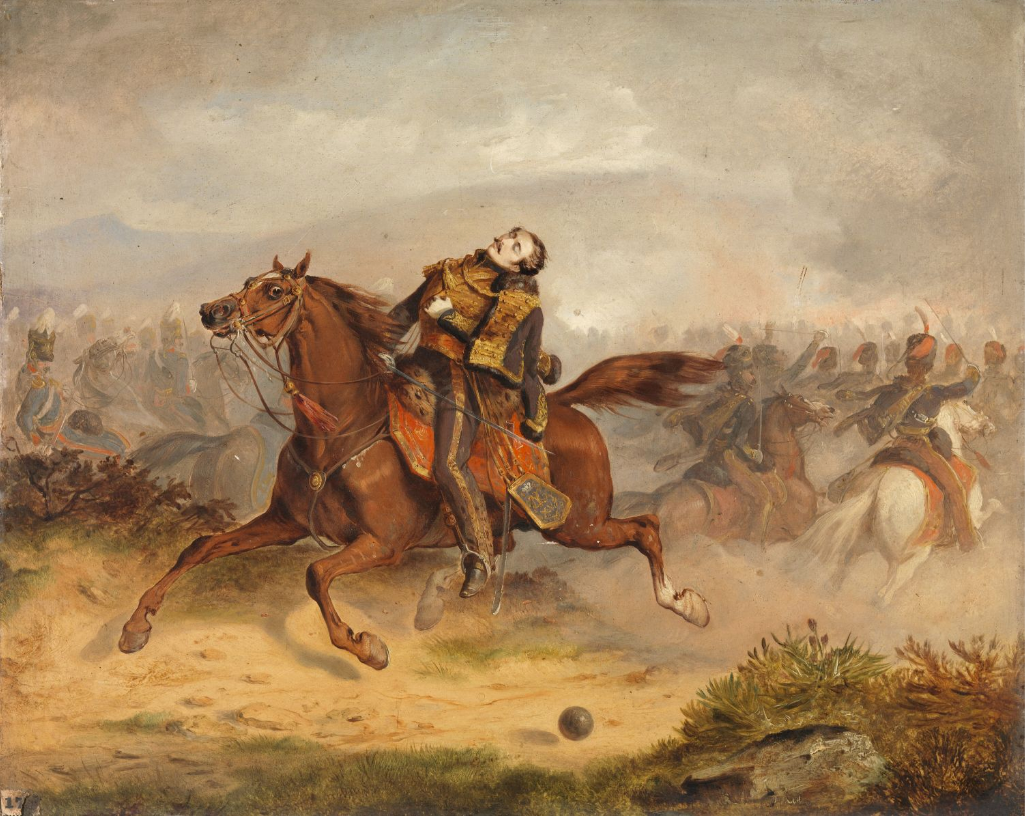
The Charger of Captain Nolan Bearing Back his Dead Master to the British Lines, 1855, National Gallery of Ireland.

In 1870, Barker observed on the spot the Franco-Prussian War, including the Battle of Sedan and the surrender of Napoleon III. It is unclear whether he was a first-hand witness of the Crimean War, but he also exhibited a number of paintings depicting this conflict. An incident from India, The Relief of Lucknow, 1857, completed in 1859, was shown to Queen Victoria in May 1860; heightening the realism were numerous portraits of the chief actors, which Barker based on sketches by Swedish artist Egron Lundgren, who had traveled to India in 1858. Barker made a speciality of painting panoramic images with many figures whose faces were reproduced from actual portraits; when sold as engravings, these would be accompanied by a numbered key identifying the various persons.

A contemporary critic noted that it was such "scenes of modern warfare by which Mr. Barker has chiefly made his reputation, and that have become popular by means of the engraver's aid; many of these pictures have never been exhibited except in the galleries of the printsellers for whom they were painted….the majority are on canvas of very large dimensions."

Despite his popularity and commercial success, and the fact that he "contributed regularly to the Royal Academy and the British Institution….Barker was not favoured by the art critics of his day, nor was he rewarded with membership of the Royal Academy." He nevertheless occupied a pre-eminent place in a particular niche of British art; a retrospective on his 40-year career written in 1878 began, "If England possessed, what France has at Versailles, a gallery almost expressly devoted to a pictorial record of her military exploits, the artist whose works would find the most prominent place in such a collection would assuredly be Mr. T. Jones Barker, who is certainly the Horace Vernet of England.…We can scarcely pay Mr. Baker a greater compliment…he remains master of the battlefield among English artists."

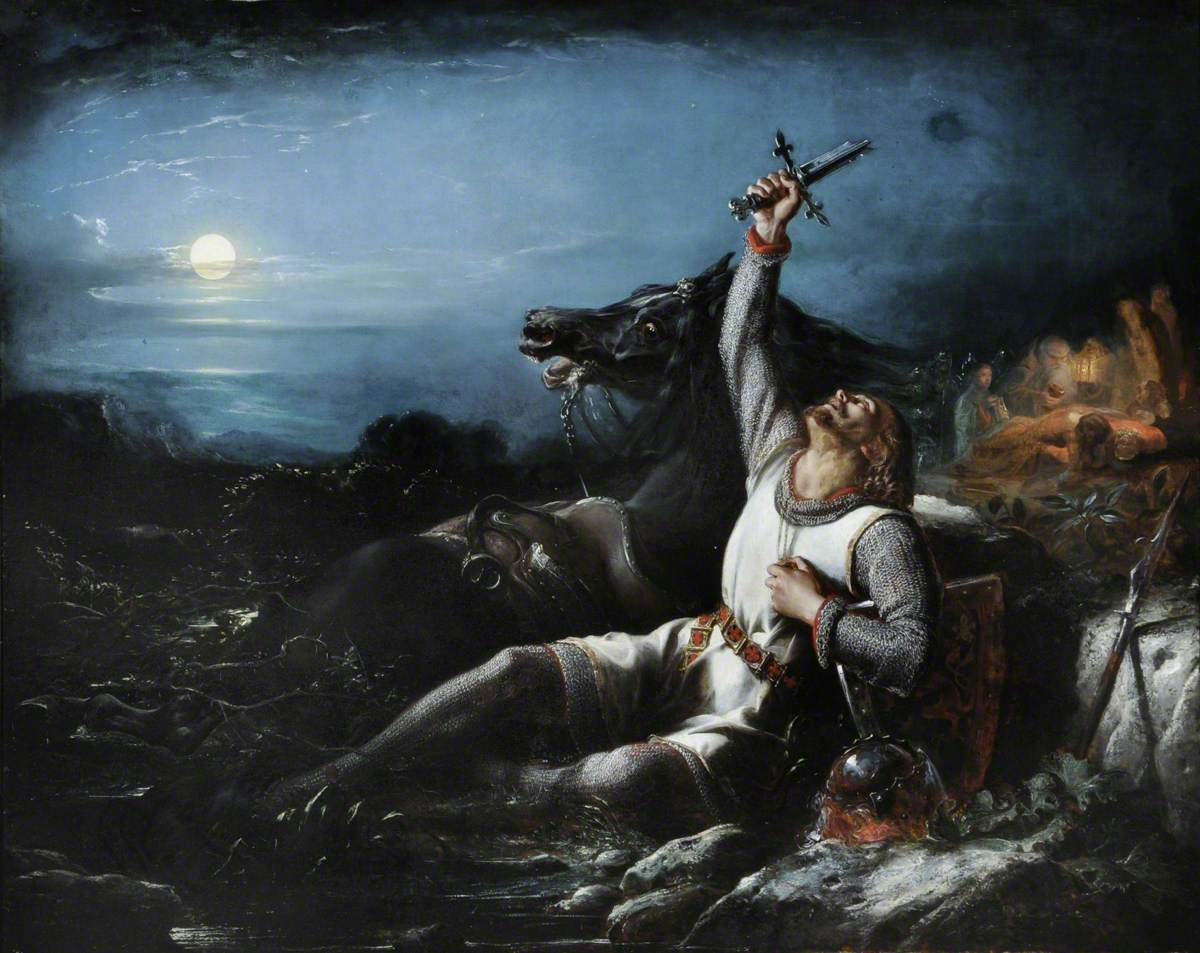
The Faithful Knight, n.d., Museums Sheffield

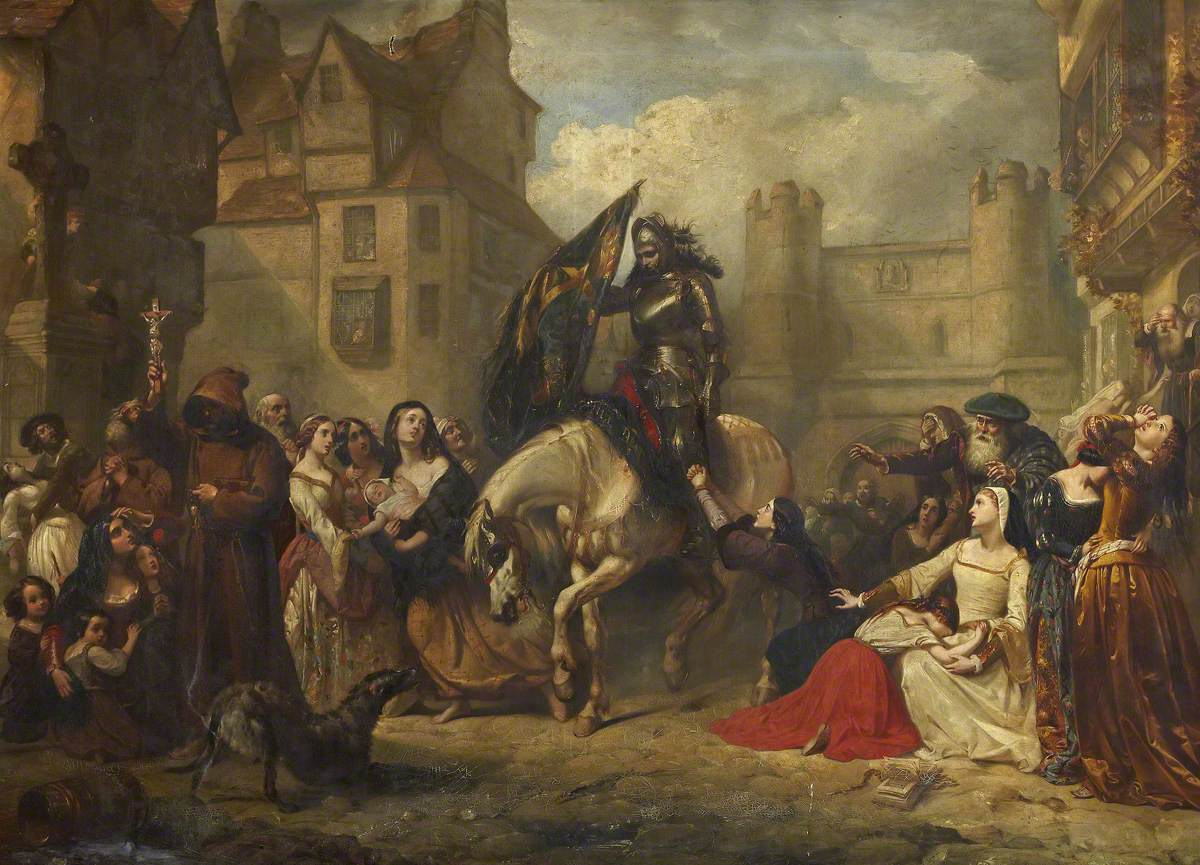
News of Battle: Edinburgh after Flodden, by 1850, St Andrews Museum, Fife

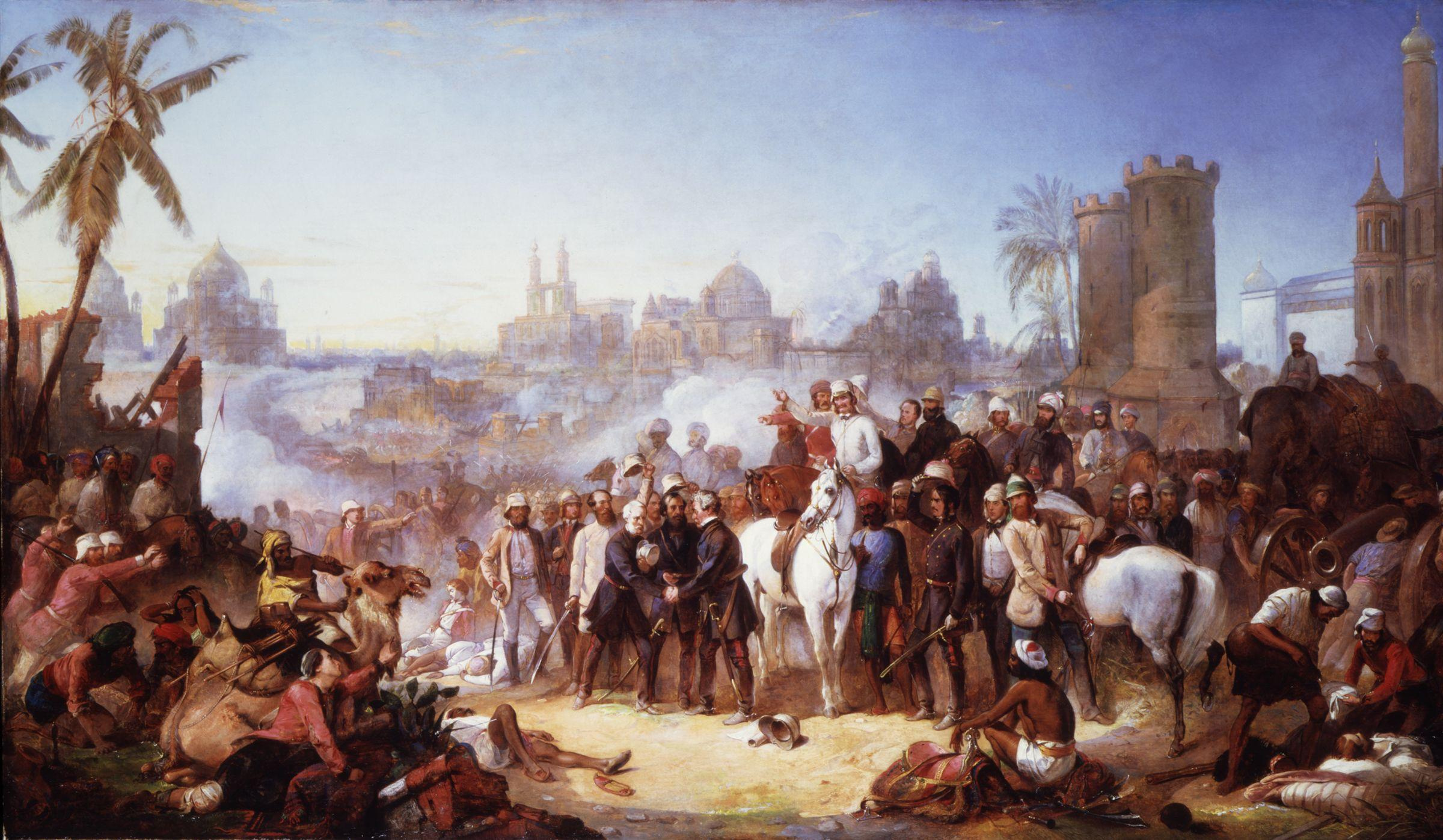
The Relief of Lucknow, 1857, 1859, National Portrait Gallery, London

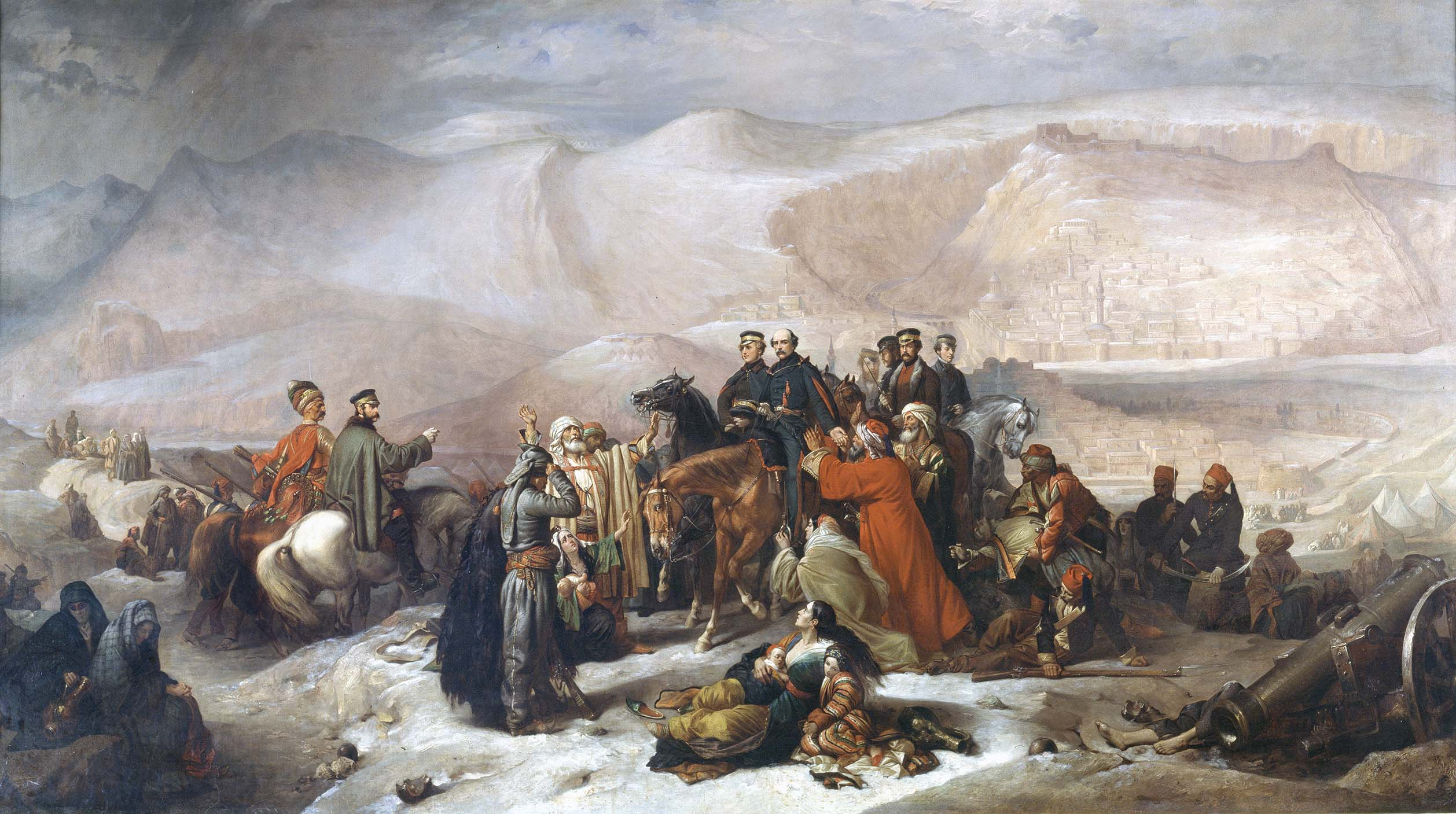
The Capitulation of Kars, 1860, National Army Museum

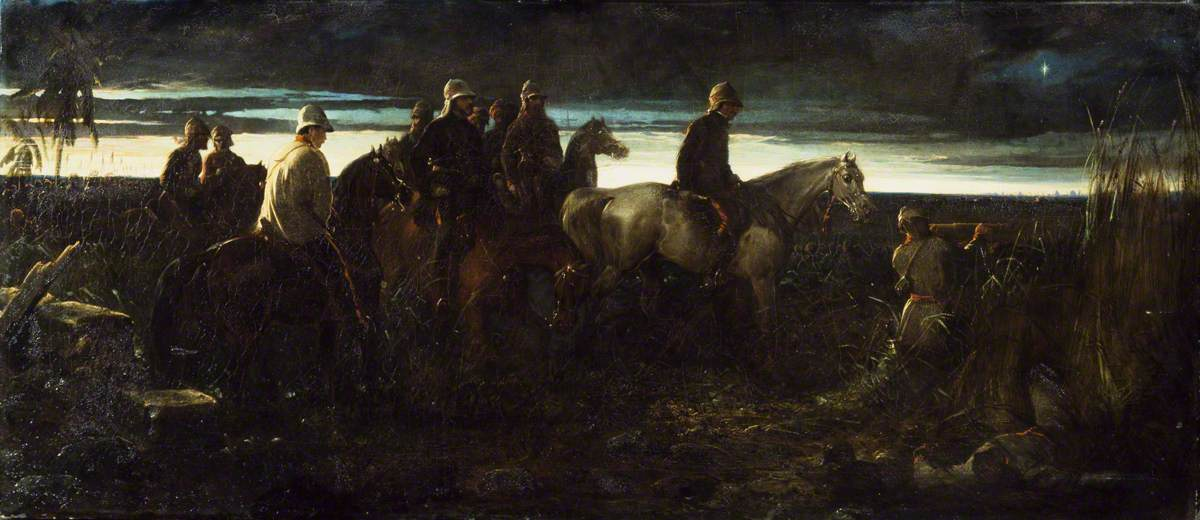
The Dawn of Victory, 1862, National Army Museum

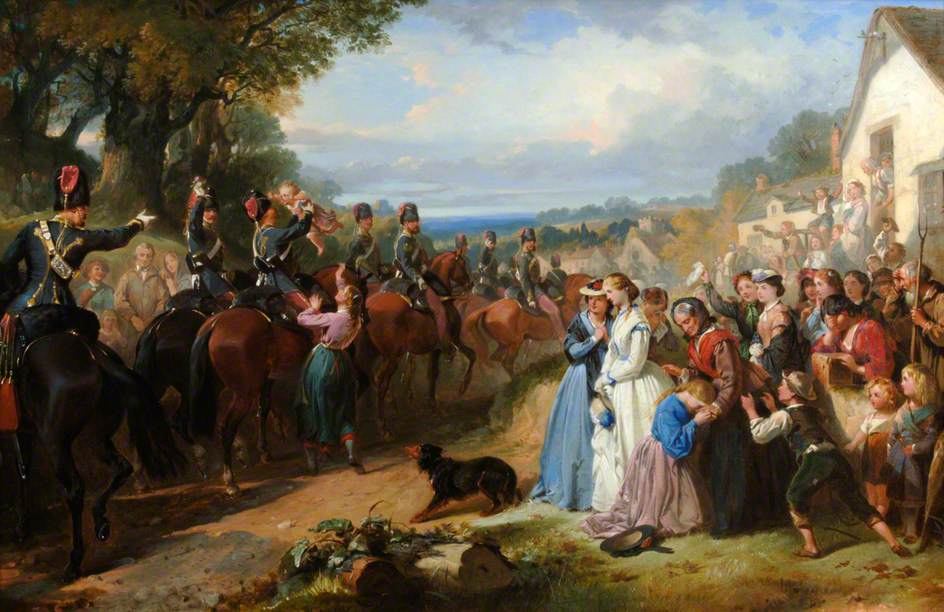
Departure of a Troop of 11th Hussars for India aka The Girls We Left Behind, 1866, HorsePower: The Museum of the King's Royal Hussars

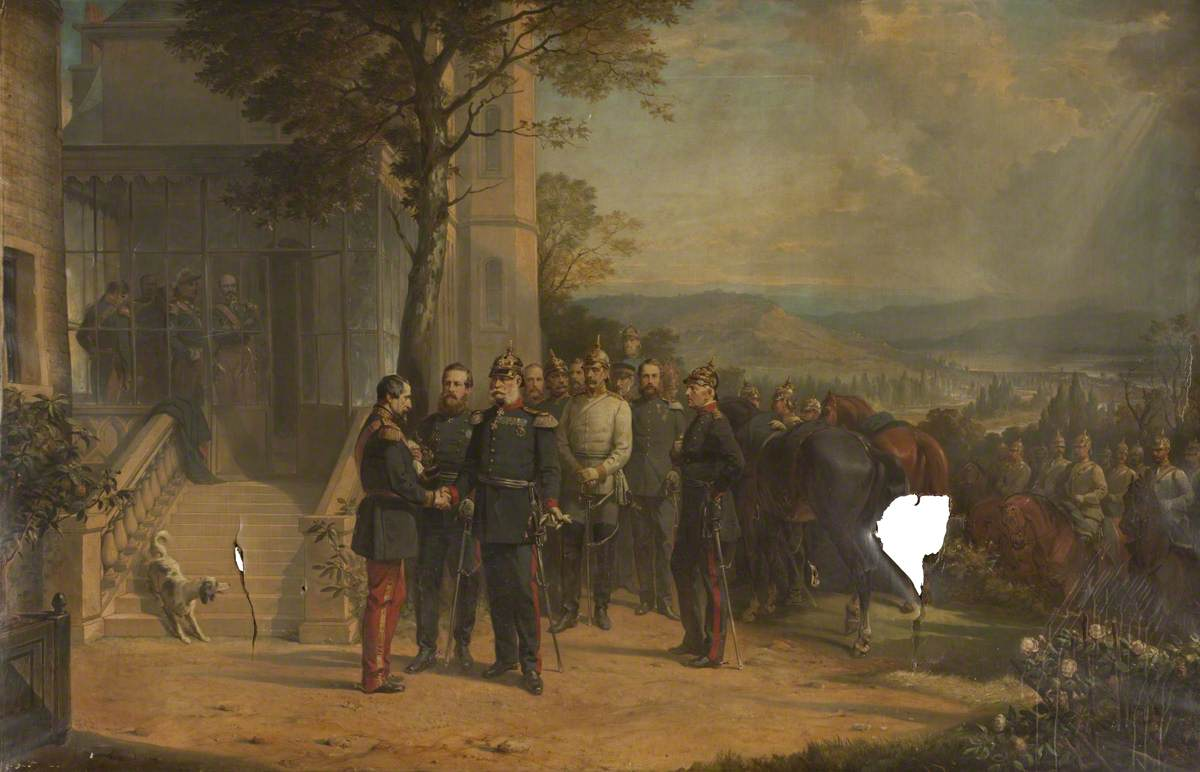
Surrender of Napoleon III at Sedan, 1870, Blackburn Museum and Art Gallery.

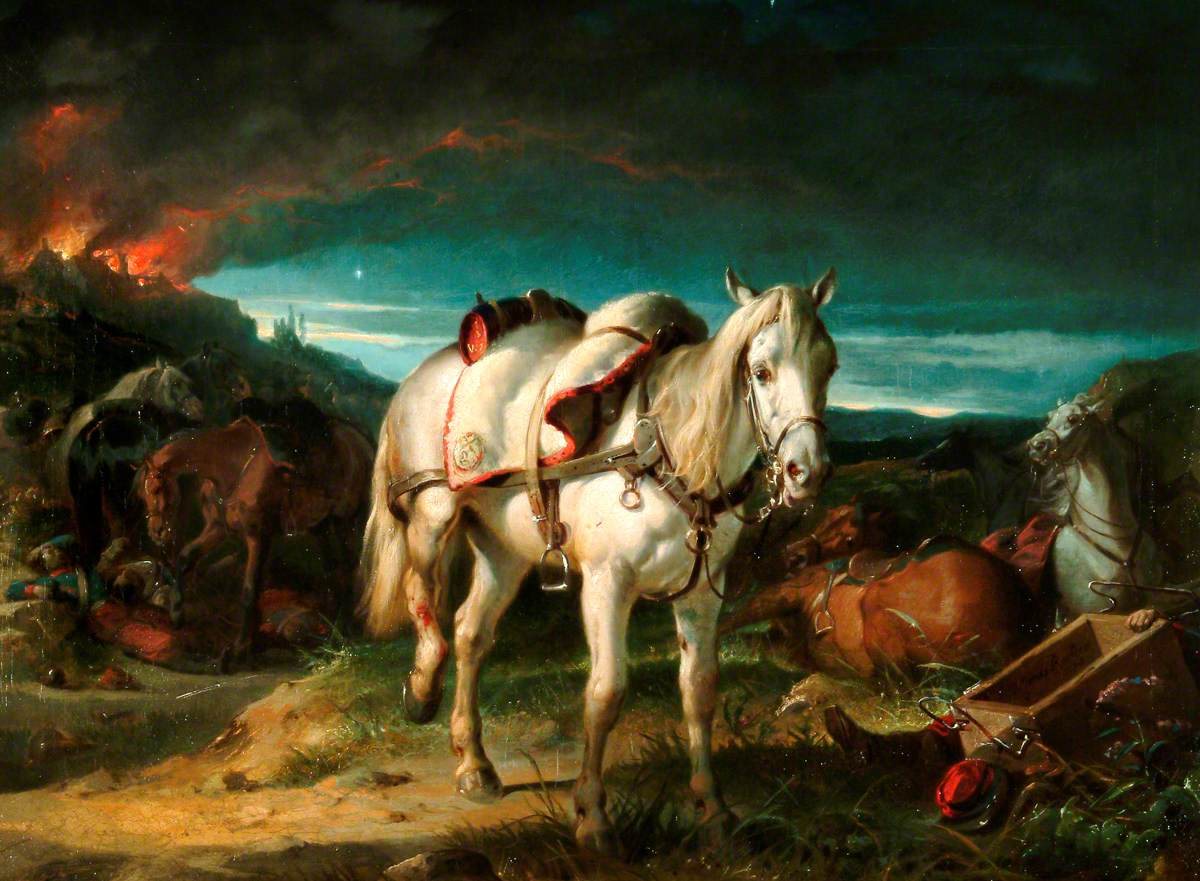
Riderless Horse After the Battle of Sedan, c. 1870, Southampton City Art Gallery

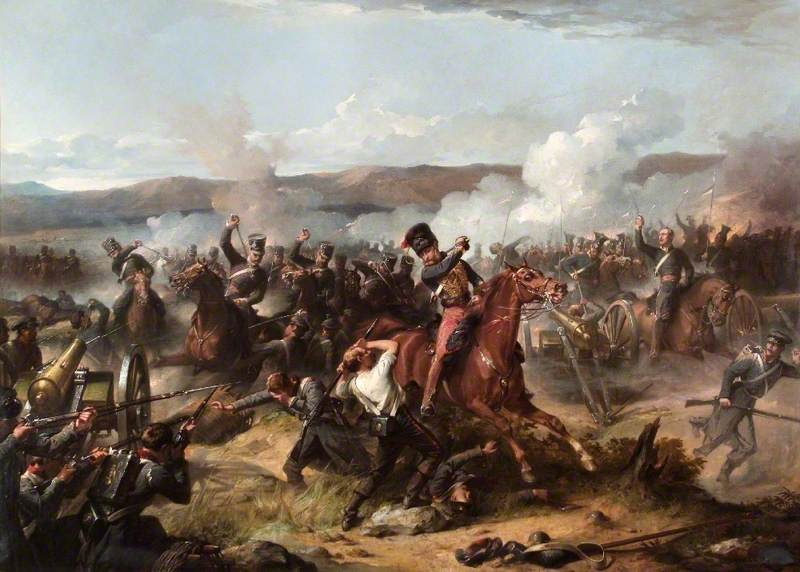
The Charge of the Light Brigade, 1877, Defence Academy of the United Kingdom, Shrivenham

== Career in England: Portraits ==
Throughout his career in England, Barker painted portraits. These included notables such as Disraeli and Garibaldi, but also less exalted figures, as long as they could afford his fees. Barker also specialized in panoramic historical or imaginary gatherings which featured scores of recognizable officials and celebrities, such as The Spa Promenade of 1871.

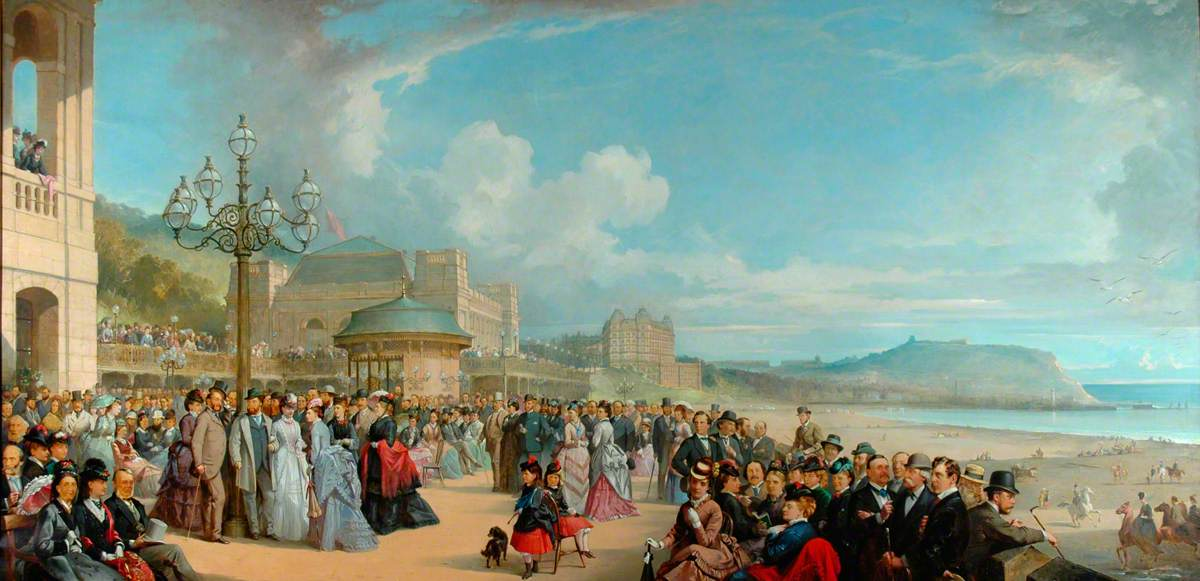
The Spa Promenade, 1871, Scarborough Town Hall
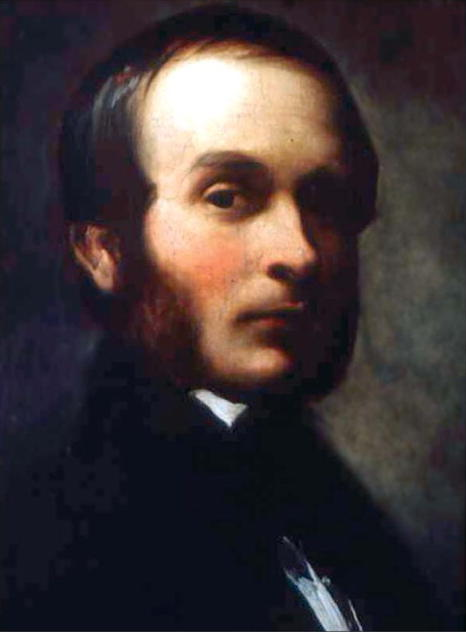
Portrait of Dr. John Snow (detail), 1847, private collection

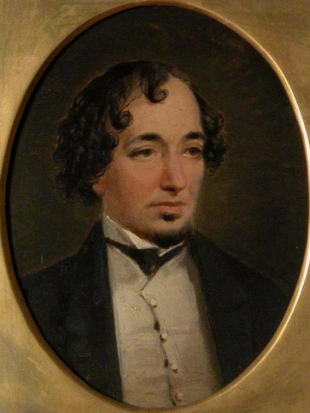
Portrait of Benjamin Disraeli, 1862, Hughenden Manor

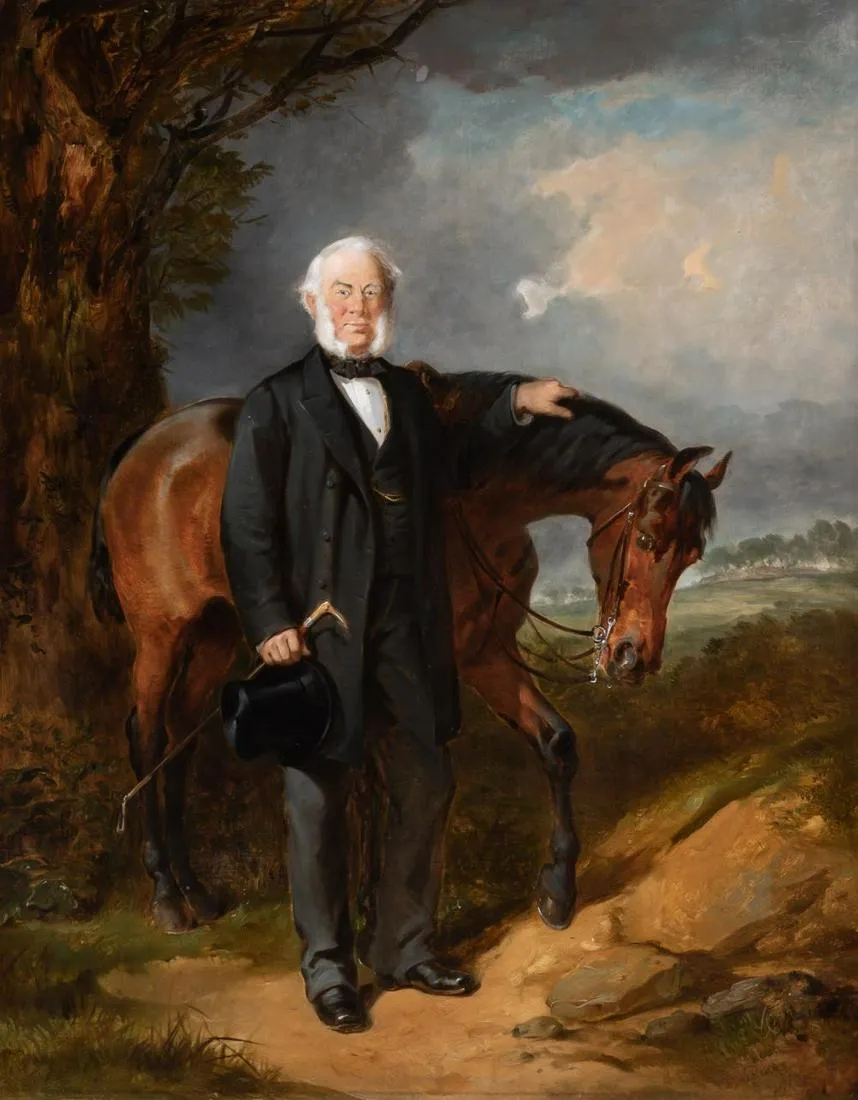
Portrait of a gentleman and his horse, 1870s, private collection

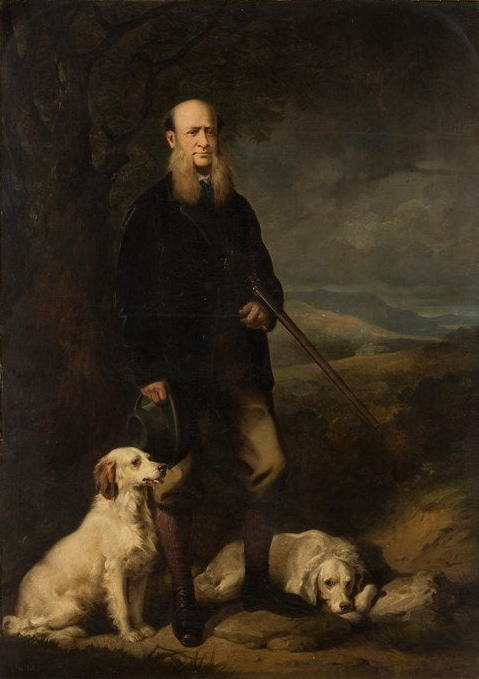
Portrait of a hunter with dogs, 1873, private collection

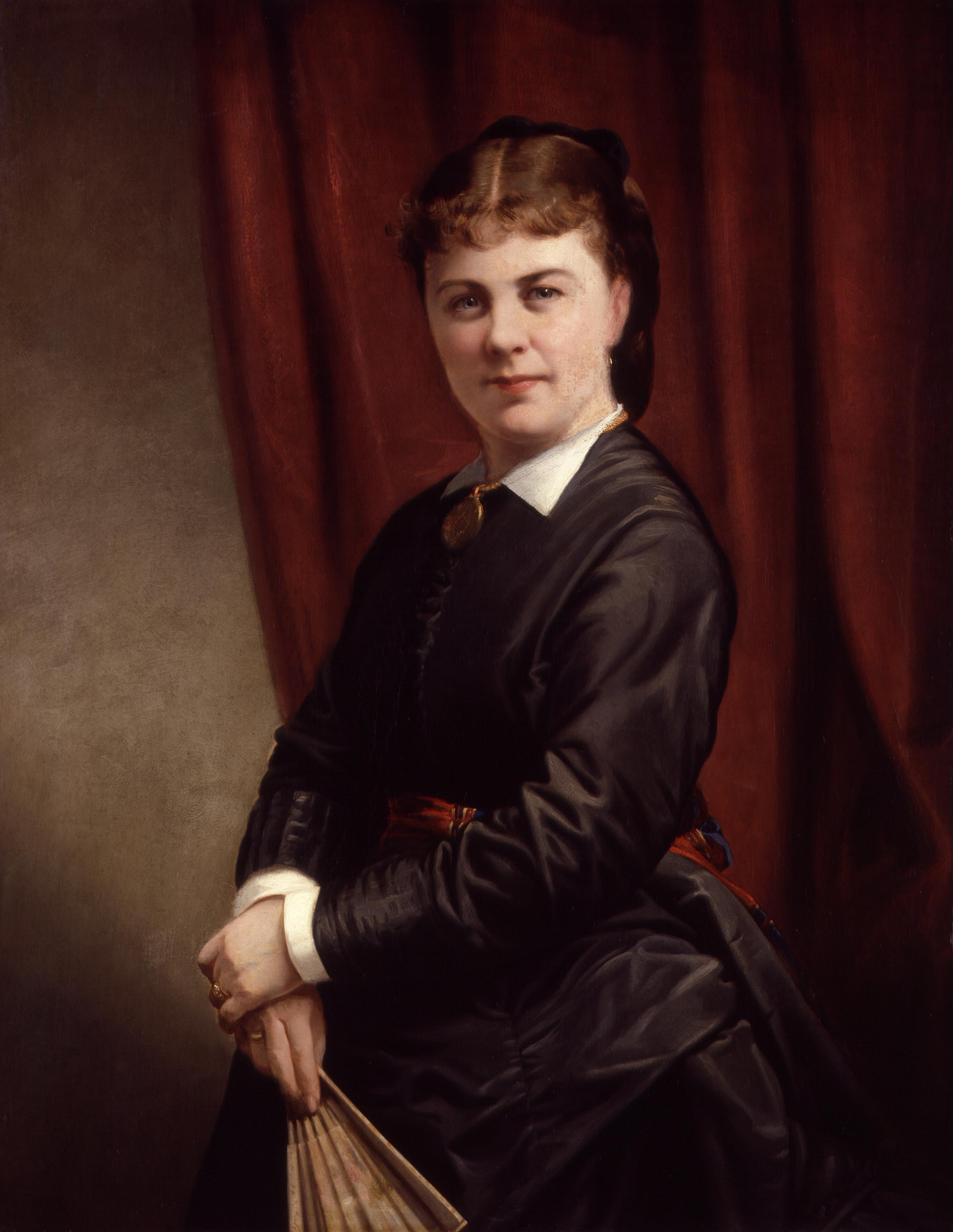
Marie Effie (née Wilton), Lady Bancroft, c. 1870s-1882, National Portrait Gallery, London

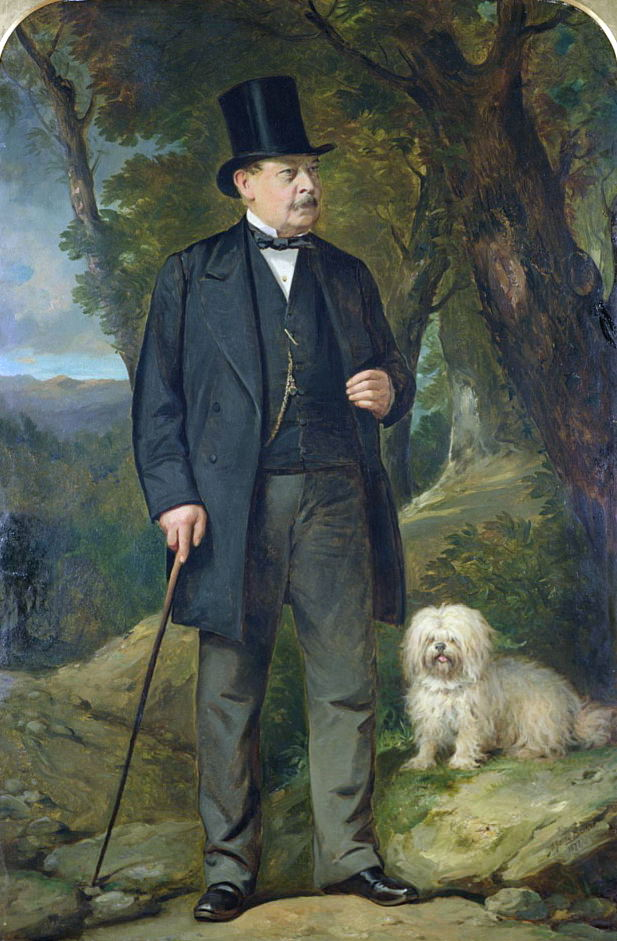
Portrait of John Newton Mappin (1800–1884) 1877, Museums Sheffield

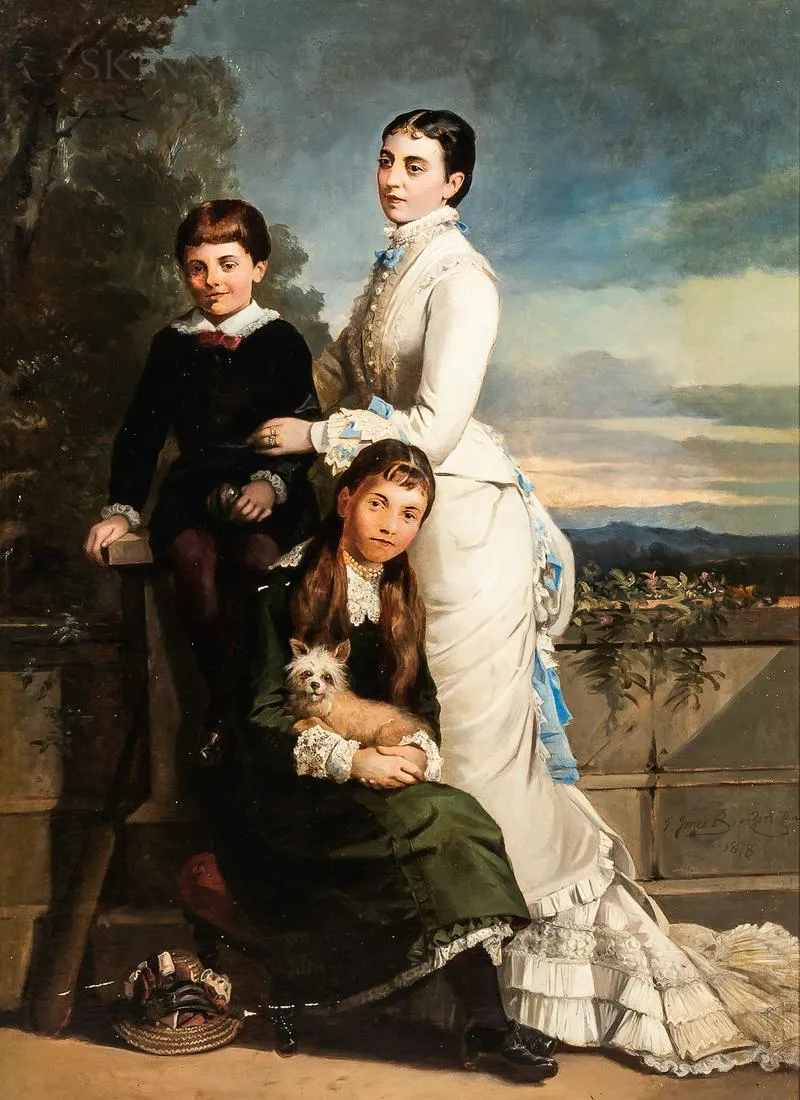
Portrait of a woman, two children, and terrier, 1878, private collection

=== The Secret of England's Greatness ===
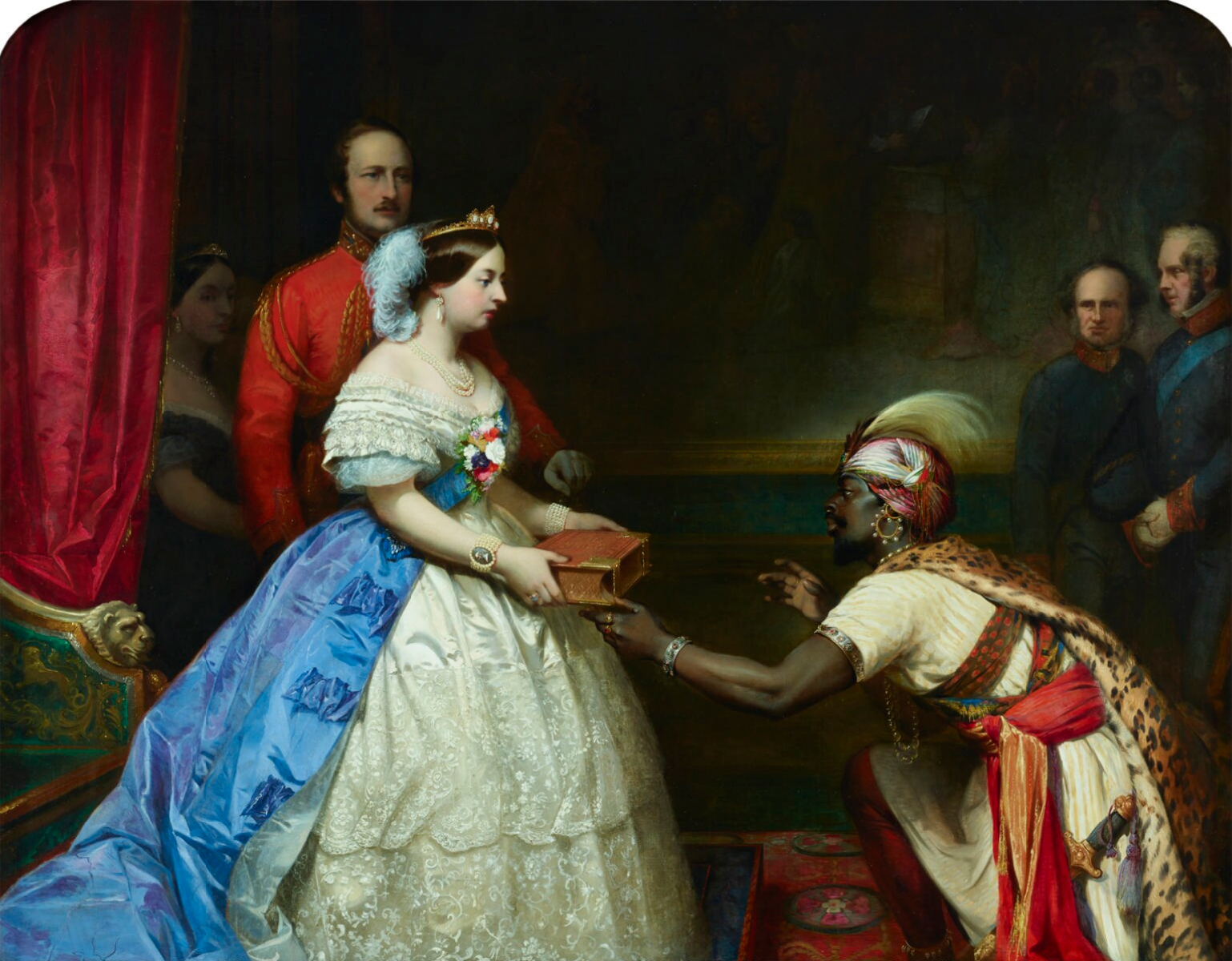
The Secret of England's Greatness, c. 1862–1863, National Portrait Gallery, London.

Painted c. 1862–1863, The Secret of England's Greatness "toured northern England and Ulster…Though popular in its day, subsequently it was virtually forgotten. Following its purchase by the National Portrait Gallery in 1974, it became a favourite late twentieth-century icon of Victorianism, much reproduced in books, and Barker's best-known painting."

The painting stirred fresh popular and scholarly interest when it was presented in 2005 and 2006 as part of the exhibit Black Victorians: Black People in British Art, 1800–1900 at the Manchester Art Gallery and the Birmingham Museum and Art Gallery. In the exhibition's catalogue and companion book, an essay by Jan Marsh, "Icon of the Age: 'Africa', Victoria and The Secret of England's Greatness," examined the painting at length, and prompted other art historians and social scientists to do likewise. It has become Barker's most discussed, deconstructed, and controversial painting work.

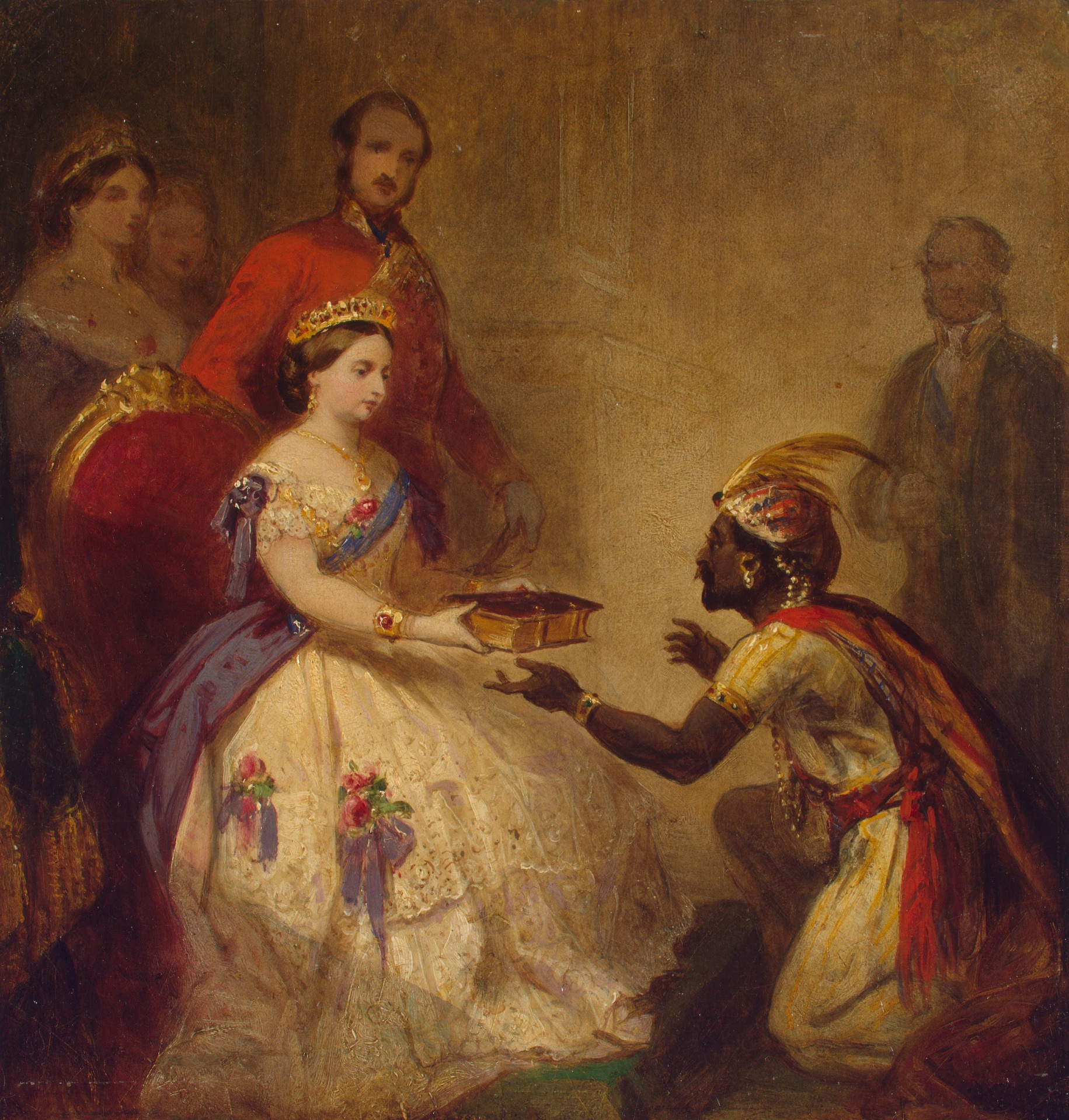
Oil on cardboard study for The Secret of England's Greatness, c. 1861, The Hermitage.

Lynda Nead in the Journal of Victorian Culture wrote: "Both the image and its title are emphatic and unambiguous…should there be any remaining traces of uncertainty, however, there is a sub-title: Queen Victoria Presenting a Bible in the Audience Chamber at Windsor….although the subject depicted can be related to various colonial visits during Victoria’s reign, it is unlikely that the specific event that is depicted ever took place. It is an 'apocryphal anecdote'…." Barker may have been inspired by an image that appeared in 1859 on the front page of the British Workman, in a story that purported to recount the visit of an African ambassador sent by his monarch to discover the secret of England's greatness. Victoria "did not…show the ambassador her diamonds and her jewels, and her rich ornaments, but handing him a beautifully bound copy of the Bible, she said, 'Tell the Prince that THIS IS THE SECRET OF ENGLAND’S GREATNESS.'"

On a formal level, "the arrangement in the painting of the two protagonists recalls a number of iconic visual precedents such as the visit of the Magi to the Virgin and Child, whilst the kneeling black figure is reminiscent of the typical Abolitionist depiction of the freed slave.…Everything in the painting converges at the point where white hands and black hands nearly, but never, must never meet, over the transference of the Bible."

The painting stirred more discussion when it was prominently included in the exhibition Artist and Empire: Facing Britain's Imperial Past at the Tate Britain in 2015 and 2016.

A set of figurines based on the image was produced by the toy company Royal Express.

== Death ==
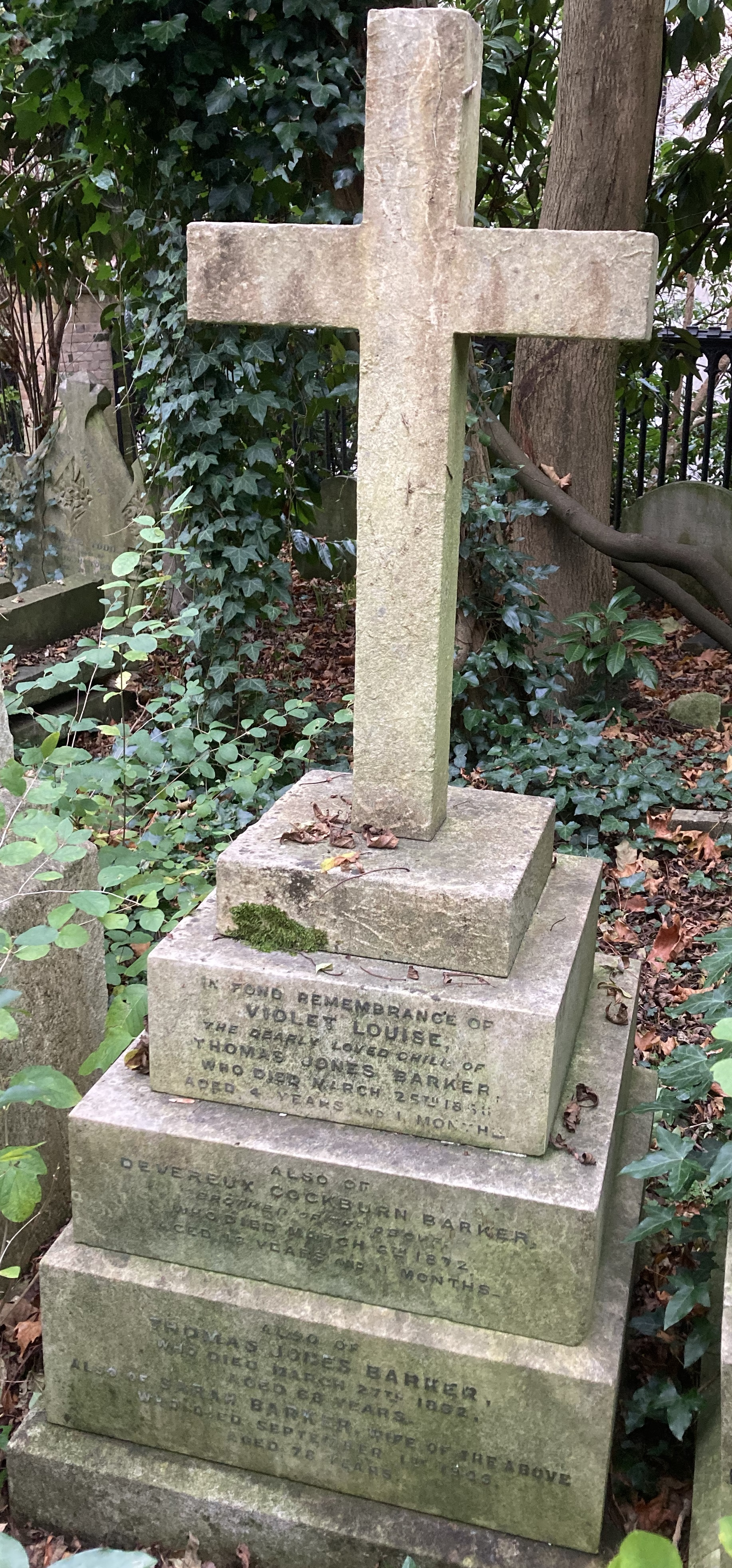
Family grave of Thomas Jones Barker in Highgate Cemetery (west side)

Barker died at his Hampstead home, 32 Steeles Road, on 27 March 1882 at the age of 68, and was buried in a family grave on the western side of Highgate Cemetery (plot no 15902).

== At auction ==
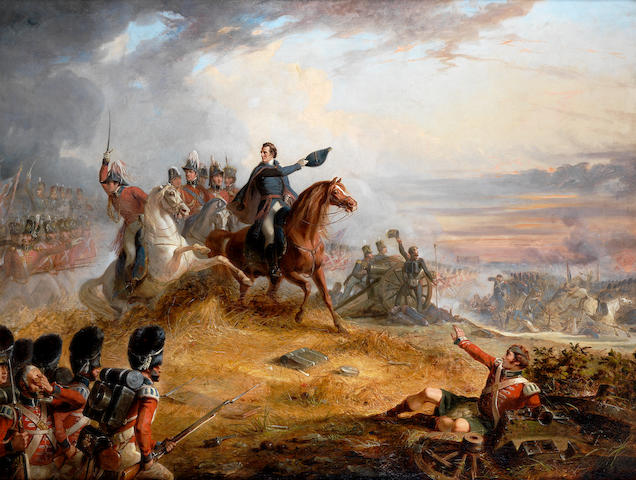
The Battle of Waterloo, undated, private collection.

An auction record for a Barker painting was set in 2015, when Barker's Battle of Waterloo sold for £50,000 at Bonham's in London. The Bonham's catalogue reiterated Barker's primacy as a depicter of military history:

Right in the centre of Barker's composition Wellington is instantly identifiable giving his famous order with an authoritative wave of his cockade whilst Maitland, pictured to the Duke's left, is echoing the order with an upward slash of his sword. It's a dramatic scene that captures the swirling maelstrom of battle whilst at the same time depicting with utter clarity the moment when the decisive command was issued, the artist offering the viewer an opportunity to witness this significant moment first hand. Waterloo is a battle remembered in popular consciousness for a number of significant moments—the charge of the Union Brigade, the defence of Hougoumont and the repeated attacks of the French cavalry—all of which have been celebrated in famous paintings of national importance. Barker's monumental work can be adjudged to be in the same class and is certainly the most significant artistic depiction of one of Waterloo's most significant moments.

== Gallery of the Barker Family ==
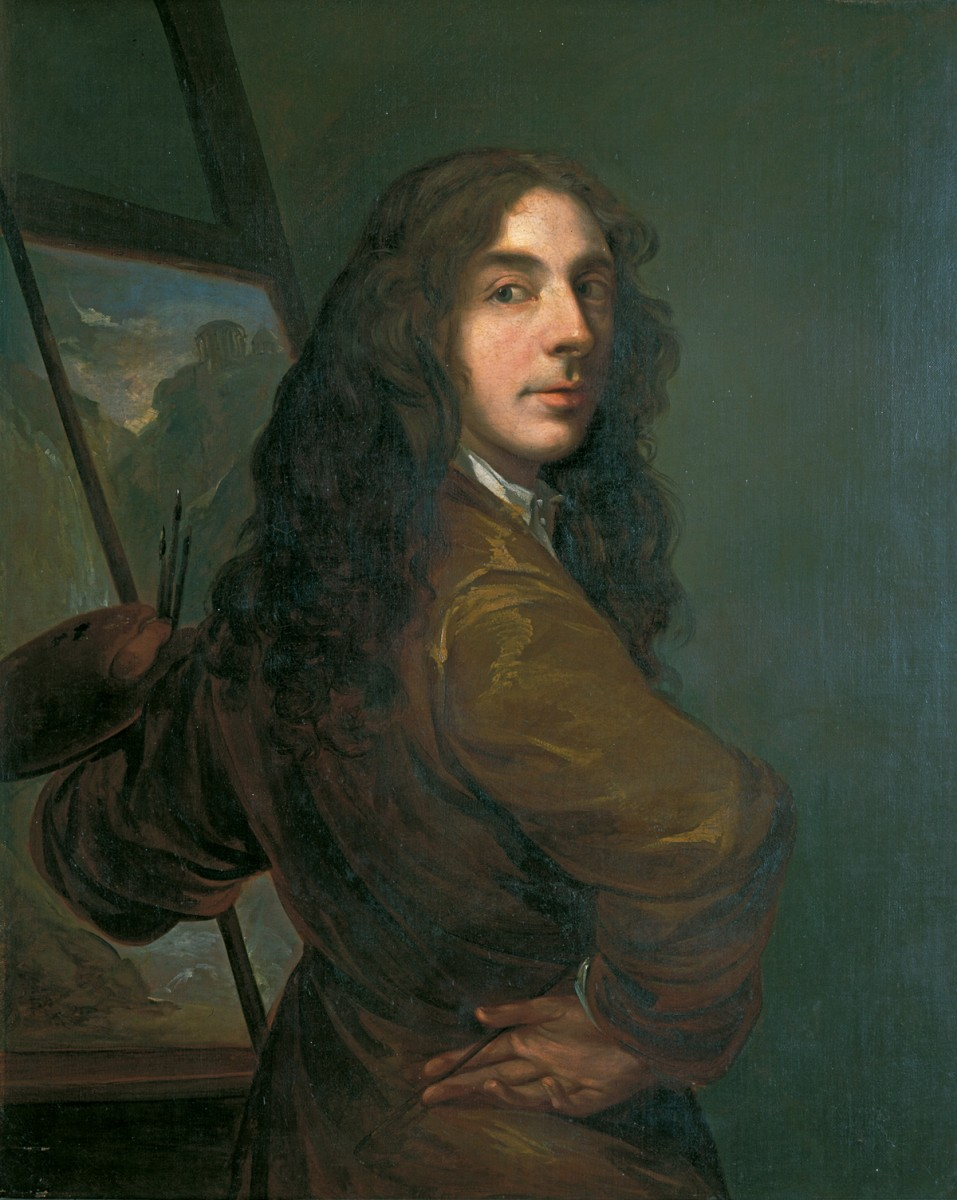
Thomas Barker (father of Thomas Jones Barker), Self-Portrait, c. 1794, Holburne Museum

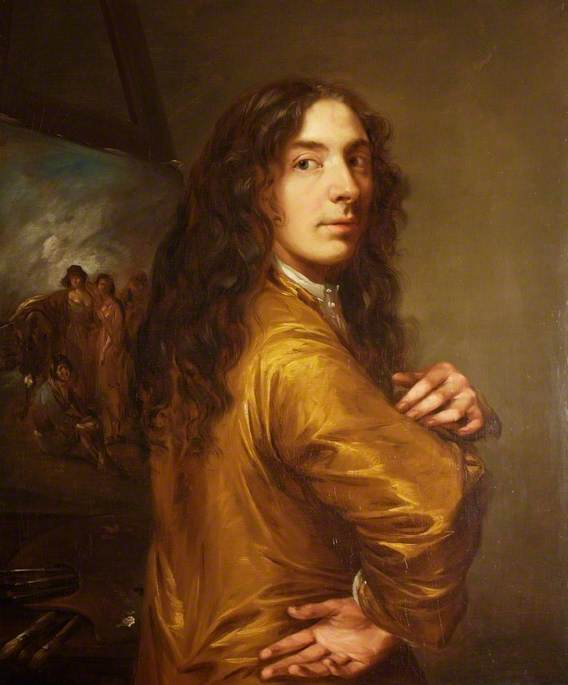
Thomas Barker, Self-Portrait, c. 1796, No. 1 Royal Crescent, Bath

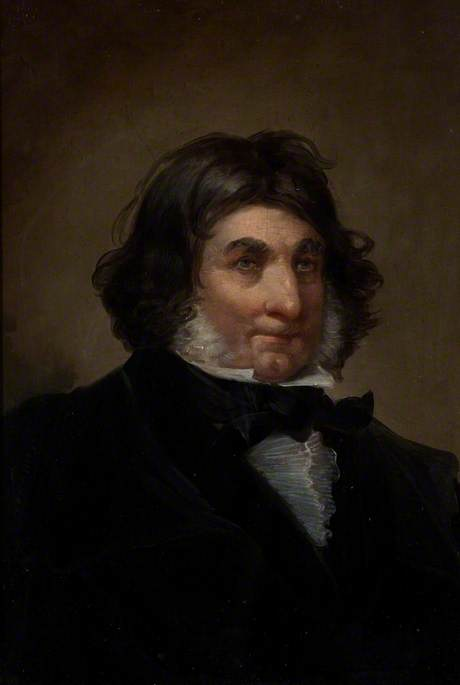
Thomas Barker, Self-Portrait, n.d., Victoria Art Gallery

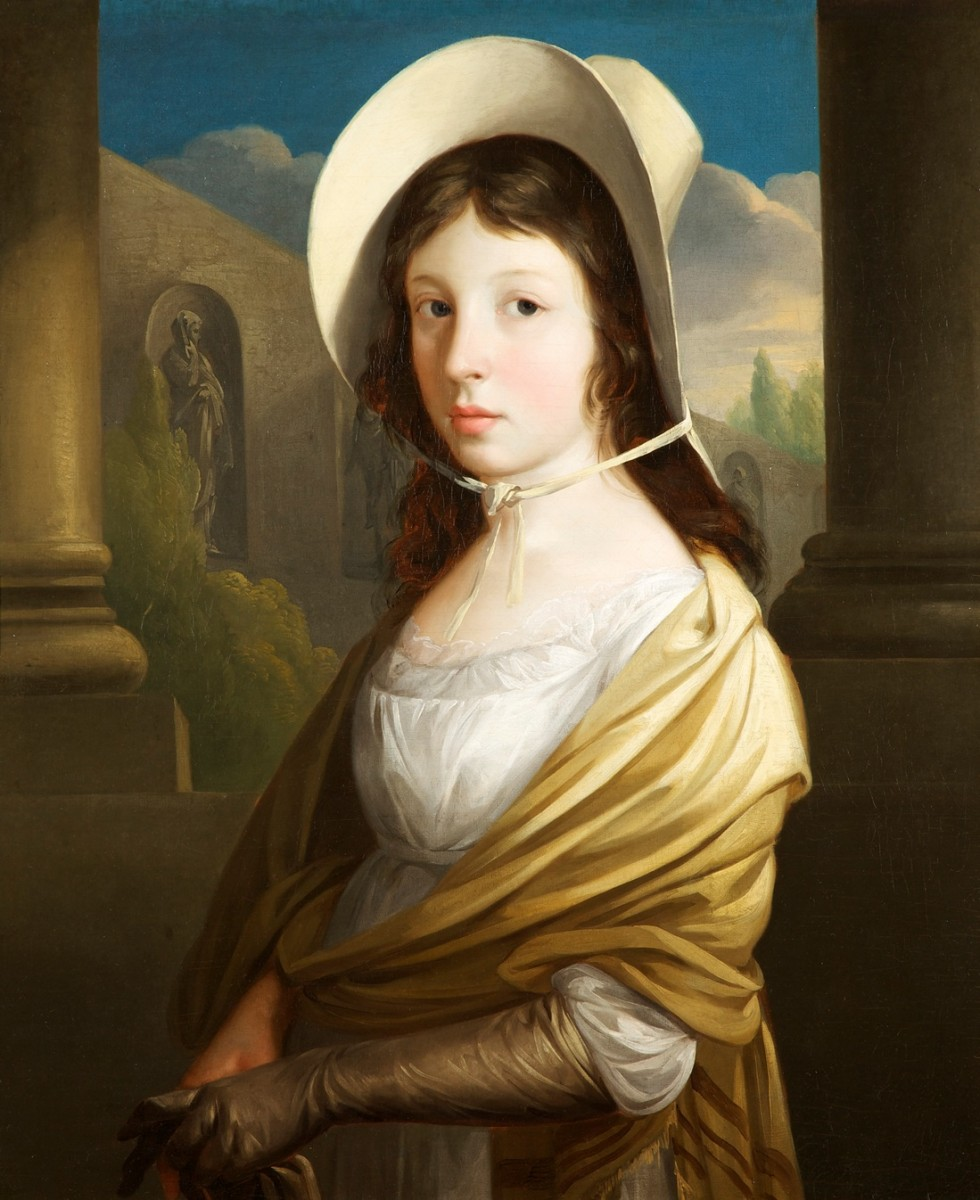
Thomas Barker, Portrait of Priscilla Jones (later his wife and the mother of Thomas Jones Barker), c. 1802, Holburne Museum

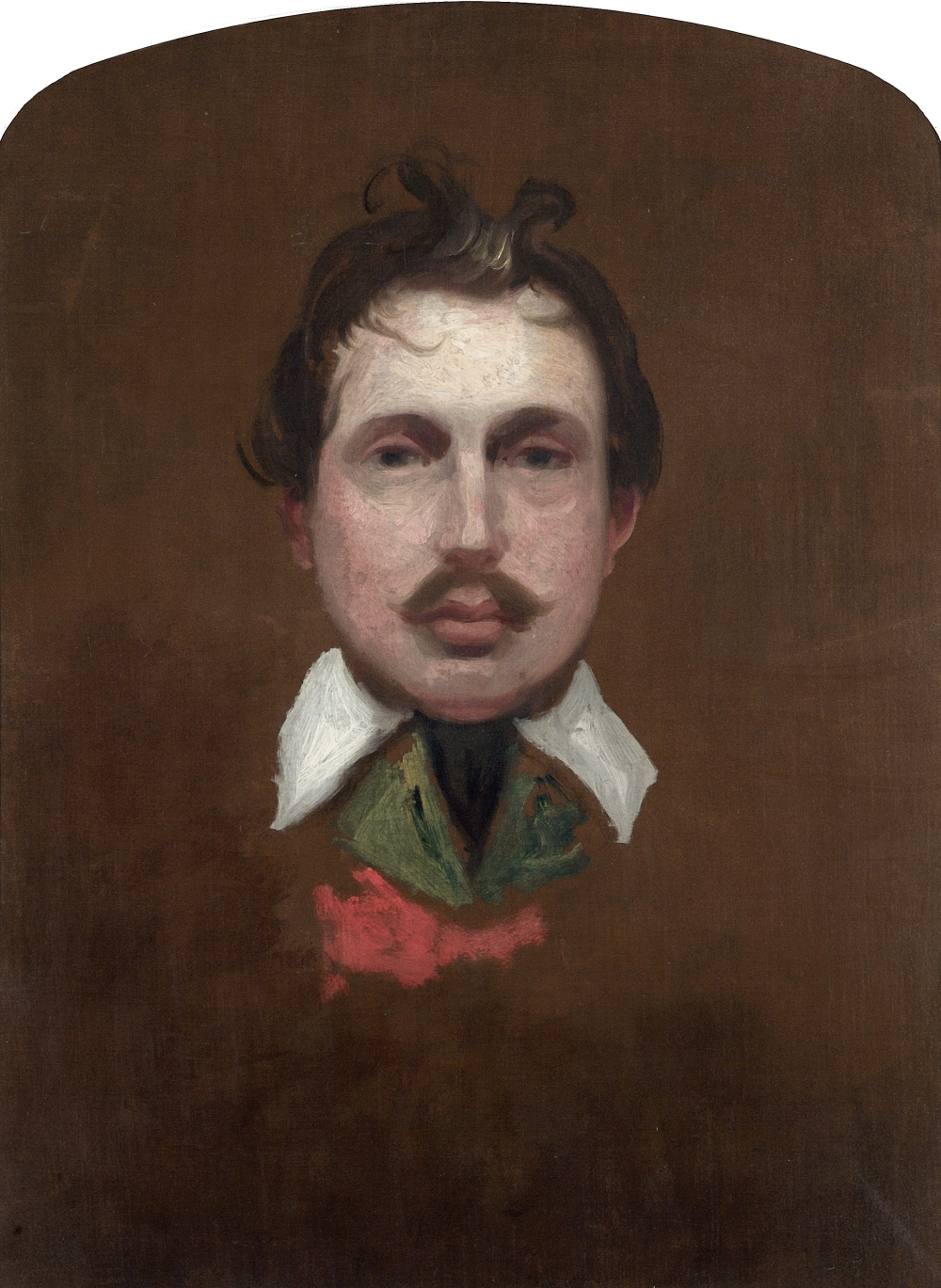
Benjamin Barker Jr. (uncle of Thomas Jones Barker), Self-Portrait, n.d., Victoria Art Gallery

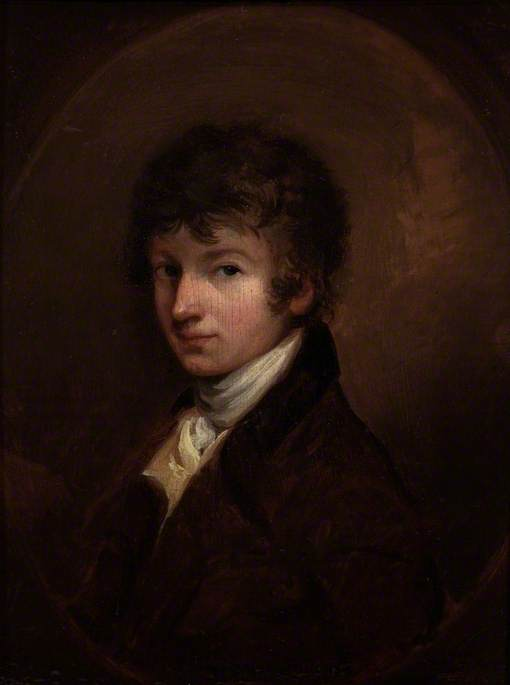
Benjamin Barker, Jr., Portrait of Joseph Barker (both were uncles of Thomas Jones Barker), c. 1800, Victoria Art Gallery

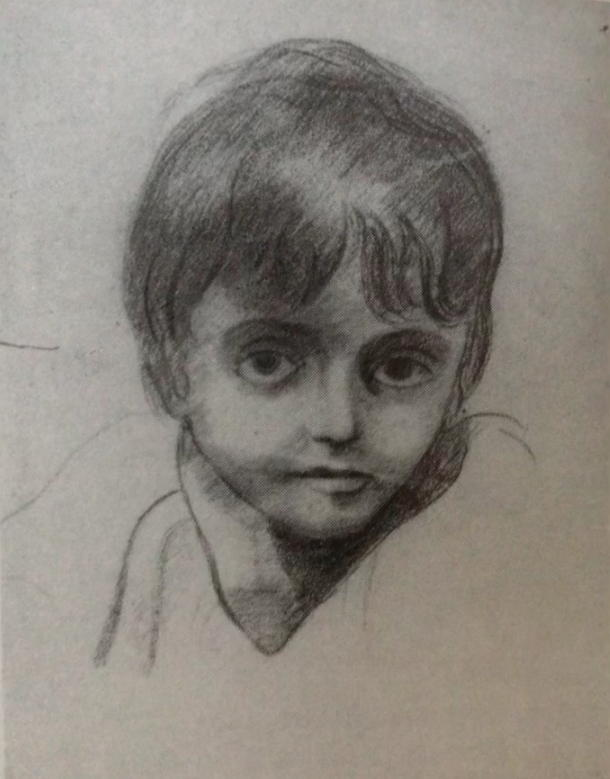
Thomas Barker, portrait of his son Thomas Jones Barker, c. 1820, Victoria Art Gallery

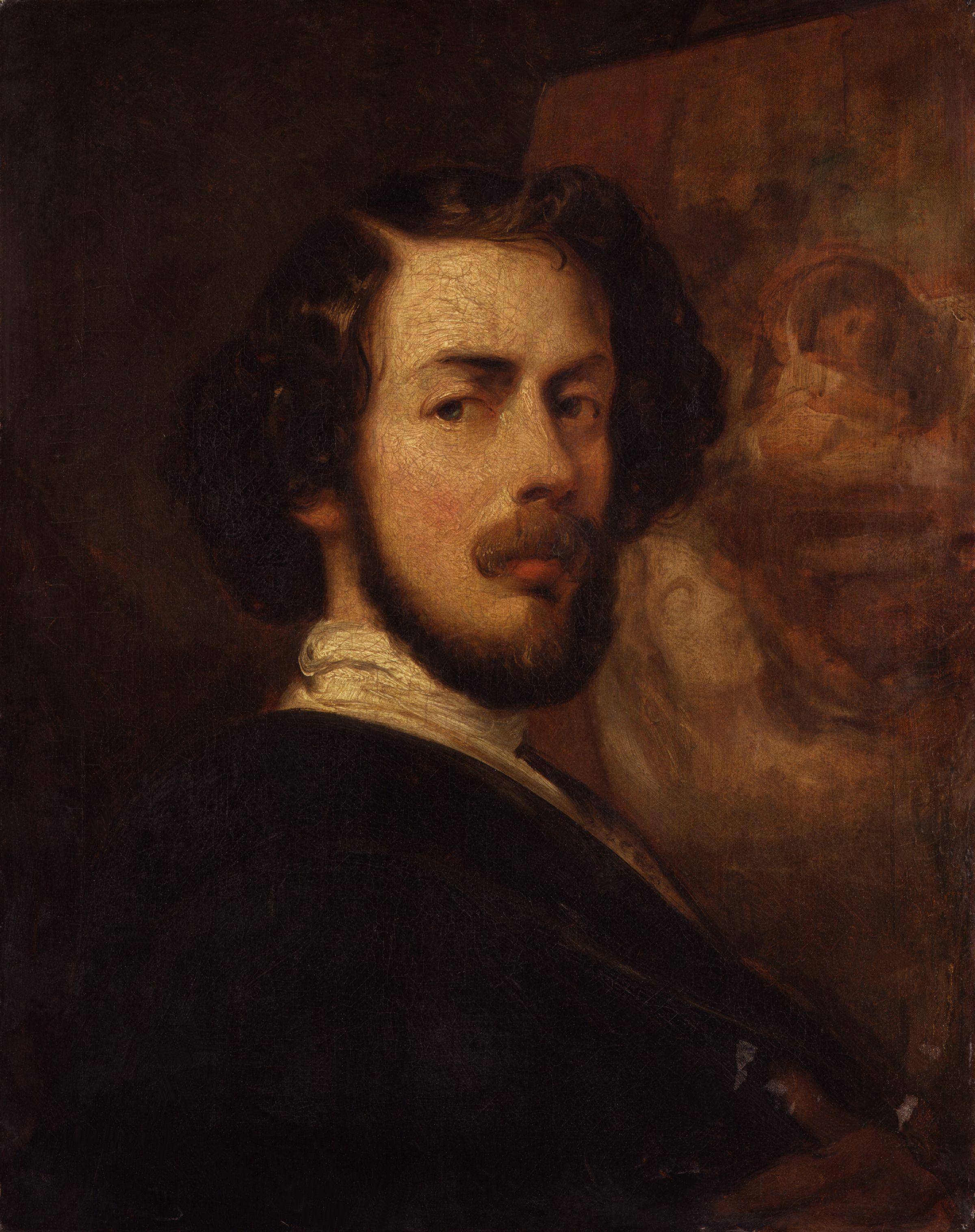
Thomas Jones Barker, Self-Portrait, 1848, National Portrait Gallery, London

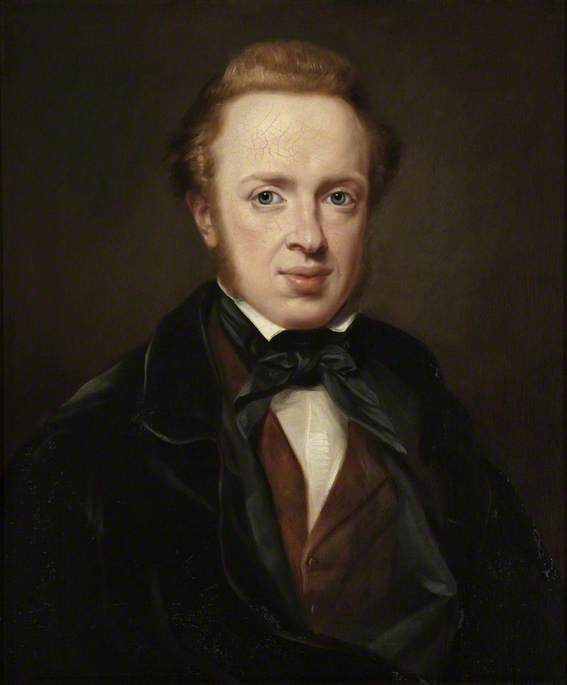
Thomas Jones Barker, Self-Portrait, n.d., Victoria Art Gallery

== Sources ==
- Anchor, Rachel. "Fidelity or Fiction? Elizabeth Thompson's Balaclava and the Art of Re-construction", The British Art Journal, Vol. 12, No. 2 (Autumn 2011), pp. 58–62.
- "Barker" entry in Explication des ouvrages de peinture, sculpture, architecture, gravure et lithographie des artistes vivants, exposé au Musée Royal le 15 Mars 1841 (catalogue of the Paris Salon), Paris: Vinchon, 1841, p. 18.
- "Barker (Thomas-Jones-Henry)" entry in Explication des ouvrages de peinture et dessins, sculpture, architecture et gravure des artistes vivants, exposé au Musée Royal le 15 Mars 1842 (catalogue of the Paris Salon), Paris: Vinchon, 1842, p. 10.
- The Barkers of Bath, catalogue of an exhibition held at the Victoria Art Gallery, Bath, 17 May-28 June 1986; introduction by Ian Fleming-Williams; Bath: Bath Museums Service, 1986.
- Barryte, Bernard. "History and Legend in T.J. Barker's The Studio of Salvator Rosa in the Mountains of the Abruzzi, 1865", The Art Bulletin, Vol. 71, No. 4 (Dec. 1989), pp. 660–673.
- Bénézit, Emmanuel. "BARKER (Thomas-Jones)" in Dictionnaire des peintres, sculpteurs, dessinateurs et graveurs, Paris: Librairie Gründ, 1939, vol. I, p. 368.
- Cabezas, Hervé. "La Mort de Louis XIV au palais de Versailles, par Thomas Jones Barker (1813–1882). L'esquisse d'un tableau offert à Louis-Philippe, au musée Antoine-Lécuyer de Saint-Quentin," La Revue des musées de France. Revue du Louvre, number 4, (2016), pp. 75–84.
- Dafforne, James. "British Artists: Thomas Jones Barker", The Art Journal, New Series, Vol. 4 (1878), pp. 97–100.
- Destigny, J.-F. Revue poétique du Salon de 1841, Paris, 1841, pp. 121–124.
- Empson, Charles. Memoranda Relative to The Bride of Death, a Picture Painted by Thomas Jones Barker, of Paris (Son of Thomas Barker, Esq., of Bath). Bath: The Museum, Terrace Walk, Orange Grove, 1845.
- Graves, Algernon. "Barker, Thomas Jones" (entry on pp. 114–115) in The Royal Academy of Arts; a Complete Dictionary of Contributors and Their Work from Its Foundation in 1769 to 1904, Vol. I, London: H. Graves and Co. Ltd. and George Bell and Sons, 1905.
- Harrington, Peter. "The Defence of Kars: Paintings by William Simpson and Thomas Jones Barker", Journal of the Society for Army Historical Research, Vol. LXIX, No. 277 (Spring 1991), pp. 22–28.
- Hueffer, Ford Madox (aka Ford Madox Ford). Ancient Lights and Certain New Reflections, Being the Memories of a Young Man, London: Chapman and Hall, Ltd., 1911.
- Karr, Alphonse. Les Guêpes, Paris: Longe Lévy & Cie., April 1842.
- Harrington, Peter. British Artists and War: The Face of Battle in Paintings and Prints, 1700–1914, London: Greenhill, 1993.
- MacCulloch, Laura. "Re-evaluating the 'Outsider': Ford Madox Brown and Cultural Dialogues in Mid-Nineteenth Century Europe" in Artists and Migration 1400–1850: Britain, Europe, and Beyond, ed. Wagner, David, and Klemenčič, Newcastle upon Tyne: Cambridge Scholars Publishing, 2017, pp. 112–126.
- McCallum, Iain. Thomas Barker of Bath: The Artist and His Circle, Bath: Millstream Books, 2003.
- Marsh, Jan. "Icon of the Age: 'Africa', Victoria and The Secret of England's Greatness" in Black Victorians: Black People in British Art, 1800–1900, exhibition catalogue and essays edited by Jan Marsh, published in conjunction with an exhibition held at the Manchester Art Gallery 1 October 2005 – 6 January 2006, and the Birmingham Museum and Art Gallery 28 January – 2 April 2006; Aldershot, Hampshire and Burlington, Vermont: Lund Humphries, 2005, pp. 57–67.
- Nead, Lynda. "The Secret of England’s Greatness"," Journal of Victorian Culture, vol. 19, issue 2 (June 2014), pp. 161–182.
- Nilsson, Sten. "Egron Lundgren, Reporter of the Indian Mutiny," Apollo, Vol. XCII, No. 102 (August 1970), pp. 138–143.
- "Queen Victoria and the Bible," British Workman, no. 60, 1 December 1859, p. 237.
- Stone, Roger T. "Barker, Thomas Jones (1813–1882)" in Oxford Dictionary of National Biography, Oxford University Press, 2004.
- Zetterström-Sharp, Johanna. "Gallery & Exhibition Reviews: Artist and Empire: Facing Britain's Imperial Past", Journal of Museum Ethnography, 29 November 2016, pp. 152–157.
