= Benjamin Barker =

Benjamin Barker may refer to:

- Benjamin Barker (painter) (1776–1838), English landscape painter
- Benjamin Fordyce Barker (1818–1891), American obstetrician
- Ben Barker (racing driver) (born 1991), British racing driver
- Ben Barker (speedway rider) (born 1988), British speedway rider
- Sweeney Todd, original name Benjamin Barker, fictional character
