= The Bride of Death =

The Bride of Death may refer to:

- Spinsters in Jeopardy, a 1953 detective novel by Ngaio Marsh, later published as The Bride of Death
- The Bride of Death (film), a 1915 Italian silent drama film, later released as The Shadow of Her Past
- The Bride of Death (painting), an 1839 oil painting by Thomas Jones Barker
