= London Street, Bath =

Painting by Walter Sickert

- Artist: Walter Sickert
- Year: c.1941
- Type: Oil on canvas, landscape painting
- Dimensions: 48.3 cm × 79 cm (19.0 in × 31 in)
- Location: Victoria Art Gallery, Bath

London Street, Bath is a 1941 oil painting by the British artist Walter Sickert depicting a cityscape in Bath in Somerset. Looking northeast from London Street towards where the London Road meets The Paragon, the view is shown from close to St Swithin's Church in Walcot. Margaret's Hill forks off to the left by Hedgemead Park. Sickert likely worked in his studio based on a photograph taken by his wife and fellow artist Thérèse Lessore. The canvas still shows the grid patterns, a technique he used during his later career. The couple lived at Bathampton on the outskirts of the city during the Second World War, where he died in 1942. The painting was displayed at a retrospective held by Leeds Art Gallery in 1942. The painting was acquired by the Victoria Art Gallery in Bath in 2005.

== Bibliography ==
- Baron, Wendy. Sickert: Paintings and Drawings. Yale University Press, 2006.
- Sturgis, Matthew. Walter Sickert: A Biography. HarperCollins, 2005.
