= John Joseph Barker =

18th-century British painter

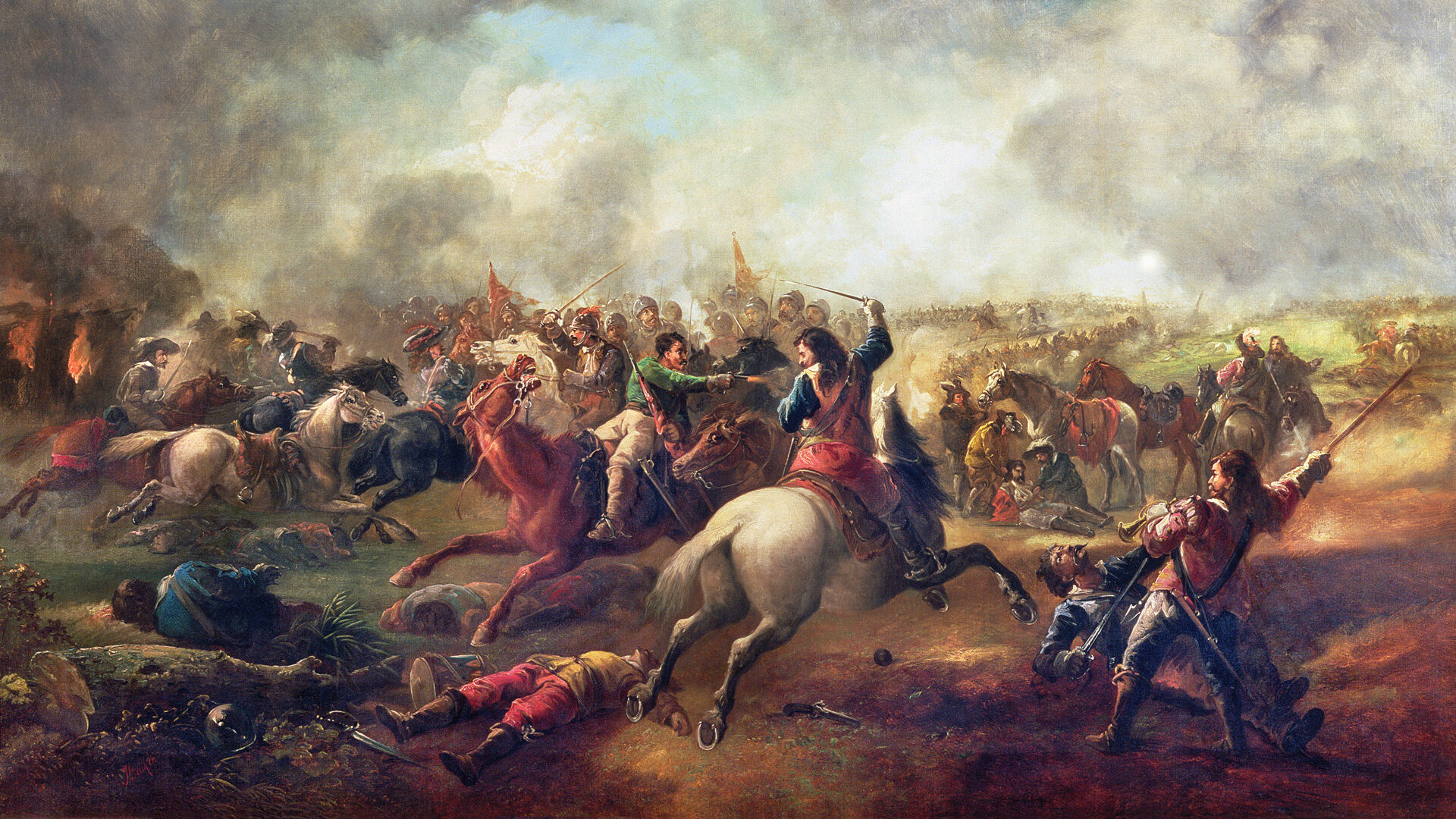
- The Battle of Marston Moor

John Joseph Barker (c. 1826-1904) was an 18th-century British painter, born in Somerset, England, son of painter Thomas Barker. He is most famous for his painting of the Battle of Marston Moor.
