= The Bride of Death (painting) =

Painting by Thomas Jones Barker

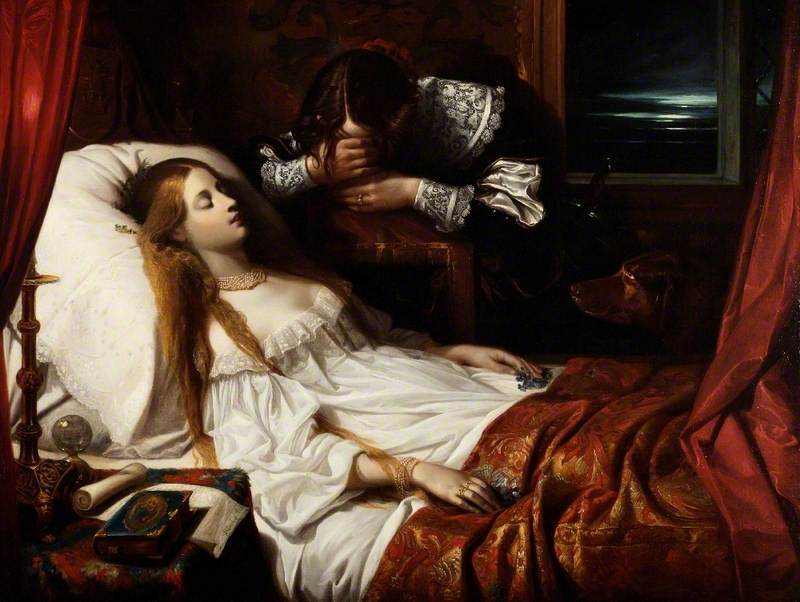
- Artist: Thomas Jones Barker
- Year: 1839
- Type: Oil on canvas, genre painting
- Dimensions: 124.5 cm × 167.1 cm (49.0 in × 65.8 in)
- Location: Victoria Art Gallery; Bath

The Bride of Death is an 1839 oil painting by the British artist Thomas Jones Barker. Based on a traditional French ballad about a young woman who dies on the eve of her wedding, it reflects the fashionable Romanticism of the period.

The artist had been a pupil of the leading French artist Horace Vernet. Aged around twenty six when he produced this work, Jones Barker went on to be a prominent figure during the Victorian era in his native Britain. The picture was a commission from Princess Marie of Orléans, the daughter of Louis Philippe I. The work was displayed at the Salon of 1841 held at the Louvre in Paris where it was awarded a medal. It was also exhibited at the British Institution in London the same year. The painting is now in the collection of the Victoria Art Gallery in Bath, which acquired it in 1923.

== Bibliography ==
- Lalumia, Matthew Paul. Realism and Politics in Victorian Art of the Crimean War. UMI Research Press, 1984.
- McCallum, Iain. Thomas Barker of Bath: The Artist and His Circle. Millstream Books, 2003.
