= Thomas Barker (painter) =

British landscape painter (1769–1847)

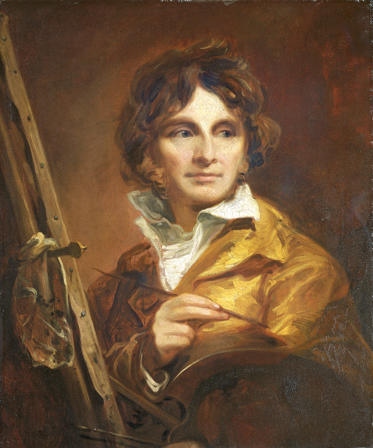
- Born: 1769; Trosnant (near Pontypool), Wales
- Died: 1847 (aged 77–78); Bath, England

Thomas Barker or Barker of Bath (1769 – 11 December 1847), was a Welsh painter of landscape and rural life.

== Early life ==
Barker was born in 1769, at Trosnant near the village of Pontypool, in Monmouthshire. His father, Benjamin Barker, was the son of a barrister, and practised as an artist, but never attempted more than the portraits of horses. He eventually took up employment as a Japanware decorator.

From an early age Barker showed a remarkable talent for drawing figures and designing landscapes, although he never took a lesson in either drawing or painting and was entirely self-taught. When he was sixteen his family moved to Bath where the patronage of an opulent coach-builder named Charles Spackman allowed him to follow his talent as an artist. During the first four years he employed himself in copying the works of the old Dutch and Flemish masters. At the age of twenty-one he was sent to Rome with ample funds to maintain his position there as a gentleman. While there he painted very little, contenting himself with society life.

== Life as an artist ==
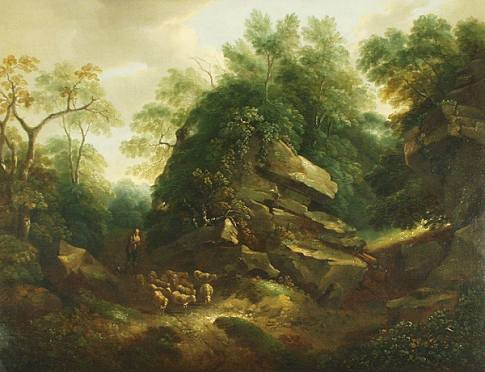
Hampton Rocks, Morning, now at the Victoria Art Gallery, Bath.

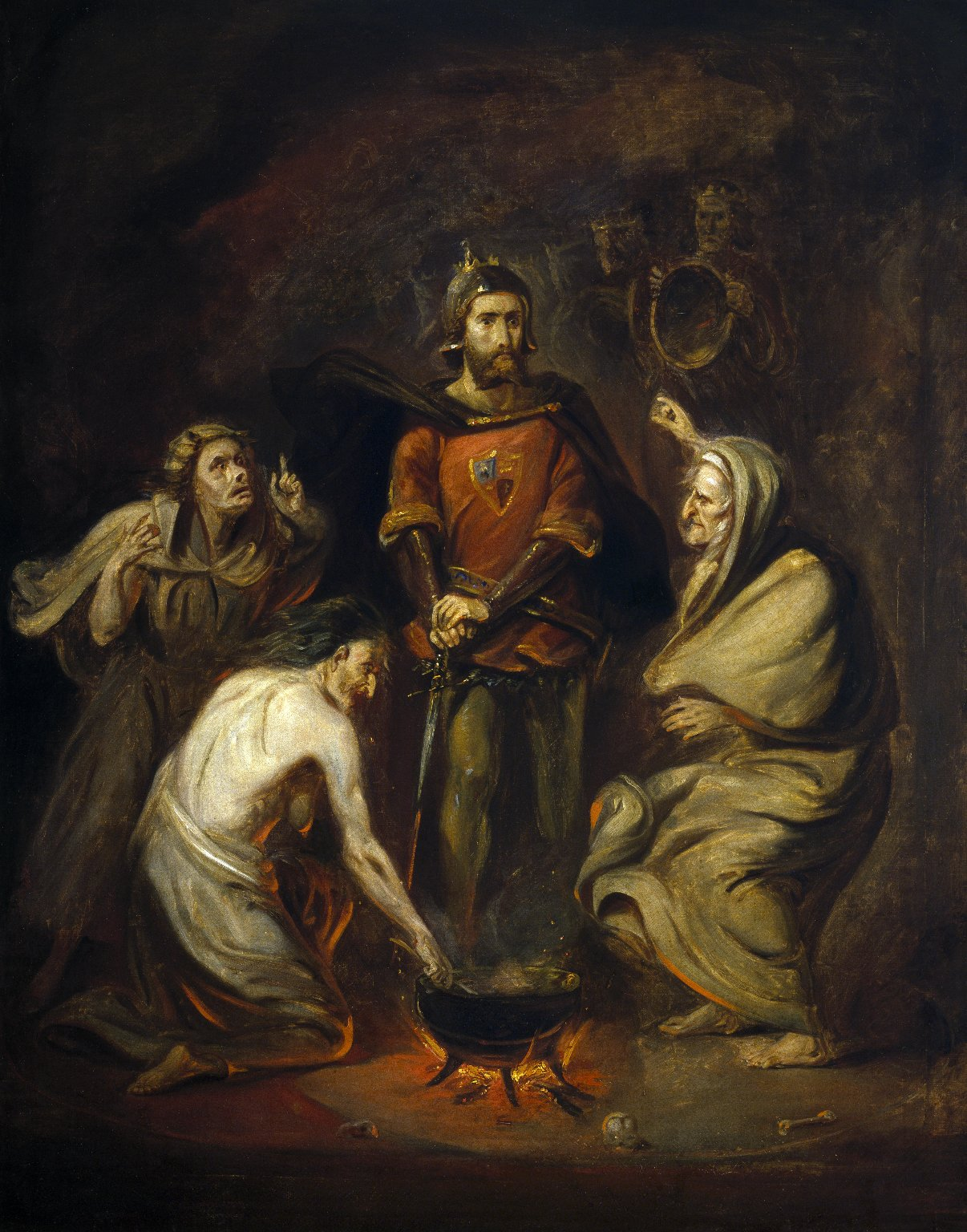
Macbeth and the Witches, now at the Folger Shakespeare Library, Washington, D.C.

Barker was an occasional exhibitor at the Royal Academy and the British Institution for almost fifty years, during which period he exhibited nearly one hundred pictures. He was a prolific artist, and painted a wide range of subjects. Few pictures of the English school are more generally known and appreciated than The Woodman, of which it appears two were painted, both of them from nature, and of life size: the first was sold to Mr. Macklin for 500 guineas; the second, for the same amount, became the property of Lord W. Paulett. In 1821 he painted the Trial of Queen Caroline, which included portraits of many celebrated men; but perhaps the best effort of Barker's pencil skill was the fresco, 30 feet in length, and 12 feet in height, representing The Inroad of the Turks upon Scio, in April, 1822, painted on the wall of his residence, Sion Hill, Bath.

When Barker's talents were in full vigour, no artist of his time had a greater hold on popular favour; his pictures of The Woodman, Old Tom (painted before he was seventeen years of age), and gipsy groups and rustic figures, were copied onto almost every possible material: Staffordshire pottery, Worcester china, Manchester cottons, and Glasgow linens. At one time he amassed considerable property by the sale of his works, and spent a large sum in building a mansion for his residence, enriching it with sculpture and other works of art. He died at Bath in 1847.

Barker was one of the first British artists, along with Benjamin West and Richard Westhall,to use Lithography as a print medium and contributed two prints Young Boy Seated, and Tilemakers to Specimens of Polyautography, the first British publication of a collection of Lithographic plates, originally published by Philipp André in 1803, and then reissued in an enlarged edition by Von Weiler in 1806-07. Barker's series of Rustic figures after nature published in Bath in 1813 in a small edition, is the first series of lithographs by a single British artist. Some of Barker's stones survive.

=== Works ===
There are six paintings by Barker in the Tate Gallery, including A Woodman and his Dog in a Storm (originally presented to the National Gallery in 1868) and several landscapes.

The British Museum holds a number of Barker's drawings and prints.

Three of Barker's paintings, Italian Landscape 1808, Landscape with a Waterfall and Landscape with Cattle are in Wolverhampton Art Gallery.

A painting of Wooded landscape with gipsies round a camp fire turned out to be probably the work of Barker painted over an earlier work by Michael Dahl, was featured on the BBC television series Fake or Fortune? in 2019. Barker's work on this subject was heavily inspired by Gainsborough's, and he painted several copies of The Gipsies, as well as many gypsy works of his own. He used the grouping from Gainsborough's The Gipsies as the background to one of his 1789 self-portraits.

In an episode of BBC's Britain's Lost Masterpieces broadcast in November 2019, a forest scene thought to be a copy of a famous painting by Gainsborough, was located at Birmingham Art Gallery. Following a full restoration by Simon Gillespie, the work was attributed to Barker.

In 1825, Thomas Barker painted a fresco depicting the Chios Massacre on the walls of Doric House, Bath, Somerset.

Two T. Barker of Bath landscape pictures appeared in the Walker's Galleries, 118 New Bond Street, Exhibition of Sketches & Water-colour Drawings by the Early English Water-Colour Artists and a few Foreign Artists, June 22 - September 30, 1920, both priced at fifteen guineas.

== Family ==
As well as Thomas Barker, the Barker family produced several artists of note. As well as his father's ability, Thomas' younger brother Benjamin Barker II (1776–1838) was also a talented artist known for his landscape work. Benjamin II exhibited at the Royal Academy and many of his works were engraved by Thales Fielding in aquatint. Barker's son, Thomas Jones Barker (1815–1882), followed his father and uncle into painting, studying at the studio of Horace Vernet in Paris. Many of Jones Barker's works were of a military nature, including Lord Clive's relief of Lucknow and The Allied generals before Sebastopol.

== Sources ==
- Bryan, Michael. "Barker, Thomas" in Bryan's Dictionary of Painters and Engravers, vol. I (A–K), London: George Bell & Sons, 1886.
- Dorment, Richard. "Thomas Barker of Bath," pages 9–12 in British Painting in the Philadelphia Museum of Art: From the Seventeenth through the Nineteenth Century, Philadelphia Museum of Art, 1986.
- Ellis, Andy (director); Roe, Sonia (editor); Dennis, Georgina (catalogue coordinator); et al. (2007). Oil paintings in public ownership in Staffordshire. London: The Public Catalogue Foundation. p. 238. ISBN 978-1-904931-34-8.
- "Fake Or Fortune? — The Lost Gainsborough". BBC. 22 July 2019.
- Johnson, Amy (25 July 2019). "Fake or Fortune: 'What a mess!' Fiona Bruce stunned by 'lost' Gainsborough painting twist". Daily Express.
- McCallum, Iain (2003). Thomas Barker of Bath: the artist and his circle. Millstream Books. ISBN 9780948975677.
