= Benjamin Barker (painter) =

English painter

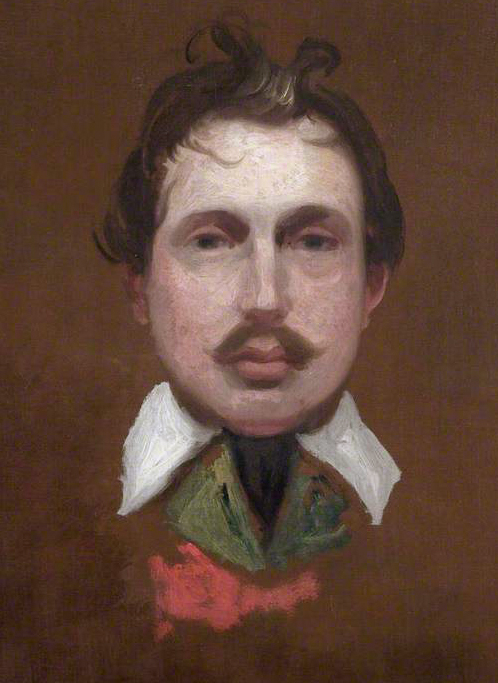
Self portrait

Benjamin Barker (1776–1838), was an English landscape painter.

Barker was the son of Benjamin and brother of Thomas Barker, called ‘Barker of Bath,’ resided at Bath, Somerset and between 1800 and 1821 exhibited occasionally at the Royal Academy. During the years 1813–20 he was a large exhibitor of views and landscape compositions at the Watercolour Society. He was also an exhibitor at the British Institution. There are three of his watercolour drawings in the South Kensington Museum. He was an artist of some skill and taste, but little power or originality. He died at Totnes after a lingering illness, 2 March 1838, aged 62. Thales Fielding engraved forty-eight of his landscapes in aquatint.
