= Victoria Art Gallery =

Art museum in Bath, Somerset, England

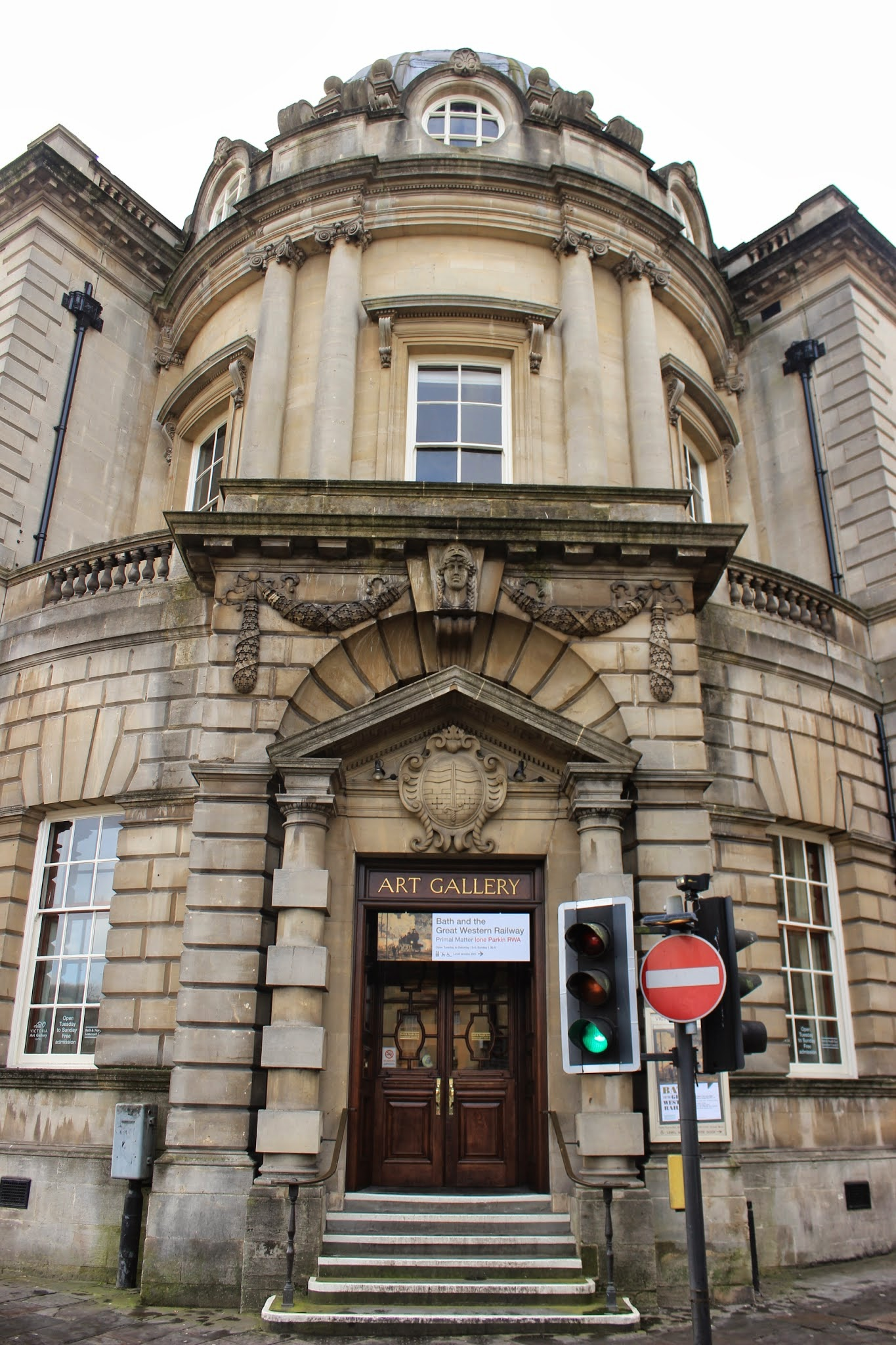

- Location within Somerset and the United Kingdom
- Established: 1900
- Location: Bath, Somerset
- Coordinates: 51.38265°N 2.35860°W
- Visitors: 92,000 per year
- Website: www.victoriagal.org.uk

The Victoria Art Gallery is a public art museum in Bath, Somerset, England. It was opened in 1900 to commemorate the Diamond Jubilee of Queen Victoria. It is a Grade II* listed building and houses over 1,500 objects of art including a collection of oil paintings from British artists dating from 1700 onwards. The ground floor was at one time a public library.

== The gallery ==
The building was designed in 1897 by John McKean Brydon, and has been designated as a Grade II* listed building. It originally was partly used as a public library but was converted in 1990 to house and display only art works. The building is constructed of limestone ashlar rendered in its upper half and occupies a corner site. It is a two storey building with an attic tower with a lead-covered dome. There are nine bays on Bridge Street and one on Grand Parade and each floor consists mainly of one large rectangular room. A flight of stone steps rises to the circular entrance hall which leads to the former library. The main stair is approached through an arch and is a seventeenth century revival stair made of mahogany with bulbous balusters. The ceiling is barrel-vaulted. The upper landing has Ionic marble columns and a coffered dome, embossed with signs of the Zodiac in relief. The Upper Gallery is lit by a range of skylights and has a coved ceiling, a copy in plaster of the Parthenon frieze, and a panelled dado with triglyphs.

The exterior of the building includes niches, the central niche being larger and flanked with Ionic columns and pilasters, holding a statue of Queen Victoria, by Andrea Carlo Lucchesi, and friezes of classical figures by George Anderson Lawson on either side. The council offices, the Guildhall, continue the building to the south-west.

The Gallery was named to celebrate Queen Victoria's sixty years on the throne. It is run by Bath and North East Somerset council and houses their collection of paintings, sculpture and decorative arts. There are two main galleries, the Upper Gallery and the Lower Gallery, linked by an imposing marble hallway and grand staircase.

== The collection ==
The collection includes over 1,500 decorative arts treasures including a display of British oil paintings from 17th century to the present day including works by Thomas Gainsborough, Thomas Jones Barker and Walter Sickert. Other items on display include sculptures, glassware and decorative artistic objects.

Cuts to funding from central government now mean that it has introduced charges for entrance to temporary exhibitions for the first time since the gallery was opened. Either of the two galleries are available for hire as venues for wedding ceremonies or drinks receptions.

== Selected exhibitions ==
Temporary exhibitions at the gallery have included:

- Grayson Perry: The Vanity of Small Differences (9 January – 10 April 2016)
- James Tower Ceramic Artist: A Centenary Celebration (21 September – 24 November 2019)
- Toulouse-Lautrec and the Masters of Montmartre (15 February – 26 May 2020)
- Freud, Minton, Ryan: Unholy Trinity (10 July – 19 September 2021)
- From Hogarth to Hodgkin: Our Best Prints (5 March – 4 May 2022)
- Peter Brown "Pete the Street" : Bath, Bristol and Beyond (22 October 2022 - 15 January 2023)

== Gallery ==
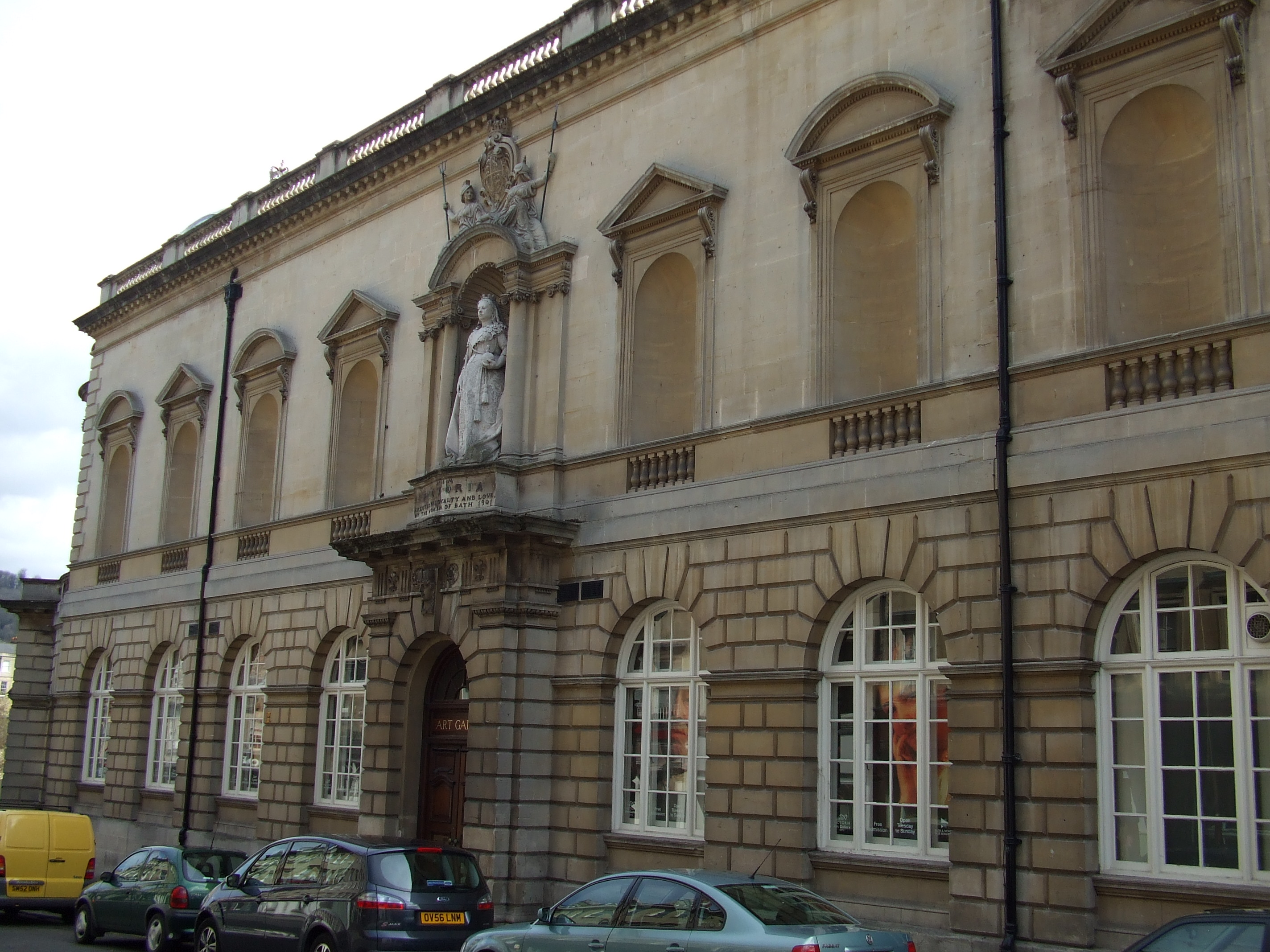
The side of the gallery showing the old entrance and statue of Queen Victoria

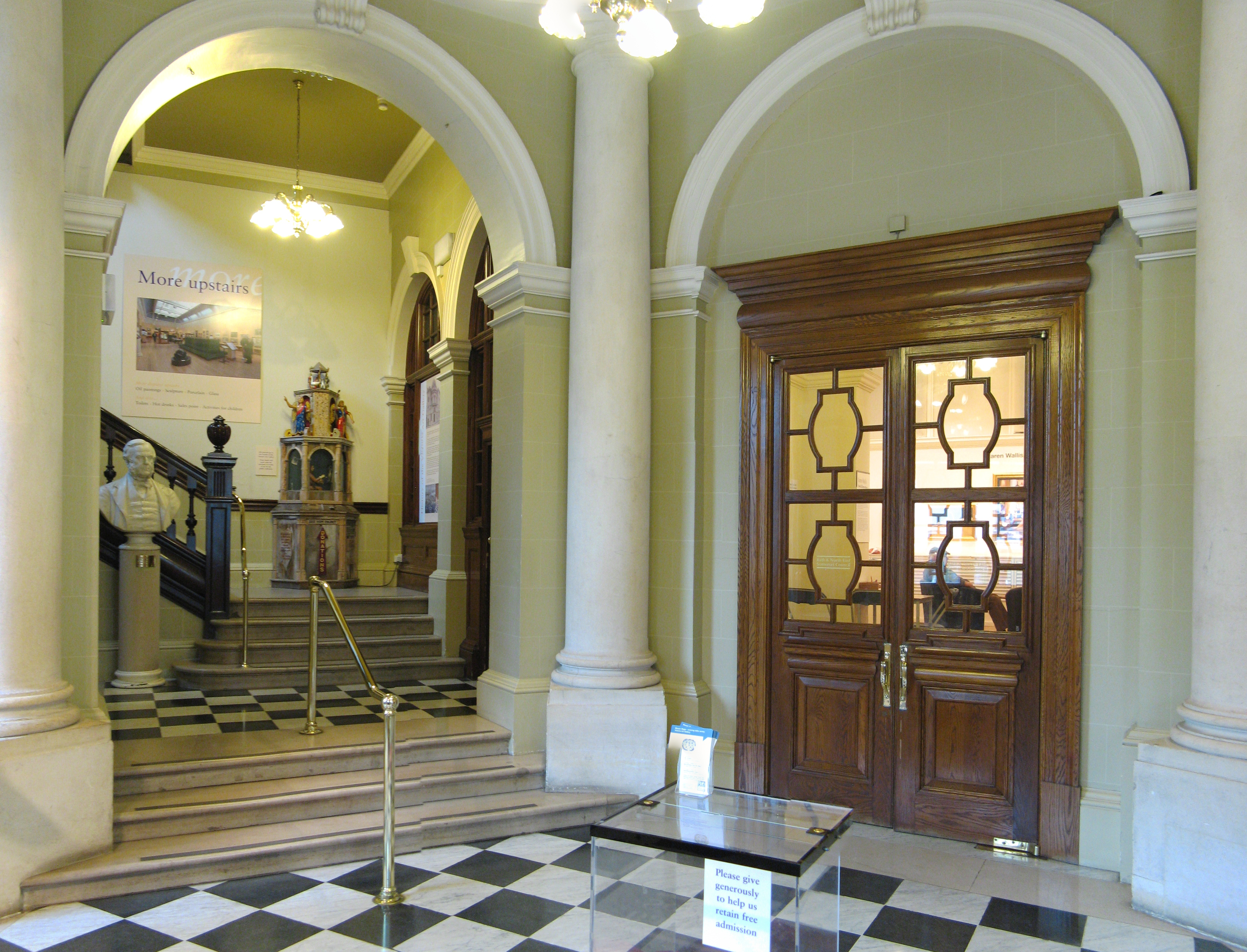
Foyer of the gallery

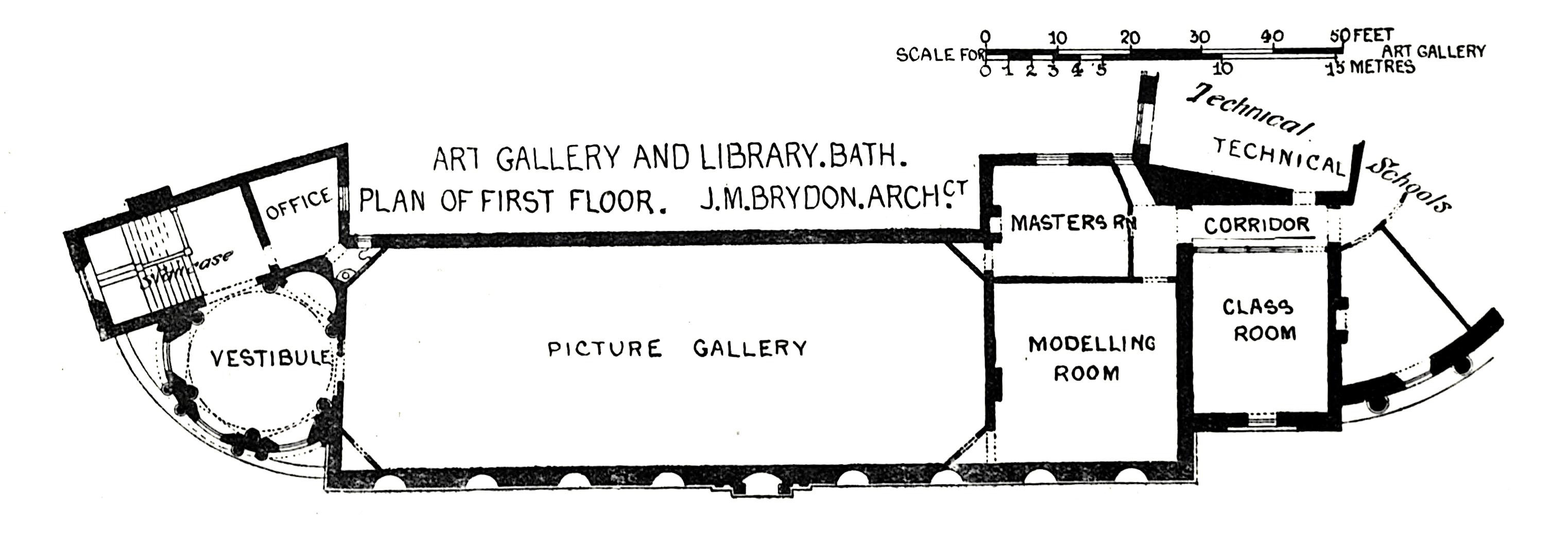
Plan of the Gallery

London Street, Bath by Walter Sickert, 1941
