= Muravyov =

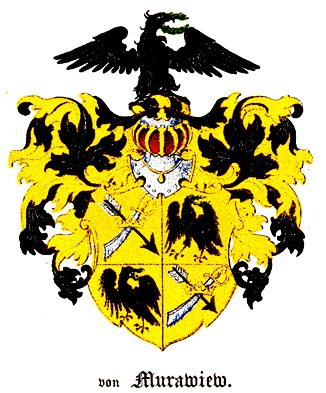
Coat of arms of the Muravyov family

The Muravyov family is an old Russian noble family, known since the 12th century. They share their ancestry with the Pushkin family, descending from two brothers, living in Novgorod in the 15th century. Members of the family held the title of Count in the Russian Empire, awarded to them on 26 August 1852 by Nicholas I of Russia and on 17 April 1865 by Alexander II of Russia for Count Nikolay Muravyov-Amursky.

Muravyov (Russian: Муравьёв, from муравей meaning "ant"), or Muravyova (feminine form; Муравьёва), also transliterated as Muraviev, Muravyev or Murav'ev, is also a Russian-language surname.

== Notable people ==
- Alexey Muravyov (1900–1941), Soviet army officer
- Dimitry Muravyev (born 1979), Kazakhstani road bicycle racer
- Irina Muravyova (born 1949), Soviet actress
- Konstantin Muraviev (1893–1965), Bulgarian politician
- Matvey Muravyev (1784–1836), Russian explorer
- Mikhail Muravyov (disambiguation) – several people
- Nadezhda Muravyeva (born 1980), Russian handball player
- Nikita Muravyov (1795–1843), a member of the Decembrist movement
- Nikolay Muravyov-Amursky (1809–1881), a Russian statesman and diplomat
- Nikolay Muraviev (1850–1908) Russian statesman
- Nikolay Muravyov-Karsky (1794–1866), Russian military leader and statesman
- Olena Muravyova (1867–1939), Ukrainian opera singer
- Vladimir Muravyov (athlete) (born 1959), former Soviet track and field athlete
- Vladimir Muravyov (translator) (1939–2001), Russian translator and literary critic
- Vyacheslav Muravyev (born 1982), Kazakhstani sprinter

== See also ==
- Muraviev Amurski-class cruiser, pair of light cruisers Russian empire ordered in 1912 from a Danzig shipyard, seized in 1914 for the German Kriegsmarine
- Muravyov-Apostol (disambiguation), several people
- 6538 Muraviov, an asteroid
- Mažeikiai, Lithuania, was formerly named Muravyov
