= Honours of war =

Privileges given to a surrendering army

The honours of war are a set of privileges that are granted to a defeated army during the surrender ceremony. The honours symbolise the valour of the defeated army, and grew into a custom during the age of early modern warfare. Typically a surrendering garrison was permitted to march out with drums beating and flags flying, after which they would become prisoners of war or granted free passage.

== Full honours of war ==
When full honours of war are granted, the defeated army may march out with its flags flying, drums beating, and bayonets fixed. During the matchlock era, musketmen would light their matches on both ends and place musketballs in their mouths. As the defeated army marches past, its band can play a tune of its own choice, customarily an enemy tune. However, there is no requirement that the defeated army select an enemy tune, and the British army at the Battles of Saratoga (1777) marched out to the tune of "The British Grenadiers".

After the march-past, the defeated army will stack its arms and turn over any government property to the victor. However, officers may keep their sidearms and personal baggage. The defeated army may also take a couple of cannons with them, along with a symbolic supply of ammunition.

== Denial of honours ==
The American defenders had been refused the honours of war when they surrendered after the Siege of Charleston (1780). When negotiating the surrender of a British army at Yorktown a year later, American General George Washington insisted: "The same Honors will be granted to the Surrendering Army as were granted to the Garrison of Charles Town." As a result, the British had to march with flags furled and muskets shouldered, and the surrender articles insisted that the band play "a British or German march."

The honours of war are considered to be a symbolic recognition of a valiant defence. Therefore, a victorious general may also refuse to grant the honours of war if he feels that the enemy has given up too easily. For example, after British Colonel James Mercer was killed by a cannonball at the Battle of Fort Oswego, his replacement John Littlehales quickly decided to surrender. French General Louis-Joseph de Montcalm refused to grant honours of war to the British because he felt that Littlehales had not put up enough of a fight.

== History ==
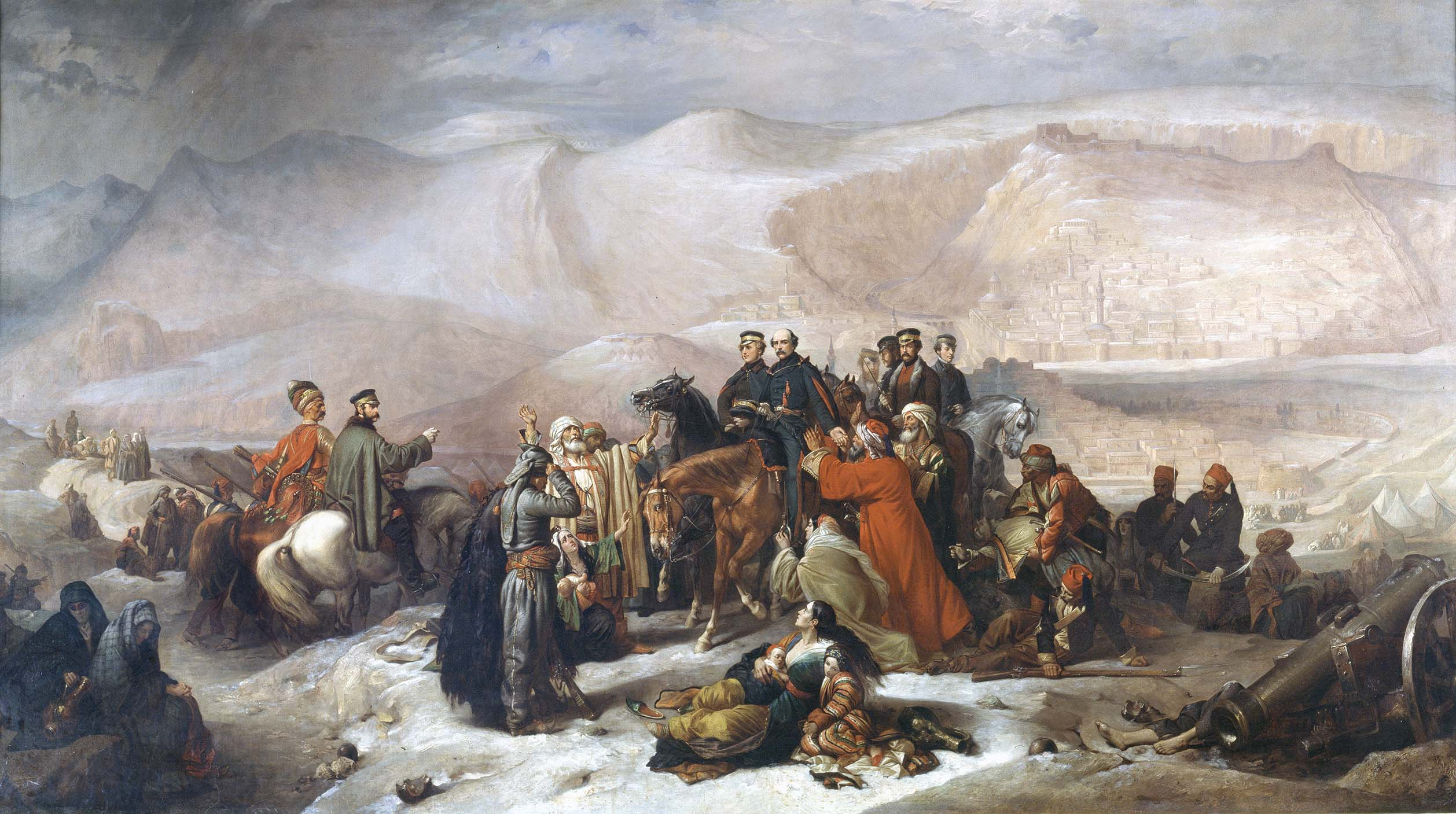
The Capitulation of Kars by Thomas Jones Barker. The 1855 Siege of Kars during the Crimean War ended with the garrisons being granted the honours of war.

The honours of war became traditional in the age of early modern warfare, when sieges were more common, and logistical challenges made it difficult to corner a defeated enemy after a battlefield victory. However, the practice continued into the age of industrial warfare. After the Siege of Metz (1870), the Prussians offered honours of war to the capitulating French army, but the French general Bazaine refused to accept them. In World War II, the Germans granted the honours of war to the defeated French garrison at the Siege of Lille (1940), and the British granted the honours of war to the defeated Italian army at the Battle of Amba Alagi (1941) and the Second Battle of El Alamein in 1942.

The honours of war remain part of the laws of war, although terms such as the retention of cannons have become obsolete. The 2015 Law of War Manual from the United States Department of Defense specifies that:

Capitulations agreed upon between belligerents must take into account the rules of military honor. Conditions involving unnecessary disgrace or ignominy should not be insisted upon. Capitulations may include the right of the capitulating forces to surrender with colors displayed or other indications of professional respect for the capitulating forces. For example, it may be appropriate to allow surrendering officers to keep their side arms.
