= Christopher Teesdale =

British Army general (1833–1893)

Major-General Sir Christopher Teesdale VC KCMG CB
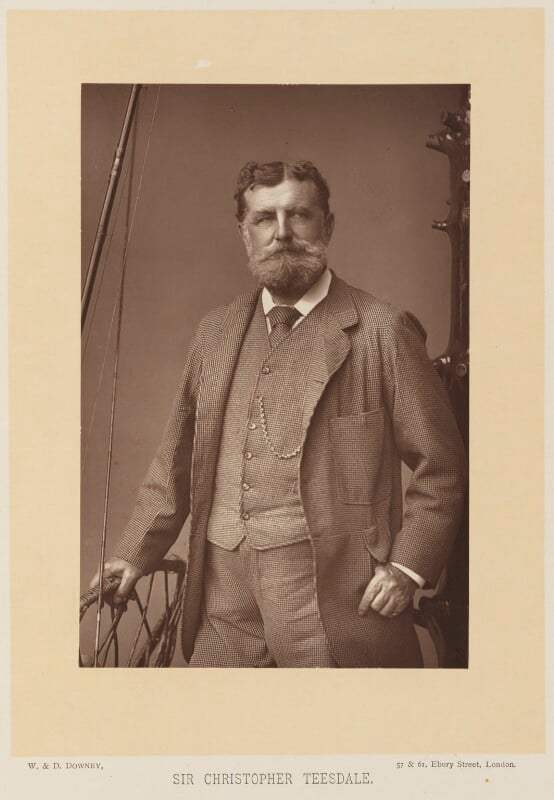
- Teesdale in c. 1891
- Born: 1 June 1833; Grahamstown, Cape Colony (now Eastern Cape, South Africa
- Died: 1 December 1893 (aged 60); South Bersted, England
- Burial place: St Mary Magdalene Churchyard, South Bersted
- Military career
- Allegiance: United Kingdom
- Branch: British Army
- Service years: 29 May 1848 – 22 April 1892
- Rank: Major-General
- Units: Royal Artillery
- Conflicts: Crimean War; Second Anglo-Chinese War; Mahdist War; 1882 Anglo-Egyptian War
- Awards: Victoria Cross; Knight Commander of the Order of St Michael and St George; Companion of the Order of the Bath; Légion d'honneur (France); Order of the Medjidie, First Class (Ottoman Empire)

Major-General Sir Christopher Charles Teesdale VC KCMG CB (1 June 1833 – 1 December 1893) was a British Army officer and the first South African-born recipient of the Victoria Cross, the highest and most prestigious award for gallantry in the face of the enemy that can be awarded to British and Commonwealth forces.

== Early life ==
Christopher Charles Teesdale was born in Grahamstown, Cape of Good Hope, to Lieutenant-General Henry George Teesdale of the Royal Artillery who was stationed there. He joined the Royal Artillery as a gentleman cadet on 29 April 1848. His first posting was to Corfu and he was promoted to second lieutenant on 22 March 1853 and left Corfu in April 1853.

== Crimea ==
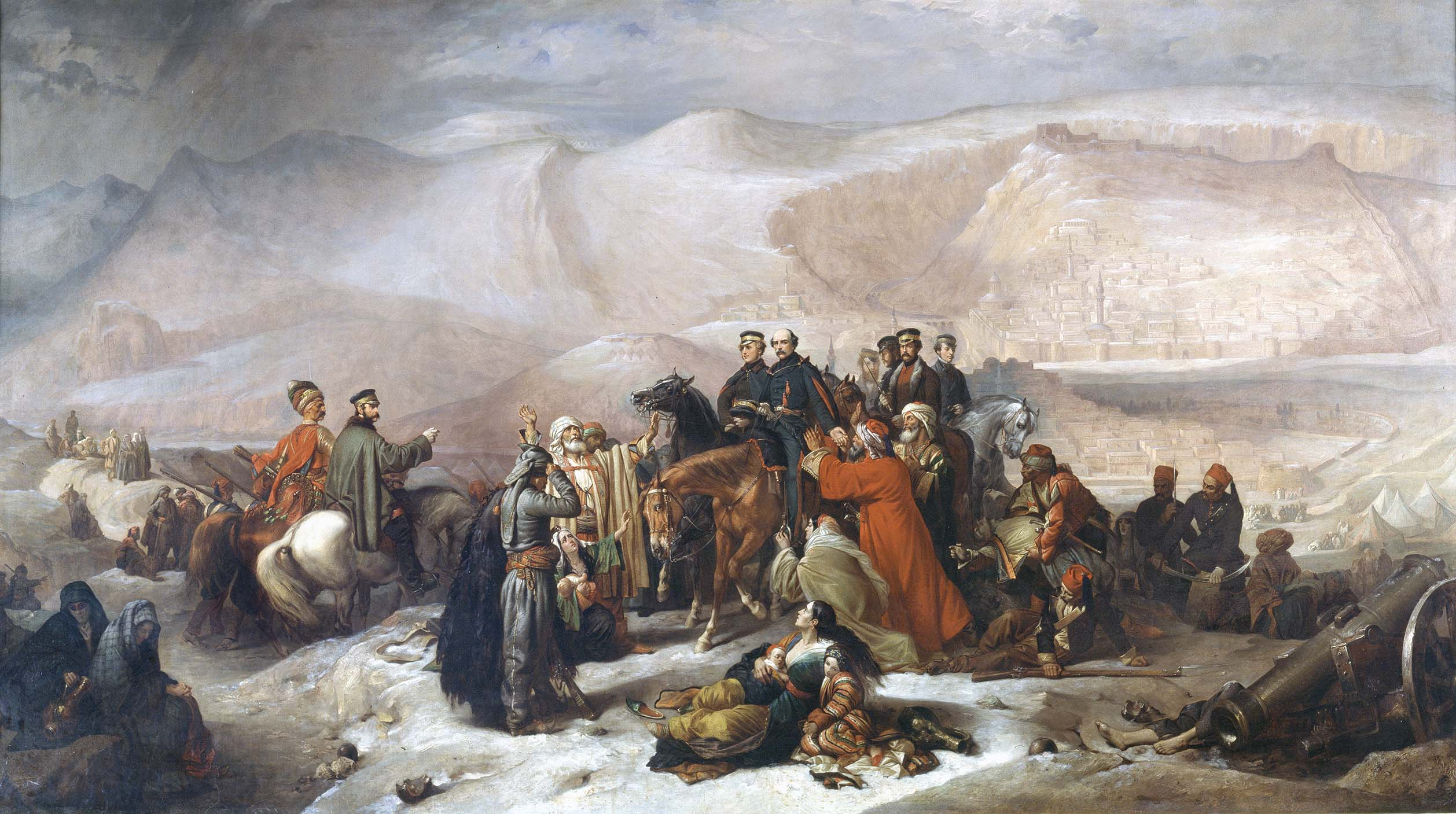
The Capitulation of Kars by Thomas Jones Barker, 1860

Teesdale was 22 years old, and a lieutenant in the Royal Regiment of Artillery, British Army during the Crimean War when the following deed took place for which he was awarded the VC.

On 29 September 1855 at Kars, Turkey, Lieutenant Teesdale volunteered to take command of the force engaged in the defence of the most advanced part of the works. He threw himself into the midst of the enemy and encouraged the garrison to make an attack so vigorous that the Russians were driven out. During the hottest part of the action he induced the Turkish artillerymen to return to their post from which they had been driven by enemy fire and after the final victorious charge he saved from the fury of the Turks a considerable number of the enemy wounded – an action gratefully acknowledged by the Russian Staff.

Teesdale was wounded at the siege of Kars, taken prisoner and held in Russia until he was released in 1856. He was awarded the Légion d'honneur and made an Honorary CB in the same year. A talented water colourist, he was responsible for illustrations in book on Battle of Kars by Humphry Sandwith, MD, the regiment's doctor at Kars. The illustrations were possibly done whilst Teesdale was in captivity.

He was decorated with the VC by Queen Victoria in the quadrangle of Windsor Castle on 21 November 1857 along with James Craig, George Symons and Joseph Malone.

== Later life ==
He was appointed as Master of The Ceremonies and Extra Equerry to The Prince of Wales on 9 November 1858, positions he held until his death and was also made aide-de-camp to Queen Victoria on 1 October 1877. Promoted to major-general in March 1887, he was made Knight Commander of St Michael and St George (KCMG) in the Queen's Jubilee honours on 8 July 1887. He retired on 22 March 1892 and was buried in his family tomb in South Bersted, Sussex. His VC is part of the Lord Ashcroft VC Collection at the Imperial War Museum.

Court offices
Preceded by Sir Francis Seymour	Master of the Ceremonies; 1890–1893	Succeeded by Sir William Colville
