= Mehmet Vasıf Pasha Gürcü =

Mehmet Vasıf
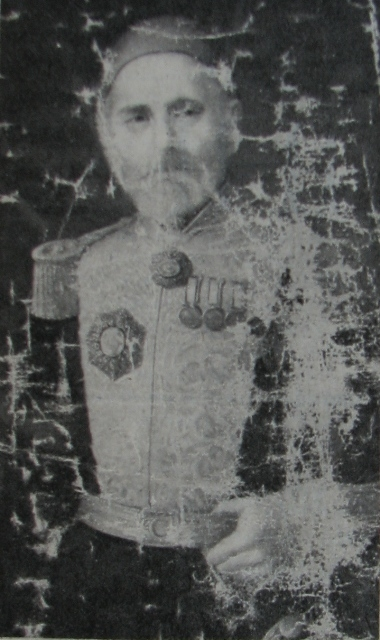
- Born: Mehmet Vasıf
- Died: 1865
- Military career
- Allegiance: Ottoman Empire
- Branch: Ottoman Army
- Rank: Field marshal
- Conflicts: Crimean War; Siege of Kars

Mehmet Vasıf Pasha Gürcü (died 1865) was an Ottoman field marshal and administrator of ethnic Georgian background.

== Biography ==
According to the memoirs of the Russian general Nikolay Muravyov, Vasıf was a Georgian from the Guria province, born in the village Chokhlati and originally surnamed Gudjabidze. He was sold as a slave at the age of 12 to Reşid Mehmed Pasha in Istanbul. The 19th-century Ottoman chronicler Mehmed Süreyya also records his Georgian origins.

Rising through the ranks, Mehmet Vasıf became a lieutenant general in 1830 or 1831. He then served, from the 1830s through the 1850s, as governor (wali) of Niş, Salonica, Vidin, Arabistan, and Trabzon. From the 1830s to the 1850s, Mehmet Vasıf Pasha was as a (governor) of Serbia, commander of the army in Arabistan and commander-in-chief in Anatolia. In 1855, he, as a commander-in-chief in Anatolia, was aided by the British officer William Williams, who effectively led the Turkish defense of Kars against the Russian forces in the Crimean War.
