= The Vüze =

Residential apartment building in the south end of Halifax, Nova Scotia

Coordinates: 44°38′16.64″N 63°34′32.72″W

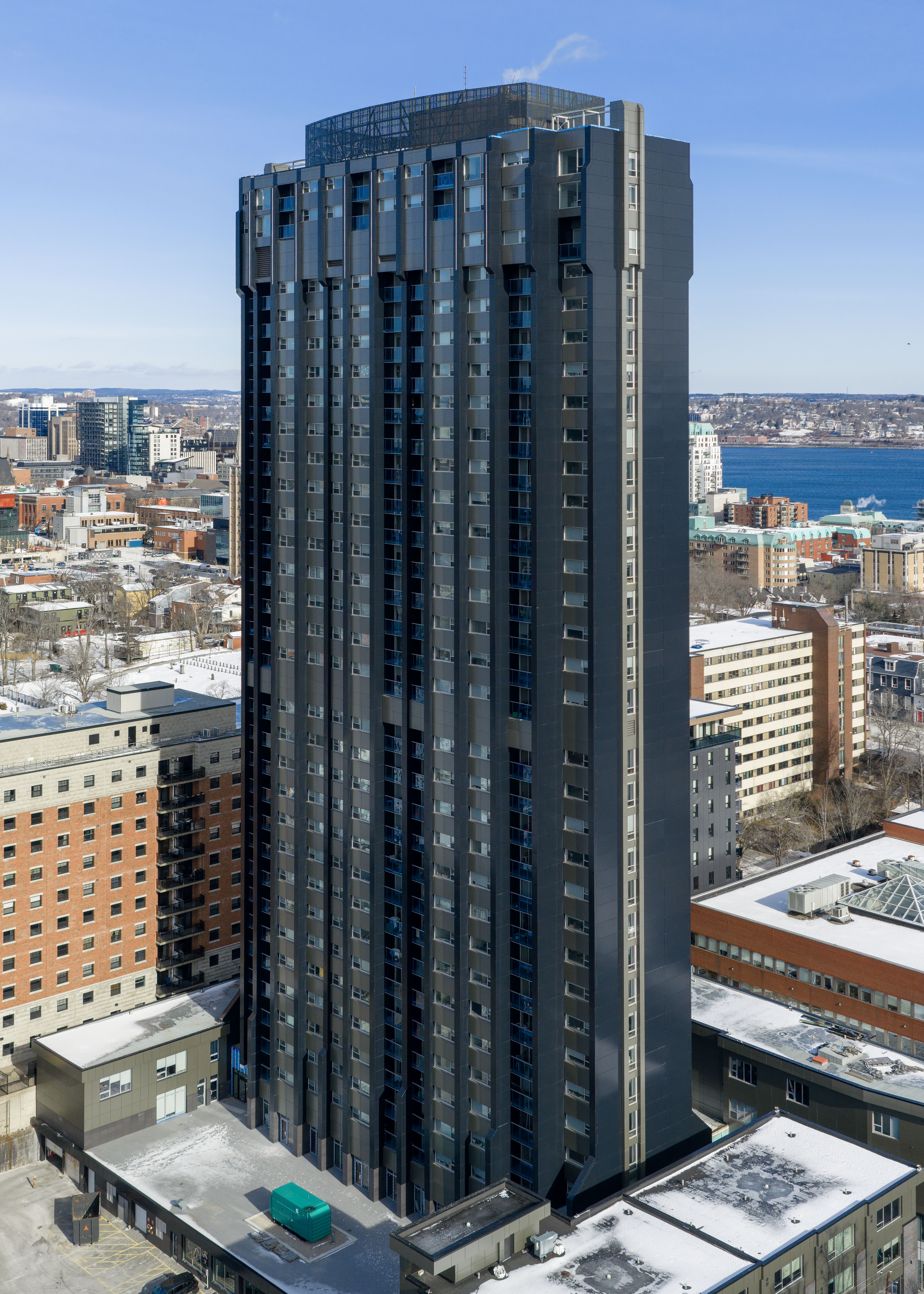
- The Vüze viewed from the south in 2026
- Interactive map of the The Vüze area

General information
- Type: Apartment building
- Architectural style: Brutalist / Modernist
- Location: (Canada) Halifax, Nova Scotia
- Completed: 1971

Height
- Height: 106 m (347.8 ft)

Technical details
- Floor count: 33 floors

The Vüze, formerly known as Fenwick Place and Fenwick Tower, is a residential apartment building in the south end of Halifax, Nova Scotia, Canada. At 106 metres and 33 storeys in height, it was the tallest building in Atlantic Canada from its construction in 1971 until 2023.

== History ==
=== Construction ===
The building was completed in 1971 and was officially named Fenwick Place, though most Halifax-area residents referred to it as Fenwick Tower. It occupies a property between Fenwick Street and South Street; it takes its name from Fenwick Street, which in turn honours Sir William Fenwick Williams, former Lieutenant Governor of Nova Scotia.

At the time the building was being built, the developer boldly touted it as the largest residential project east of Toronto. Once financial problems set in, the goal seemed unreachable and Fenwick Place was sold off to Dalhousie University for $5.25 million CAD as a student residence. Initial plans for the building featured the inclusion of a swimming pool on the top two floors. However, after taking over the project, Dalhousie decided that the cost of installing repeater pumps throughout the building to pump the water to the top would be prohibitively expensive, and scrapped the idea of the pool before construction reached that phase. During construction, Hurricane Beth filled the elevator shafts with seventeen feet of water. In 1971, when the first residents began to move in, complaints were made of apartments missing heat, windows, and other furnishings or amenities.

=== Hurricane Juan ===
Collapsed wall in 15th floor apartment following the hurricane

On the night of September 28, 2003, Hurricane Juan hit Halifax, forcing all residents to the building's basement overnight. Windows in several apartments shattered and the contents of some of these apartments were blown out onto the ground below. Residents were evacuated from approximately one week up to 8 weeks, depending on the damage and repair time to their individual apartments. Unlike most private landlords and other universities in the area, Dalhousie paid for all displaced students and families to be housed in hotels until the green light was given to return.

=== Sale ===
In 2008, the university hired a firm to move towards the sale of the building. Spokespeople downplayed the possibility that the building might be demolished, citing the rarity of a building this tall in Halifax coupled with the difficulty in building a new one. They also suggested a refurbishment would be much more likely, and that a sale would take some time to go through, given the size and complexity of the project.

In 2009 Templeton Properties purchased Fenwick Place from Dalhousie University and has begun the refurbishment of the apartments. After purchasing Fenwick Place in 2009, Templeton Properties officially changed the name to Fenwick Tower to reflect the name that was commonly used. The name was later changed to The Vüze, and a purple sign displaying the new name was added to the side of the building.

== Description ==
=== Elevators ===
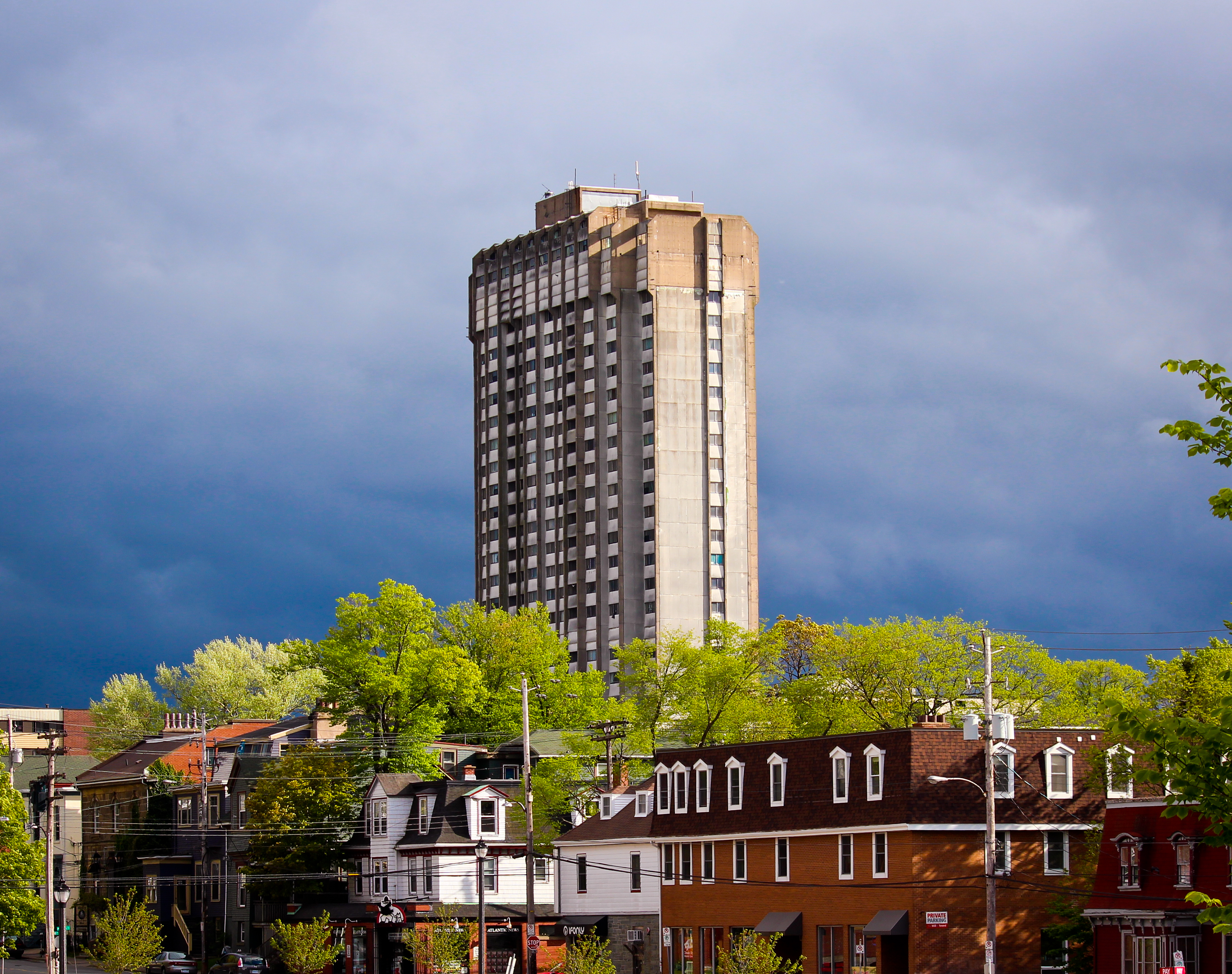
Fenwick Tower in 2011

There are four elevators in the building. One is an express elevator, permitting access to only the basement, lobby, and uppermost floors. Another features doors on either end of the cabin, and is often used as a service elevator. The two remaining lifts are local elevators servicing all floors.

=== Floors ===
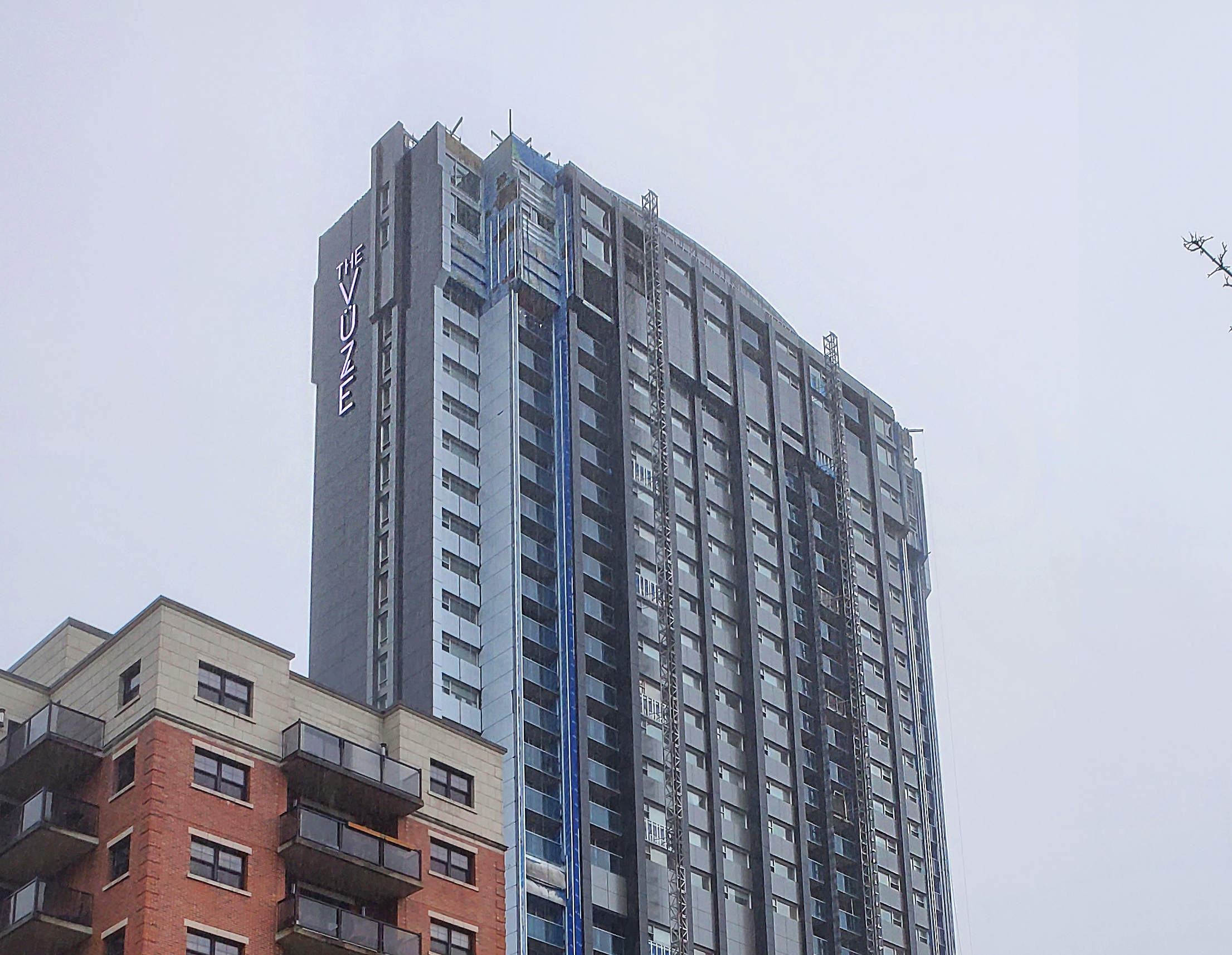
The Vüze in 2021

The Vüze consists of 33 storeys, also containing an east-facing webcam run by the Chebucto Community Net. During the Dalhousie period of ownership, the 32nd and 33rd floors were used for international exchange students, as well as hearing and speech clinics associated with the School of Human Communication Disorders, which also occupied the "PR" floor (the first underground floor). The 31st storey, which lacks direct elevator access, contains mechanical rooms. The 30th floor contains storage areas that jut down to the floor below in some places. Under the management of Tempelton Properties two additional floors were added, raising the height to a total of 120 metres.

There is an unmarked floor between the 15th and 16th floors that contains boilers and other maintenance equipment. There is no direct elevator access to this floor. Like many buildings, there is no official or marked 13th floor. Hence, the only floors whose marked number does not match the actual storey of the building are the 14th and 15th floors. They are actually the 13th and 14th storeys, respectively.

The main floor consists of the reception area, offices, the main foyer, and the entrance to Fenwick Street. Following the conversion of the property to rental apartments, an on-site fitness centre was added to the floor. The basement contains the aforementioned "PR" level, as well as three parking levels; "P1" (nearest to ground), "P2", and "P3".

== See also ==
- List of tallest buildings in Atlantic Canada
- List of tallest buildings in Halifax, Nova Scotia
- List of brutalist structures
