= Fenwick Williams =

Nova Scotian British Army officer (1800–1883)

General Sir Fenwick Williams GCB Bt
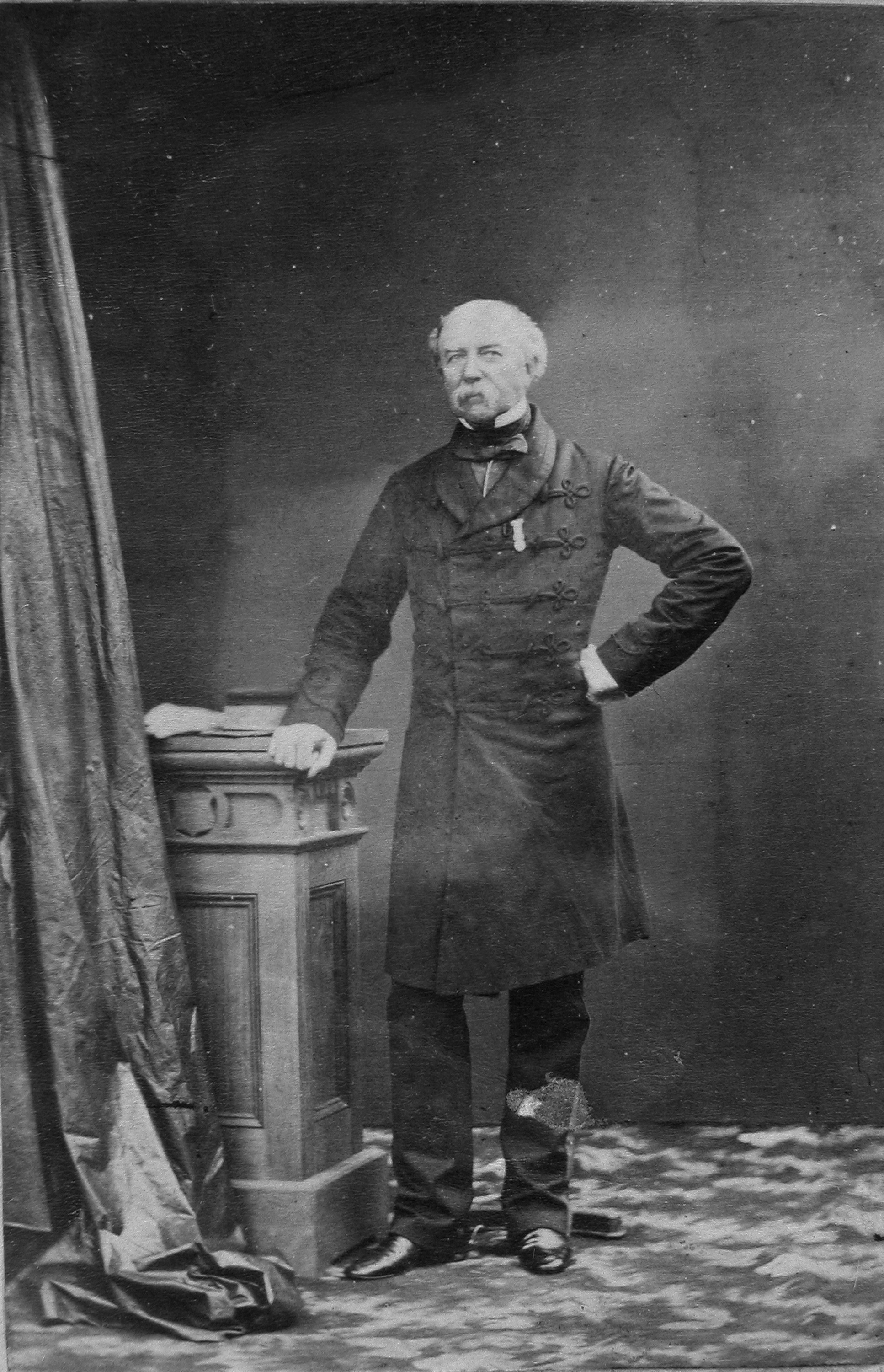
- Lt. Gen. Sir William Fenwick Williams taken at William Notman's studio in Montreal in 1861.
- Born: 4 December 1800; Annapolis Royal, Nova Scotia
- Died: 26 July 1883 (aged 82); London, England
- Military career
- Allegiance: United Kingdom
- Branch: British Army
- Service years: 1825–1883
- Rank: General
- Commands: Commander-in-Chief, North America
- Conflicts: Crimean War
- Awards: Knight Grand Cross of the Order of the Bath

1st Lieutenant Governor of Nova Scotia
- In office 8 November 1865 – 18 October 1867
- Monarch: Victoria
- Governor General: The Viscount Monck
- Premier: Charles Tupper; Hiram Blanchard
- Preceded by: Charles Hastings Doyle
- Succeeded by: Charles Hastings Doyle

General Sir William Fenwick Williams, 1st Baronet (4 December 1800 – 26 July 1883) was a Nova Scotian-born British Army officer.

Williams is remembered for his defence of the town of Kars during the Crimean War. He with other British officers inspired the poorly equipped Turkish soldiers to repel Russian attacks by General Murav’ev on the besieged town for three months, causing 6,000 Russian casualties. They were forced to surrender due to starvation, disease and shortage of ammunition. However, they surrendered on their own terms, with the officers being allowed to retain their swords. Williams was imprisoned at Ryazan, but he was treated very well and released at the end of the Crimean War in 1856. Before returning home he was introduced to Tsar Alexander II.

Many other honours were bestowed upon Williams, and in 1865–1867, he was appointed the first Lieutenant Governor of Nova Scotia, where he was born.

== Life ==
=== Birth, education and early career ===
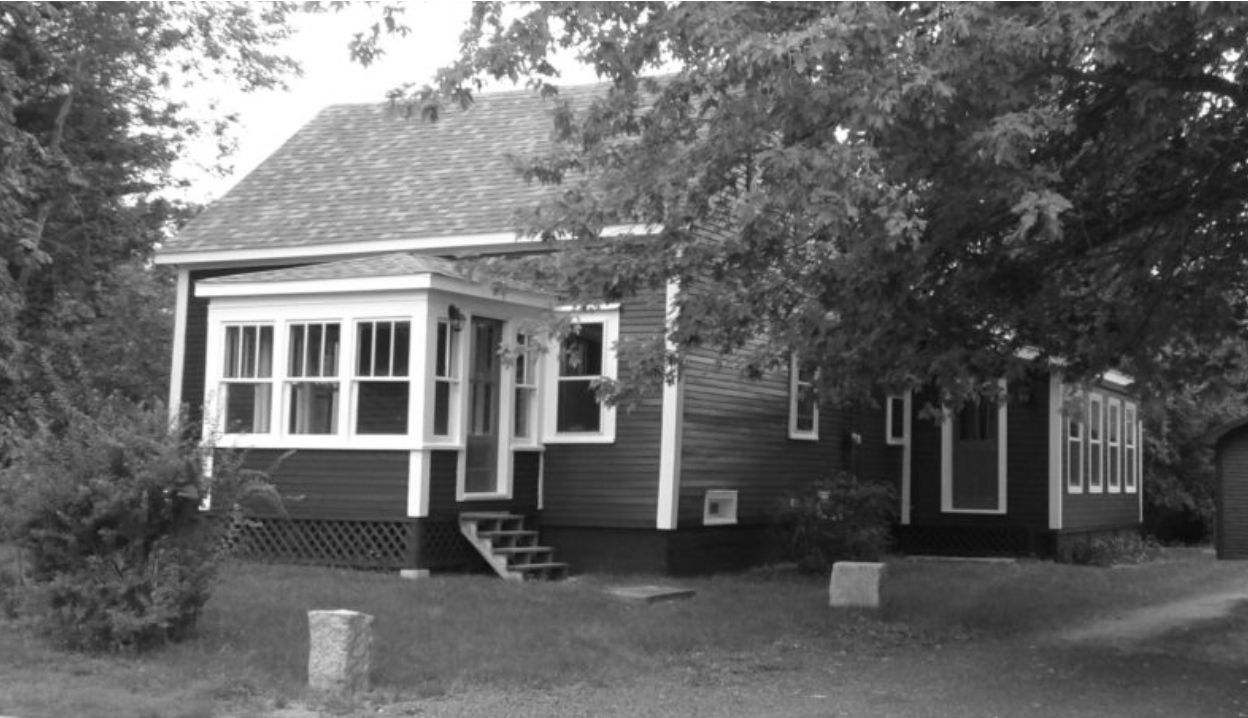
Williams' re-located childhood home in Annapolis Royal, Nova Scotia.

He was born in Annapolis Royal, Nova Scotia, the second son of Commissary-General Thomas Williams, barrack-master at Halifax, Nova Scotia, Canada - a plaque now marks the site. He was, however, widely rumoured to be the illegitimate son of Prince Edward, Duke of Kent and Strathearn; this would make him Queen Victoria's half-brother. Williams never denied this, but it is not thought to be true.

Williams was educated at the Royal Military Academy in Woolwich. He entered the Royal Artillery as second lieutenant in 1825.

=== Ottoman Empire ===
His services were lent to Turkey in 1841, and he was employed as a captain in the arsenal at Constantinople. He was British commissioner in the conferences preceding the treaty of Erzurum in 1847, and again in the settlement of the Ottoman-Iranian boundary in 1848. He was appointed CB in 1852.

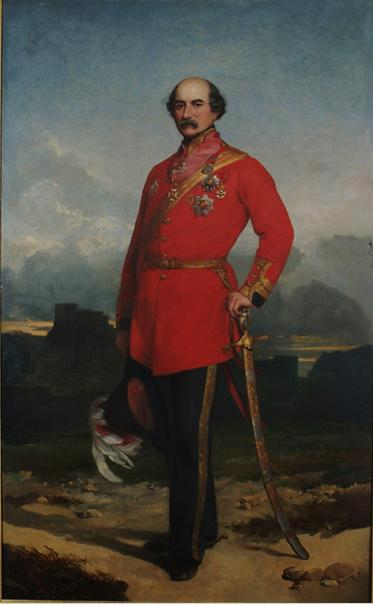
William Fenwick Williams with sword given by Nova Scotia House of Assembly by William Gush, painted for the Parliament House, Halifax, Nova Scotia and still hanging in Province House The sword shown is displayed at University of King's College Library, Halifax.

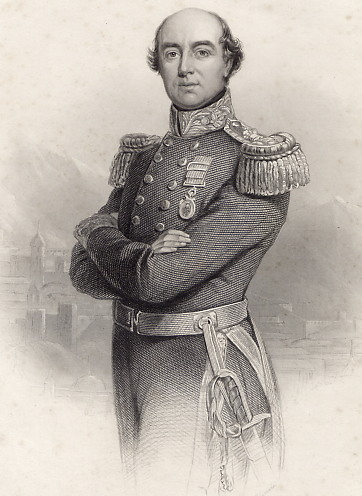
Sir William Fenwick Williams, 1st Baronet, 1853

Promoted colonel, he was British commissioner with the Turkish army in Anatolia in the Crimean War (Russian War) of 1854–56, and, having been made a pasha (general/governor/lord) with the degree of ferik (major-general), he commanded the Turkish troops at the defence of the town of Kars during the Crimean War. He with other British officers inspired the poorly equipped Turkish soldiers to repel Russian attacks by General Muravyov on the besieged town for three months causing 6,000 Russian casualties. They were forced to surrender due to starvation, disease and shortage of ammunition. However, they surrendered on their own terms, with the officers being allowed to retain their swords. Williams was imprisoned at Ryazan but he was treated very well and released at the end of the Crimean War in 1856. Before returning home he was introduced to Tsar Alexander II.

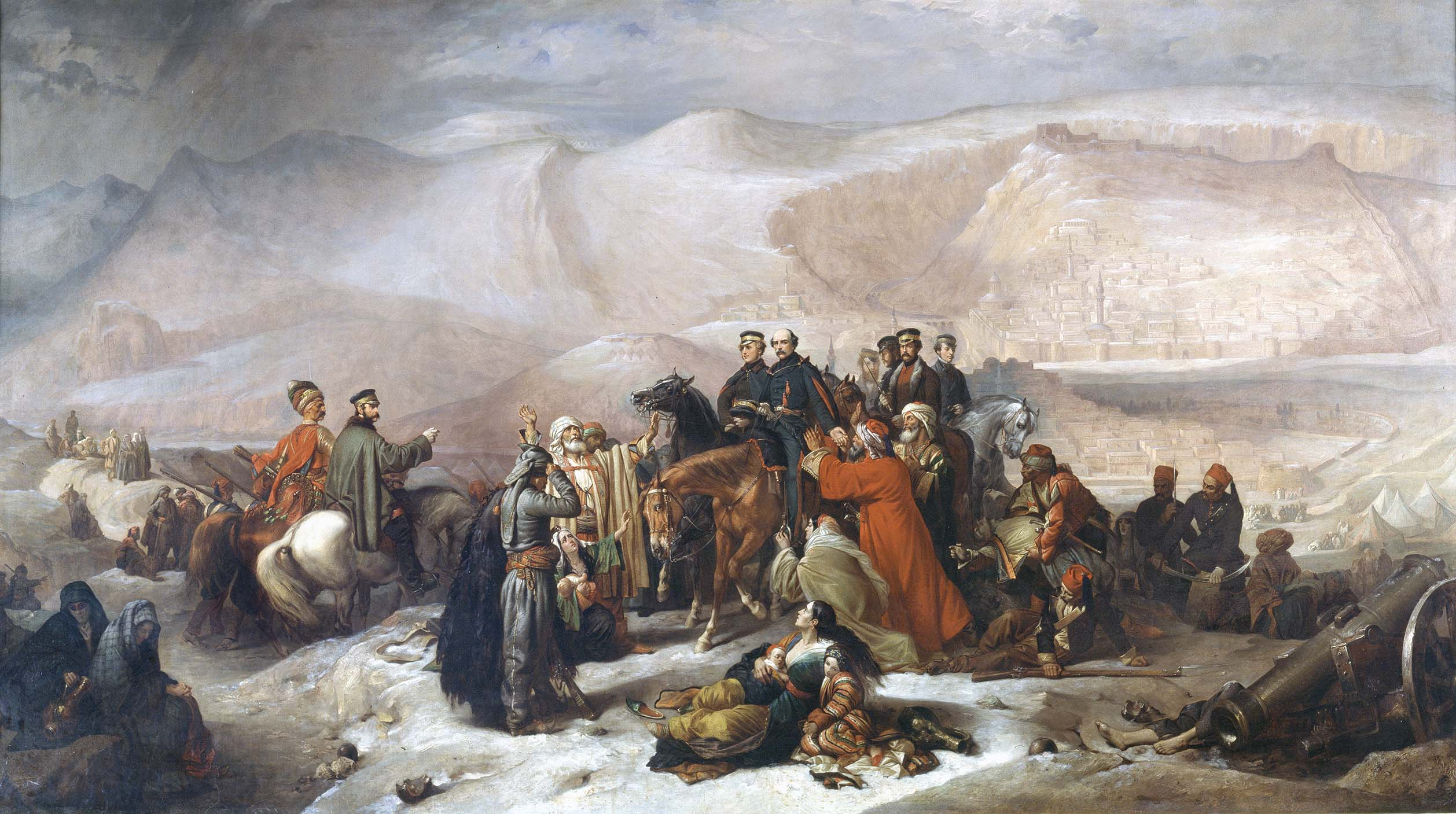
The Capitulation of Kars by Thomas Jones Barker, 1860

Williams had put up such an honourable defence of the city that Muravyov stated: "General Williams, you have made yourself a name in history, and posterity will stand amazed at the endurance, courage and the discipline which the siege has called forth in the remains of the army."

Annuity to Sir W. F. Williams Act 1856
- Act of Parliament
- Parliament of the United Kingdom
- Long title: An Act to settle an Annuity on Sir William Fenwick Williams, in consideration of his eminent Services.
- Citation: 19 & 20 Vict. c. 30
- Territorial extent: United Kingdom

Dates
- Royal assent: 23 June 1856
- Commencement: 23 June 1856 (Note: The Acts of Parliament (Commencement) Act 1793.)
- Repealed: 22 September 1893
Other legislation
Repealed by	Statute Law Revision (No. 2) Act 1893

Status: Repealed

Text of statute as originally enacted

A baronetcy with pension for life, the KCB, the grand cross of the Legion of Honour and of the Order of the Medjidie, the freedom of the City of London with a sword of honour, and the honorary degree of DCL of Oxford University, were the distinctions conferred upon him, along with promotion to major-general in November 1855 after his return from captivity in Russia.

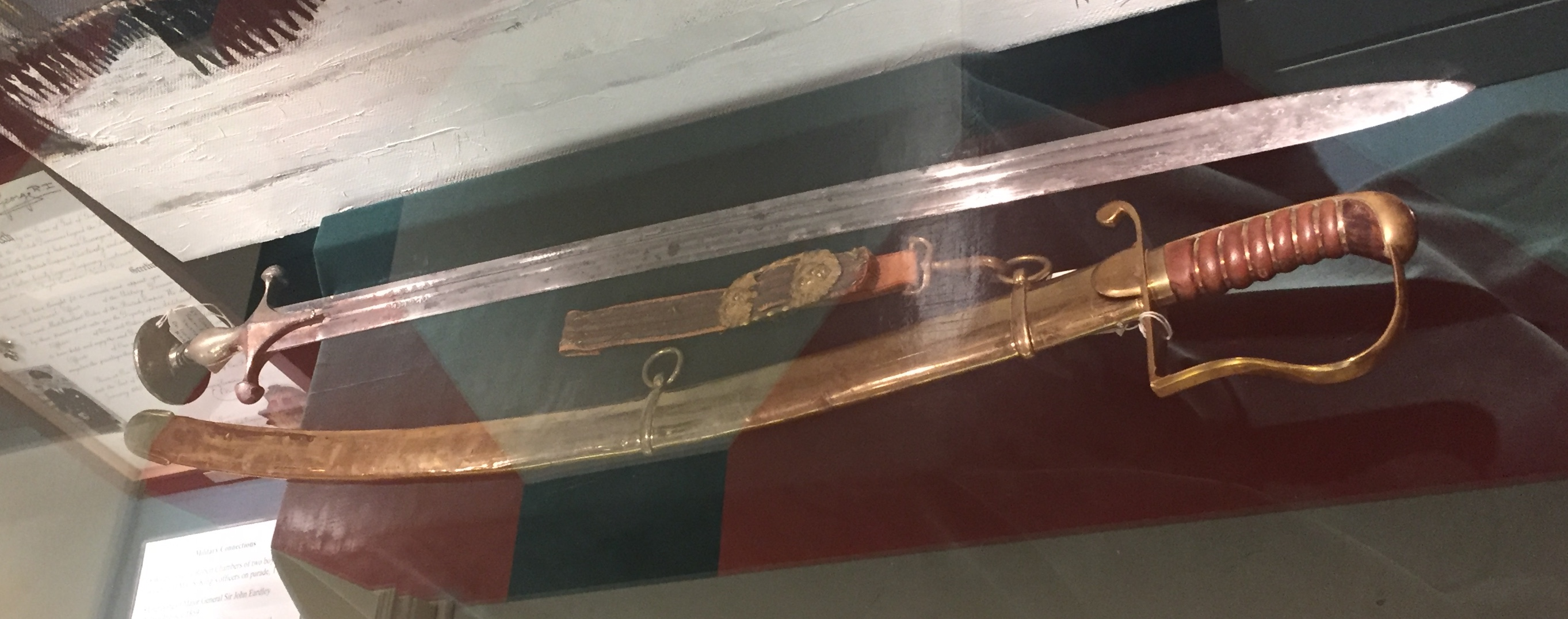
John Eardley Inglis Sword (top) Sir William William's sword (bottom), University of King's College, Library, Halifax, Nova Scotia

=== Politics, posts and promotions ===
He held the Woolwich command, and represented the borough of Calne in parliament from 1856 to 1859. In the lead up to the American Civil War, from 1859 to 1864, he held the position of Commander-in-Chief, North America, and was responsible for preparations for war with the United States if relations broke down. The most severe strain in relations occurring during the Trent Affair. He was promoted to lieutenant-general and appointed colonel-commandant Royal Artillery in 1864.

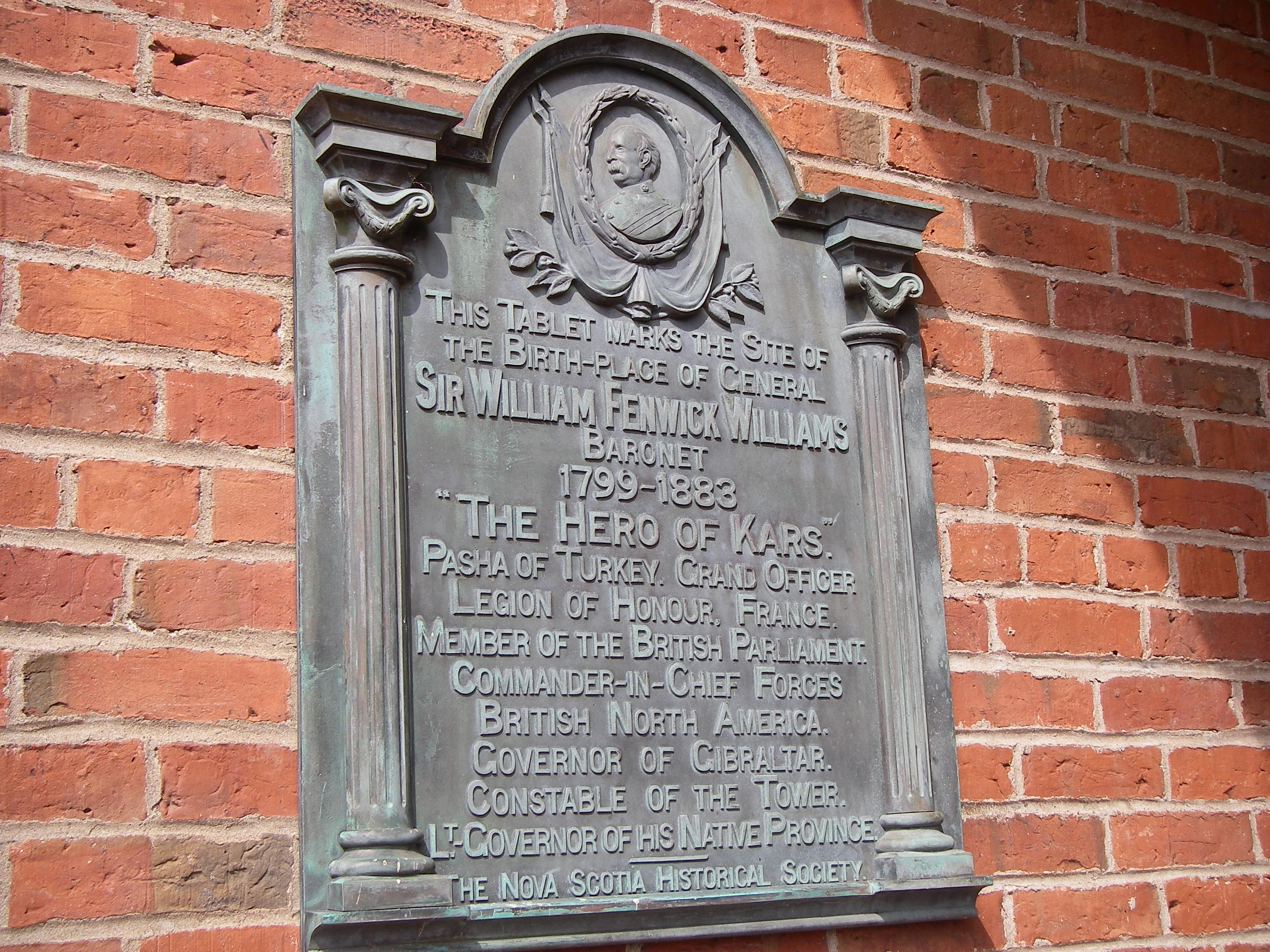
Plaque honouring Sir William Fenwick Williams, Annapolis Royal, Nova Scotia

He held the governorship of Nova Scotia from 1865 to 1867. After Canadian Confederation in 1867, Williams continued in office as the first Lieutenant Governor of Nova Scotia and the governorship of Gibraltar from September 1870 to 1876. He was advanced to GCB in 1871.

=== Final years ===
He was made Constable of the Tower of London in 1881. He died in a hotel in Pall Mall on 26 July 1883 and was buried in Brompton Cemetery.

== Namesakes ==
The village of Port Williams, Nova Scotia and Fenwick Street and Fenwick Tower in Halifax, Canada are all named after him, whilst Karsdale, Nova Scotia, Kars, Ontario and Kars Street in Port Williams after his most famous engagement.

== Arms ==
Coat of arms of Sir William Fenwick Williams, Baronet
Adopted 4 July 1859 Crest Resting on a mural coronet Or a sword and a tilting spear in saltire entwined with a wreath of laurel and ensigned by a scroll proper inscribed KARS in letters Sable Helm Helm of a baronet or knight Escutcheon Azure three men’s heads proper, on a chief embattled Or a mural crown Gules within two branches of laurel bound in base proper Motto CONSTANTIA ET VIRTUTE (Latin for 'By constancy and bravery') Orders Order of the Bath: TRIA UNCTA IN UNO (Latin for 'Three joined in one'); Ich dien (German for 'I serve') Other elements The laurel wreath around the arms indicates the armiger was a recipient of the military division of the Order of the Bath. Red Hand of Ulster baronet badge.

== See also ==
- Military history of Nova Scotia

== Bibliography ==
- Vetch, Robert Hamilton (1900). "Williams, William Fenwick" . In Lee, Sidney (ed.). Dictionary of National Biography. Vol. 61. London: Smith, Elder & Co.
- Vetch, R. H.; Matthew, H. C. G. "Williams, Sir William Fenwick, baronet (1800–1883)". Oxford Dictionary of National Biography (online ed.). Oxford University Press. doi:10.1093/ref:odnb/29561. (Subscription, Wikipedia Library access or UK public library membership required.)

Parliament of the United Kingdom
Preceded by Earl of Shelburne	Member of Parliament for Calne; 1856–1859	Succeeded by Robert Lowe
Military offices
Preceded by Sir William Eyre	Commander-in-Chief, North America; 1859–1865	Succeeded by Sir John Michel
Government offices
Preceded by Lord Airey	Governor of Gibraltar; 1870–1876	Succeeded by Lord Napier
Honorary titles
Preceded by Sir Charles Yorke	Constable of the Tower; Lord Lieutenant of the Tower Hamlets; 1881	Succeeded by Sir Richard James Dacres
Baronetage of the United Kingdom
New creation	Baronet (of Kars); 1856–1883	Extinct
