= Karsdale =

Community in Nova Scotia, Canada

Coordinates: 44°42′9.3″N 65°38′59.09″W

Karsdale in Nova Scotia

Karsdale is a community in the Canadian province of Nova Scotia, located in Annapolis County. It is situated on the west bank of the Annapolis Basin. The community is named after the Siege of Kars and in honor of Sir William Williams, 1st Baronet, of Kars, who defended the town of Kars during the siege.
