= Nikolay Muravyov-Karsky =

Imperial Russian general of the infantry, 1794-1866

Nikolay Nikolayevich Muravyov Karsky
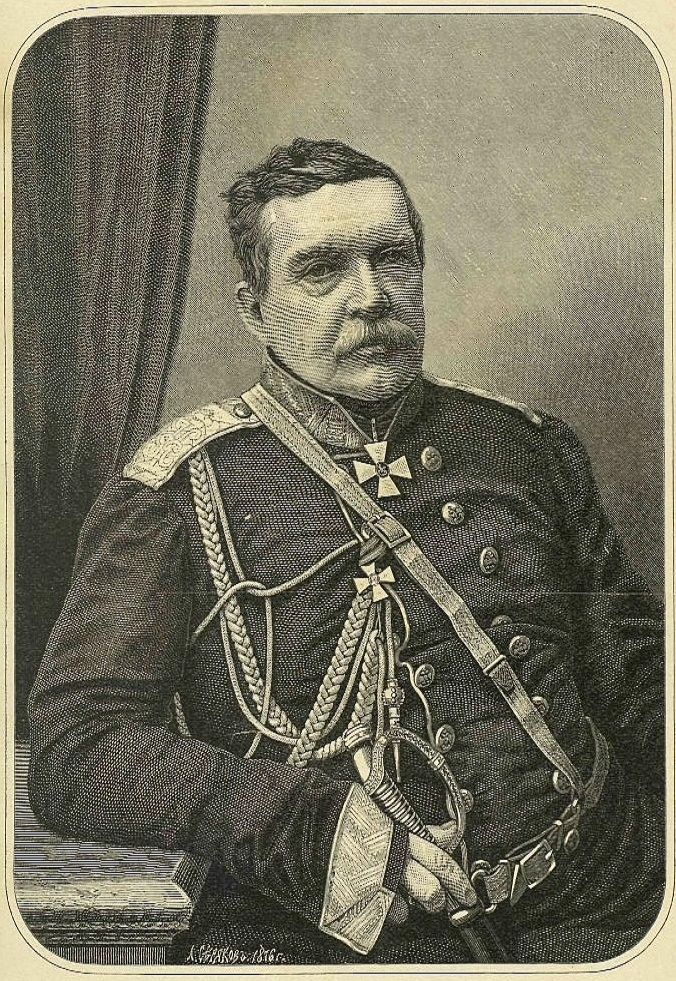
- Nikolay Muravyov-Karsky
- Born: 13 August 1794; Saint Petersburg, Sankt-Peterburgsky Uyezd, Saint Petersburg Governorate, Russian Empire
- Died: 4 November 1866 (aged 72); Skornyakova, Zadonsky Uyezd, Voronezh Governorate, Russian Empire
- Military career
- Allegiance: Russian Empire
- Branch: Imperial Russian Army
- Service years: 1811–1859
- Rank: General of the Infantry
- Conflicts: Napoleonic Wars; Russo-Persian War; Russo-Turkish War; Caucasian War; November Uprising; Hungarian Campaign; Crimean War
- Awards: Order of St. Andrew; Order of St. George

Nikolay Nikolayevich Muravyov-Karsky (Russian: Николай Николаевич Муравьёв-Карский; 13 August 1794 – 4 November 1866 (Note: Julian calendar: 2 Aug. 1794 – 23 Oct. 1866)) was an Imperial Russian military officer, a general of the Russian Army and a writer. A member of the prominent Muravyov family, he became famous for the capture of Kars in 1855 during the Crimean War, following which he became unofficially nicknamed Karsky ("of Kars").

== Biography ==
He founded a circle in Moscow that aimed to establish a republic on Sakhalin Island and was a member of the Sacred Artel circle (St. Petersburg, 1814–17; many members of both circles became Decembrists). In 1816 he was seconded to the commander of the Separate Georgian (from 1820 Separate Caucasian) Corps Lieutenant-General A. P. Yermolov, in 1817 he travelled to Persia as part of an extraordinary embassy. Muravyov took part in an expedition to the eastern shore of the Caspian Sea, negotiated with the Khan of Khiva on trade between the khanate and Russia (1819–20).

Muravyov fought well at the Battle of Akhaltsikhe in the Russo-Turkish War and distinguished himself during the Battle of Warsaw of the November Uprising. Continuing to serve in the military, he took active part in the fights of the Crimean War, being Namestnik and commander of the Separate Caucasus Corps (11.12.1854–3.8.1856). On his arrival in the Caucasus, in a letter to the general of the Infantry Yermolov he accused the Caucasian troops of loss of fighting spirit and "disorder, rooted in many years of careless management" (the letter and a polemical anonymous response to it by Prince D. I. Svyatopolk-Mirsky soon became public). For Muravyov's role in the Siege of Kars, captured on November 28, 1855 (according to Gregorian calendar), "Karski/Karsky" ("of Kars") was added to his surname in society and later in literature, although he did not officially receive this title.

In 1855 he tried to achieve a truce with Shamil. Instead of "formidable expeditions" against the highlanders, which, in his opinion, had no real result, he advocated increased colonization of the occupied territories. Disagreement with these proposals was the reason for his resignation. He also served as a member of the State Council from 1856.

== Writings ==
- Война за Кавказом в 1855 году [War beyond the Caucasus in 1855]. Vols. 1–2. Saint Petersburg, 1876.
- Турция и Египет в 1832 и 1833 годах [Turkey and Egypt in 1832 and 1833]. Pts. 1–4. Moscow, 1870–1874.
- Путешествие в Туркмению и Хиву в 1819 и 1820 годах [Travelling to Turkmenia and Khiva in 1819 and 1820]. Pts. 1–2. Moscow, 1822.
- Русские на Босфоре [Russians on the Bosphorus]. Moscow, 1869.

== Sources ==
- Terebov, O. V. (2023). "МУРАВЬЁВ-КАРСКИЙ НИКОЛАЙ НИКОЛАЕВИЧ". Great Russian Encyclopedia. Electronic version.
