= Mikhail Muravyov =

Mikhail Nikolayevich Muravyov may refer to:

- Mikhail Nikitich Muravyov (1757-1807), Russian poet and prose writer
- Count Mikhail Muravyov-Vilensky (1796-1866), known for his suppression of the Polish-Lithuanian January Uprising of 1863
- Count Mikhail Nikolayevich Muravyov (1845-1900), Russian diplomat and statesman, known for his activities in the Russian Far East
- Mikhail Artemyevich Muravyov (1880–1918), Russian military figure and politician
- Mikhail Muravyov (footballer) (born 1965), Russian footballer
