= Vladimir Muravyov (translator) =

Russian translator

- Born: February 12, 1939; Vitebsk, Soviet Union
- Died: June 10, 2001 (aged 62); Moscow, Russia
- Occupations: Translator, philologist
- Known for: article "Tolkien and Critics" (1976), translation of The Lord of the Rings

Vladimir Sergeyevich Muravyov (Russian: Влади́мир Серге́евич Муравьёв; February 12, 1939 – June 10, 2001) was a Russian translator and literary critic. He was awarded the Inolit Prize for Best Translation in 1987 (The Great Pursuit by Tom Sharpe).

In 1976 Muravyov published a pioneering Russian article in the Soviet Union titled "Tolkien and Critics". Together with Andrey Kistyakovsky, he made the first official, though partial, Russian translation of The Lord of the Rings, published in 1982 with an introductory foreword. Muravyov continued the work after Kistyakovsky's death.

== Life ==
Muravyov graduated from the philological faculty of the Moscow State University. He wrote two monographs on Jonathan Swift (1968, 1972) and several articles on modern English-American science fiction. He was working in the Soviet Library of Foreign Literature when he started the search for Western reviews of The Lord of the Rings. Muravyov noted the furor the book was causing and began discussing it with a few people.

== Translations ==
The Kistyakovsky-Muravyov translation of The Fellowship of the Ring, which was the sole Russian version until 1990, reached second place in a poll on the best Russian translation of The Lord of the Rings, conducted by Russian fan site Tolkien.su. In 1991 Muravyov translated The Two Towers and a year later The Return of the King. His transliteration was adapted for locations in The Lord of the Rings Online: Shadows of Angmar. Muravyov's The Two Towers was criticised for deviations and redundant Russification. Théoden was referred to as konung, while marshal Éomer was titled the Third Seneschal of Mustangrim. Other examples include Tobold Hornblower translated as Tobold Thunderer (Громобой) and the river Entwash, transliterated as Ontawa (Онтава). However it was outlined that Muravyov, avoiding similarities to the Russian word 'fool' (duren), transliterated Durin as Darin and Anduril as Andril. Many tolkienists do not share Muravyov's views on the etymology of hobbits, which he derives from the words homo and rabbit.

Muravyov also translated the works of Washington Irving, O. Henry, F. Scott Fitzgerald, Muriel Spark, Evelyn Waugh and Colin Thiele.

== Personal life ==
Muravyov is the son of literary critic and translator Irina Muravyova (translator) and the stepson of Russian philosopher Grigory Pomerants.

== See also ==
- Translations of The Lord of the Rings
