= Siege of Kars =

1855 battle of the Crimean War

Coordinates: 40.6167°N 43.1000°E

- Part of the Crimean War
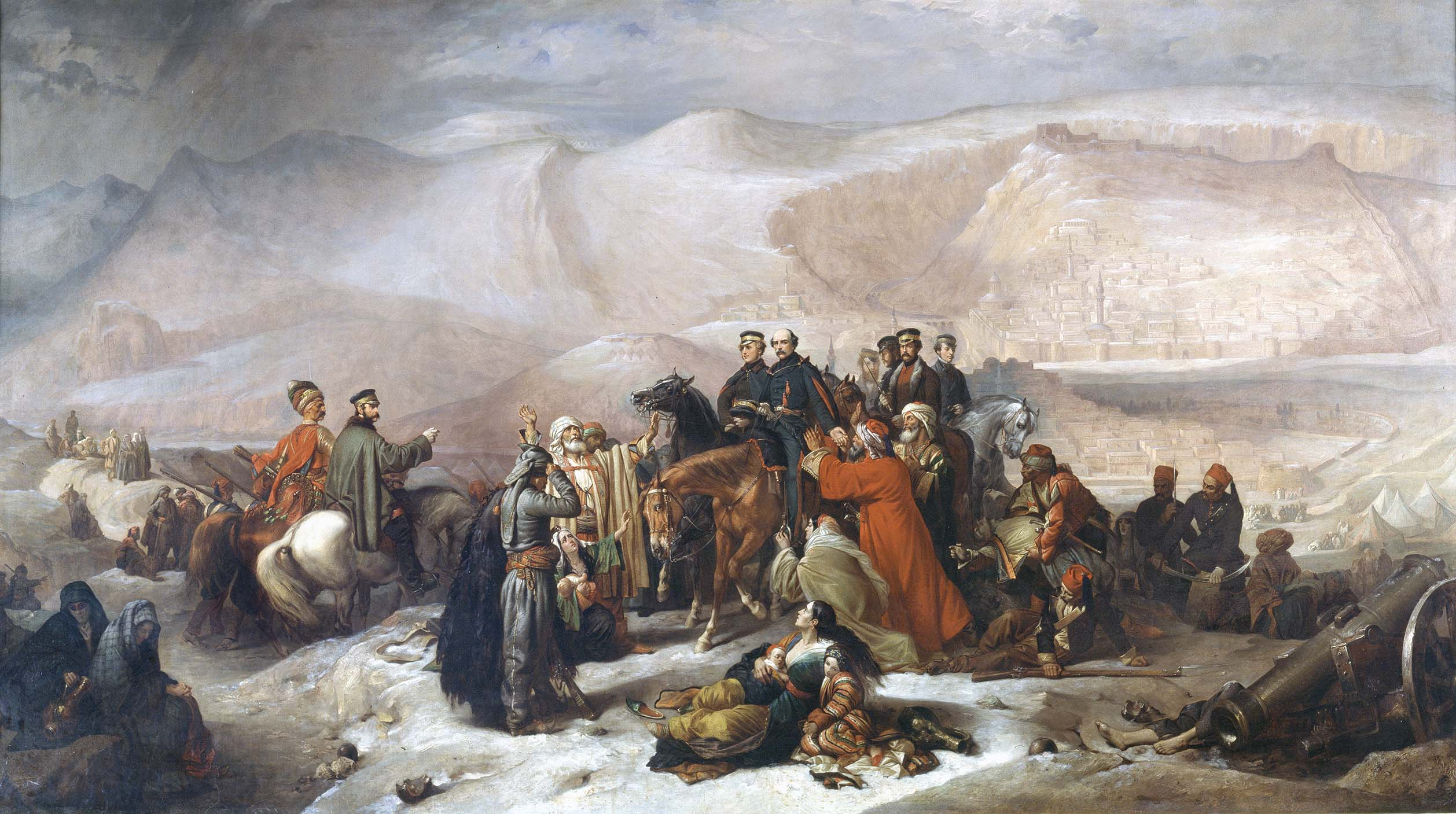
- The Capitulation of Kars, Crimean War, 28 November 1855 by Thomas Jones Barker, 1860
| Date | June – 29 November 1855 |
| Location | Kars, Ottoman Empire |
| Result | Russian victory |

Belligerents
| Ottoman Empire (United Kingdom) British Empire | (Russia) Russian Empire |

Commanders and leaders
| (United Kingdom) William Fenwick Williams (surrendered) (United Kingdom) Christopher Teesdale (surrendered) (Ottoman Empire) Vasıf Pasha (surrendered) (Ottoman Empire) Kerim Pasha (surrendered) (Ottoman Empire) Ismail Pasha (Ottoman Empire) Hurshid Pasha (Ottoman Empire) Emir Bey (Ottoman Empire) Nassim Bey | (Russia) Nikolay Muravyov-Karsky |

Strength
| Regular militaries: 17,000 to 20,400 (Note: "The daily portion of meat for 1 man consisted of 80 drachmas, and the daily allowance for the whole mass of regular troops was 1.632,000 drachmas. According to this calculation it turned out that the daily meat allowance was enough for 20,400 men — the figure of the regular troops who were about half of July in Kars." (N. Muravyov-Karsky; from undercover agent Hüseyin-Effendi-Hassan-Oğlu)); Bashi-bazouks: up to 6,270 (Note: Agent Hüseyin-Effendi-Hassan-Oğlu's testimony. As per the information he possessed, this figure may be higher than the actual one.); Local conscripts: ~1,330; Militias: ~2,000; Total: 33,000 (reinforced) | • Infantry: 19,275; • Cavalry: 6,450; Total: 25,725 96 cannons, 16 rocket launchers |

Casualties and losses
| 18,500 total losses (Note: Not counting the 3,000 who managed to sneak into Erzerum, the 2,000 who remained in hospitals, and the 6,500 redif (army reserve) and militias who were sent home.); 8,500 killed and died of disease (Note: Most of the deaths were caused by starvation which 100 people died from daily during the siege.); 10,000 prisoners and defectors (12 pashas captured); 3,000 escaped to Erzurum; 114 – 136 guns 60 standards | >6,500–7,478 in the storming on Sep. 29 (Note: About 6,500—7,500 losses during a phase of the battle (29 September storming), or 252 officers and 7,226 privates) |

The siege of Kars was the last major operation of the Crimean War. In June 1855, attempting to alleviate pressure on the defence of Sevastopol, Emperor Alexander II ordered General Nikolay Muravyov to lead his troops against areas of Ottoman interest in Asia Minor. Uniting disparate contingents under his command into a strong corps of 25,725 soldiers, 96 light guns, Muravyov decided to attack Kars, the most important fortress of Eastern Anatolia.

== Background ==
Late in 1854, British General William Fenwick Williams had been sent to Kars to assess the situation and report directly to Lord Raglan (FitzRoy Somerset, 1st Baron Raglan), the commander-in-chief of the British expeditionary forces in the Crimea. Williams found the city in a deplorable state. The Ottoman forces included many newly-conscripted recruits, the men had not been paid in months and many had obsolete weapons. Support services such as hospitals were nonexistent. Many of the senior Ottoman officers were absent and lived in Istanbul. Morale was low and desertion high. Appalled by the situation, Williams took command along with several other foreign officers. He quickly set to work to institute discipline, train the troops and reinforce the city's defences. By the spring of 1855, 17,000 troops in high spirits stood ready to defend Kars.

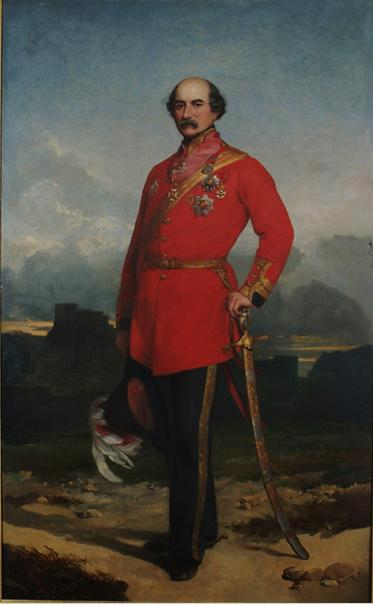
Sir William Williams, 1st Baronet, of Kars by William Gush, Province House (Nova Scotia)

== Siege ==
The first attack was repulsed by the Ottoman garrison under Williams. Muravyov's second assault pushed the Turks back, and he took the main road and the heights over the city, but the renewed vigour of the Ottoman troops took the Russians by surprise. The ferocious fighting that had ensued made them change tactics and start a siege that would last until late November. Upon hearing news of the attack, Ottoman Commander Omar Pasha asked for Ottoman troops to be moved from the line at the siege of Sevastopol and redeployed to Asia Minor mainly with the idea of relieving Kars. After many delays, primarily put in place by Napoleon III, Omar Pasha left the Crimea for Sukhumi with 45,000 soldiers on 6 September.

On September 11, gunfire was fired in the fortress in honor of the fact that the long siege of Sevastopol ended with the victory of the Allies, which fueled the desire of the Russians to storm. Omar Pasha's arrival on the Black Sea coast north of Kars induced Muravyov to begin a third assault on the Ottoman forces, which had been nearly starved. On 29 September, the Russians undertook a general attack on Kars, which lasted seven hours with extreme desperation, but they were repulsed. General Williams remained isolated, however, as Omar Pasha never reached the city. Instead of relieving the garrison he plunged into prolonged warfare in Mingrelia and took Sukhumi in the aftermath. In the meantime, the Ottoman reserves in Kars were running out, and the supply lines had been thinned.

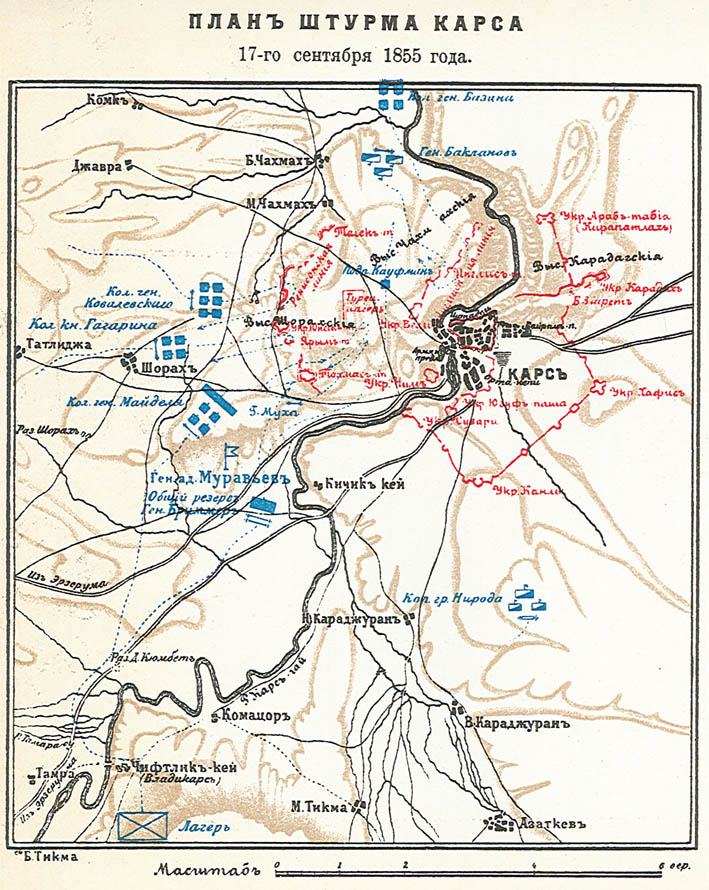
Kars assault plan

Heavy snowfall in late October made the Ottoman reinforcement of Kars quite impractical. Selim Pasha, Omar's son, landed another army at the ancient city of Trebizond, to the west, and began marching south to Erzerum to prevent the Russians from advancing further into Anatolia. The Russians sent a small force from the Kars lines to stop his advance and defeated the Ottomans at the River Ingur on 6 November.

The garrison of Kars declined to face further hardships of the winter siege and surrendered to General Muravyov on 28 November 1855, according to the Gregorian calendar. Muravyov was authorized by the tsar to change his name to "Muravyov-Karsky" to commemorate his part in taking the fortress. On entering the city the Russians "were immediately horrified to discover masses of men too weak to be evacuated, many of them in the throes of death". Despite the lack of aid from Istanbul, Williams remained steadfast to his Ottoman troops and stated that "they fell dead at their posts, in the tents, and throughout the camp, as brave men should who cling to their duty through the slightest glimmering of hope of saving a place entrusted to their custody".

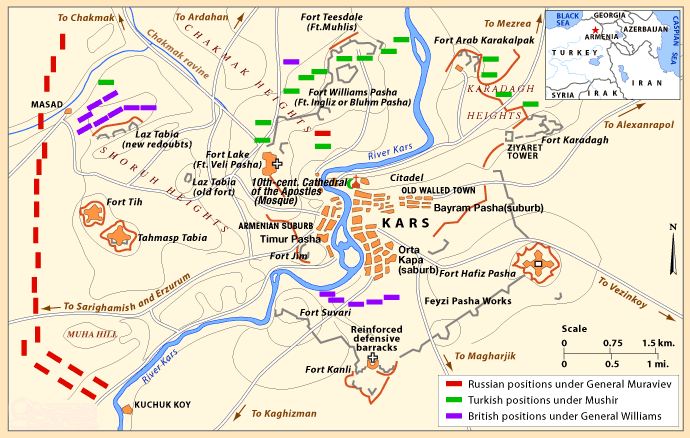
The Siege of Kars, 1855

== Legacy ==
- Namesake of Kars Street, Port Williams, Nova Scotia
- Namesake of Karsdale, Nova Scotia
- Namesake of Kars Parish, New Brunswick
- Namesake of Kars, New Brunswick
- Namesake of Kars, Ontario

== See also ==
- Decline of the Ottoman Empire
