= The Capitulation of Kars =

1860 painting by Thomas Jones Barker

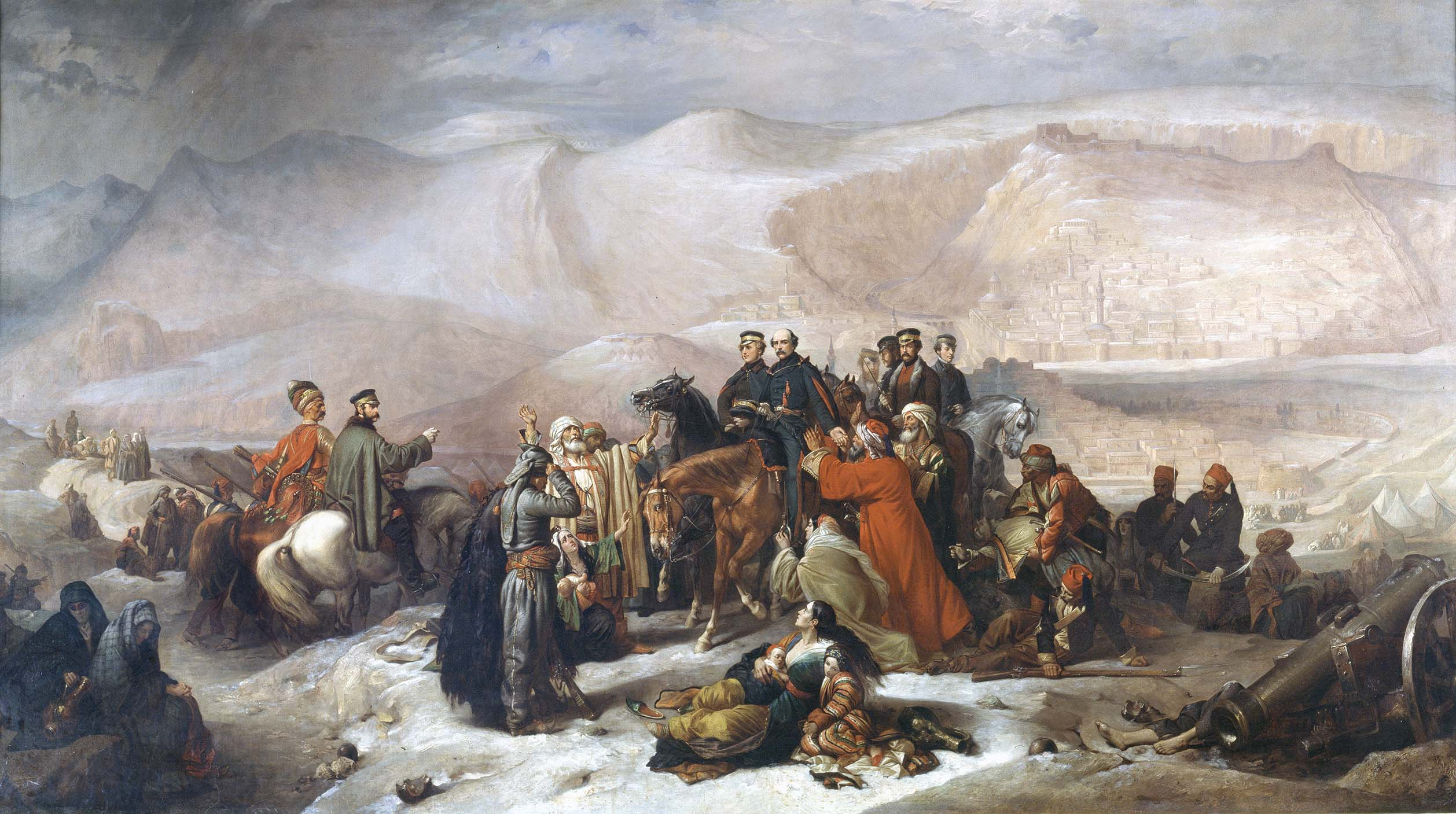
- Artist: Thomas Jones Barker
- Year: 1860
- Type: Oil on canvas, history painting
- Dimensions: 252 cm × 440 cm (99 in × 170 in)
- Location: National Army Museum; Chelsea

The Capitulation of Kars is an 1860 history painting by the British artist Thomas Jones Barker. It displays an incident from the Siege of Kars during Crimean War. On 28 November 1855 the garrison of the Kars in northeastern Anatolia surrendered.

In June 1855 the fortress had come under attack from a Russian Army of 25,000 men.Colonel Fenwick Williams, Britain's military commissioner to the Ottoman Empire took over command of the Turkish garrison, leading them in a lengthy resistance before surrendering being compelled to surrender through the outbreak of cholera, shortage of supplies and ammunition. in recognition of their gallant conduct the garrison were permitted to merch out with the honours of war.

After a period of captivity, William and his staff officers returned as heroes to Britain. The painting is now in the collection of the National Army Museum in Chelsea, having been acquired in 1963.

== Bibliography ==
- Harrington, Peter. British Artists and War: The Face of Battle in Paintings and Prints, 1700-1914. Greenhill Books, 1993.
- Lalumia, Matthew Paul. Realism and Politics in Victorian Art of the Crimean War. UMI Research Press, 1984.
