= John Garth (author) =

British author

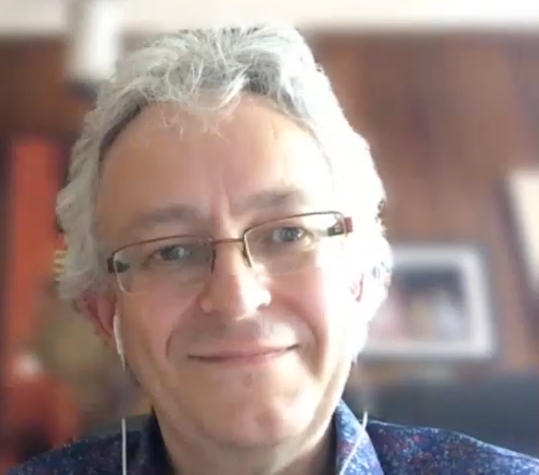
- Garth in 2021
- Education: St Anne's College, Oxford
- Occupations: Journalist; author
- Writing career
- Years active: 1997–present
- Genres: Biography; Tolkien studies
- Website: www.johngarth.co.uk

John Garth is a British journalist and author, known especially for writings about J. R. R. Tolkien including his biography Tolkien and the Great War and a book on the places that inspired Middle-earth, The Worlds of J. R. R. Tolkien. He won a 2004 Mythopoeic Award for Scholarship for his work on Tolkien. The biography influenced much Tolkien scholarship in the subsequent decades.

== Biography ==
John Garth read English at St Anne's College, Oxford. He trained as a journalist and worked for 18 years in newspapers including the Evening Standard in London. He then became a freelance author specialising in J. R. R. Tolkien, while continuing to contribute newspaper articles.

Among his works of Tolkien scholarship are two monographs, namely the 2003 Tolkien and the Great War: The Threshold of Middle-earth and the 2020 The Worlds of J. R. R. Tolkien: The Places that Inspired Middle-earth. His many articles and chapters on Tolkien include "A Brief Biography" in Wiley-Blackwell's 2014 A Companion to J. R. R. Tolkien, and ten historical essays in Routledge's 2006 J. R. R. Tolkien Encyclopedia: Scholarship and Critical Assessment. He has contributed articles and book reviews on Tolkien-related subjects in the specialist journals Tolkien Studies and Mallorn, and in the national press including The Guardian, The Times, The Daily Telegraph, New Statesman, and The Times Literary Supplement.

== Reception ==
=== Tolkien and the Great War ===
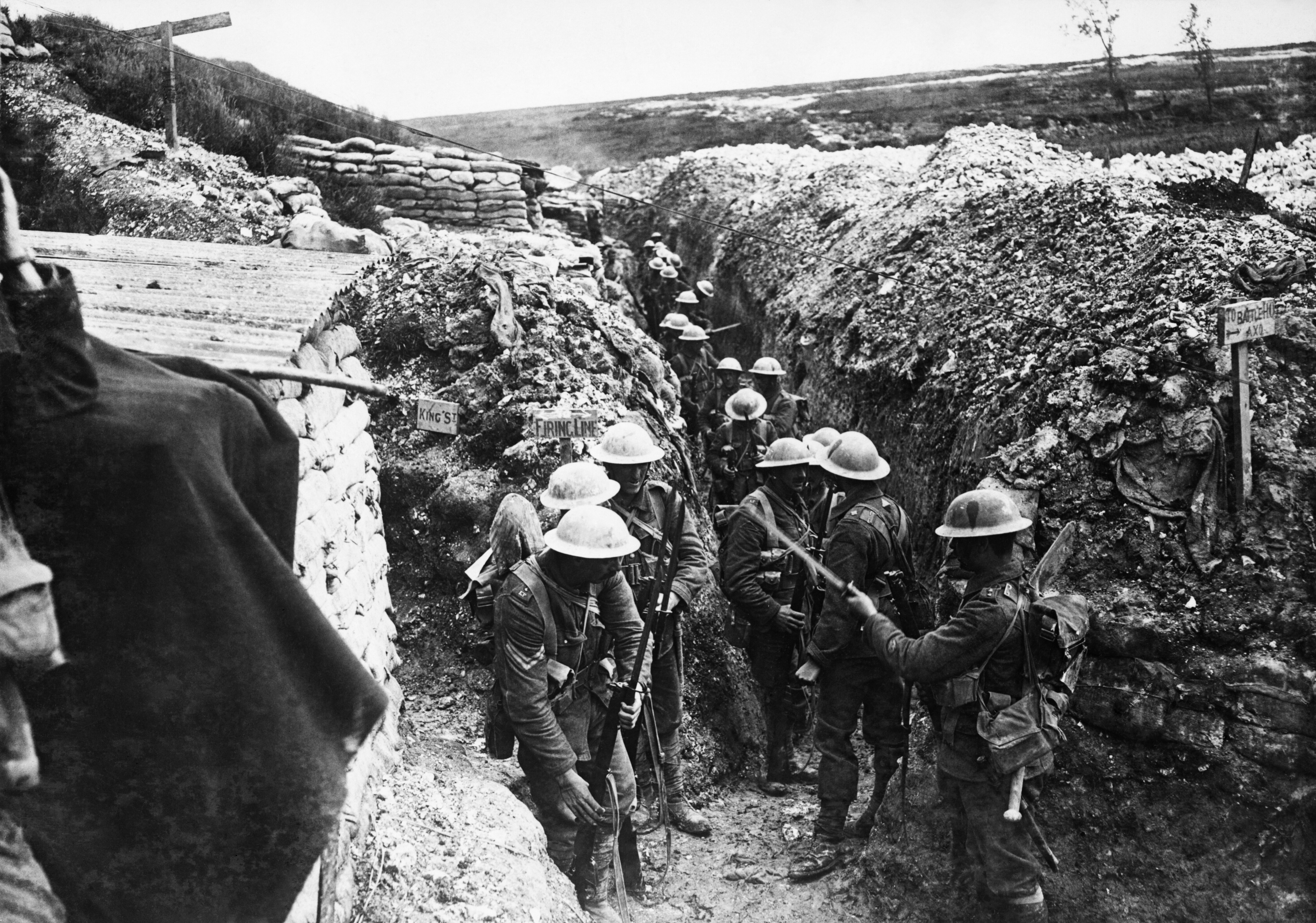
Tolkien fought with the Lancashire Fusiliers (pictured) on the Western Front in 1916.

Luke Shelton, editor of Mallorn, the journal of the Tolkien Society, called Tolkien and the Great War an excellent book on how the First World War might have shaped Tolkien's thought. The Tolkien scholar Janet Brennan Croft, reviewing the same book for World Literature Today, wrote that Garth had ably portrayed Tolkien's early life with his close friends, using their own papers and their British Army company records. She found the first part of the book "somewhat leisurely", but the account of Tolkien's training and battlefield experience was "gripping". Garth's biography of Tolkien in his war years influenced much Tolkien scholarship in the subsequent decades. By 2021, a reviewer was able to state that each of the 16 essays in a scholarly collection was responding to "Garth's seminal [work]".

=== Tolkien at Exeter College ===
The Tolkien scholar Michael Foster, reviewing Tolkien at Exeter College for Mythlore, described it as "a very good thing indeed", even if small (at 64 pages), with "rare photographs" that revealed "a time of innocence, a time of confidences", and serving as a kind of prequel to Tolkien and the Great War.

=== The Worlds of J.R.R. Tolkien ===
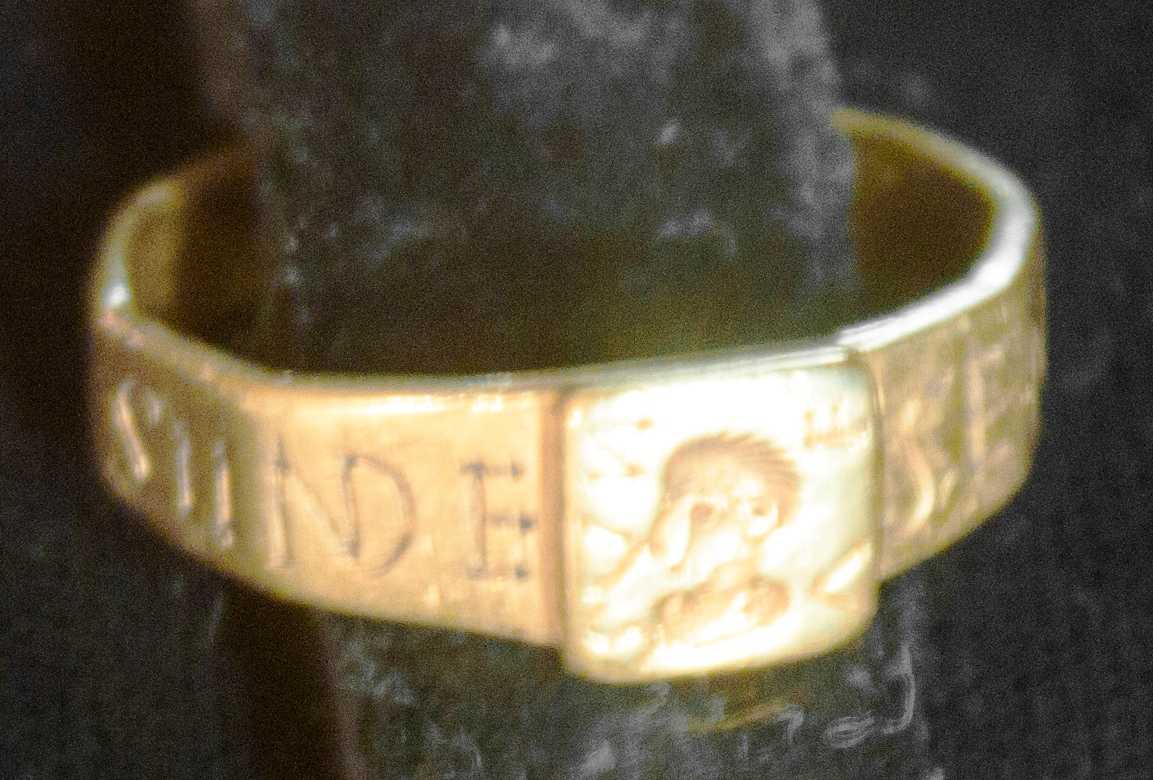
In The Worlds of J.R.R. Tolkien, Garth is critical of the theory that the Ring of Silvianus inspired Tolkien's Ring.

Reviewing The Worlds of J.R.R. Tolkien: The Places that Inspired Middle-earth for Mythlore, Foster described the book as a "masterful study ... encyclopedic in its scope", combining details of Tolkien's life with Middle-earth. He admired the photographs as well as their scholarship and found "virtue" in the journalistic use of sidebars on background topics like Tolkien's debt to Anglo-Saxon cosmology or his mythology for England. He quotes Garth's account of the impact of Tolkien's "many trips to the trenches" in 1916, passing a crossroads where "a calvary had once stood .. at a tree-girt crossroads that the soldiers called Crucifix Corner. Similarly, en route to Mordor, Frodo and Sam see the old stone king at the Crossroads in Ithilien—his head knocked off by orcs yet still whole." Foster comments that "Thus the Somme was reborn as the most horrific geography of Middle-earth. It inspired the Dead Marshes, the Barrow-downs, and Morgul Vale."

== Awards and distinctions ==
- 2004 Mythopoeic Award for Scholarship
- 2014, 2016, 2017 The Tolkien Society Awards (2 best articles, 1 outstanding contribution)
- 2015 Fellow in Humanistic Studies, Black Mountain Institute, University of Las Vegas

== Works ==
Garth has written many articles and book reviews in newspapers and magazines including The Guardian. Some of his major works are listed below.

=== Books ===
- 2003 Tolkien and the Great War: The Threshold of Middle-earth (HarperCollins & Houghton Mifflin). The book has been translated into at least nine languages.
- 2014 Tolkien at Exeter College: How an Oxford undergraduate created Middle-earth (Exeter College)
- 2020 The Worlds of J. R. R. Tolkien: The Places that Inspired Middle-earth (Frances Lincoln & Princeton University Press). The book has been translated into at least ten languages.

=== Chapters ===
- 2006 – ten entries in the J. R. R. Tolkien Encyclopedia (Routledge, ed. Michael D. C. Drout)
- 2014 "A Brief Biography" in A Companion to J. R. R. Tolkien (Wiley-Blackwell, ed. Stuart D. Lee)
- 2014 "'The road from adaptation to invention': How Tolkien came to the brink of Middle-earth in 1914" in Tolkien Studies 11
- 2018 "Tolkien and the Inklings" in Tolkien: Maker of Middle-earth (Bodleian Publishing, ed. Catherine McIlwaine)
- 2019 "Ilu's Music: The Creation of Tolkien's Creation Myth" in Sub-creating Arda (Walking Tree, eds. Dimitra Fimi, Thomas Honegger)
