= The Worlds of J. R. R. Tolkien =

Non-fiction book on Tolkien's Middle-earth

- First British edition
- Editor: John Garth
- Language: English
- Subject: J. R. R. Tolkien
- Publisher: Frances Lincoln
- Publication date: 2020
- Publication place: United Kingdom
- Media type: Hardback
- Pages: 208
- ISBN: 978-0-71124-127-5

The Worlds of J. R. R. Tolkien: The Places that Inspired Middle-earth is a 2020 non-fiction book by the journalist and Tolkien scholar John Garth. It describes the places that most likely inspired J. R. R. Tolkien to invent Middle-earth, as portrayed in his fantasy books The Hobbit and The Lord of the Rings. Those places include many that Tolkien lived in or visited in his early life, as well as sites from history and literature. Most are real, for instance with England as the counterpart of the Shire, though some, like Atlantis, are mythical, and others, like Mirkwood, probably have roots in real places. He notes the ambiguities in some of the connections, and that others have made superficial comparisons, such as of Tolkien's towers with various modern towers in Birmingham, where Tolkien lived as a child. Garth presents his theories of the likely origins of some of these places, supporting these with maps and photographs.

Scholars broadly welcomed the book as a well-researched contribution to Tolkien studies. In their view, it avoids the trap of simply trying to map each feature of Middle-earth to a place in the real world; instead, Garth explains how Tolkien had skilfully interwoven geographic elements to suit his storytelling. The book's popular reception was more mixed; critics noted the book's handsome format and attractive illustrations, while remaining uncertain of its audience and whether its opinions were soundly based.

== Author ==
John Garth read English at St Anne's College, Oxford. He trained as a journalist and worked for 18 years on newspapers including the Evening Standard in London. He then became a freelance author while continuing to contribute newspaper articles. After independently researching Tolkien's world for many years, he became known as an authority on Tolkien with his 2003 book Tolkien and the Great War.

== Book ==
=== Publication history ===
The Worlds of J. R. R. Tolkien was published in 2020 in hardback by Frances Lincoln Publishers in the United Kingdom and by Princeton University Press in the United States. In 2021 it was translated into Czech, French, and German.

=== Content ===
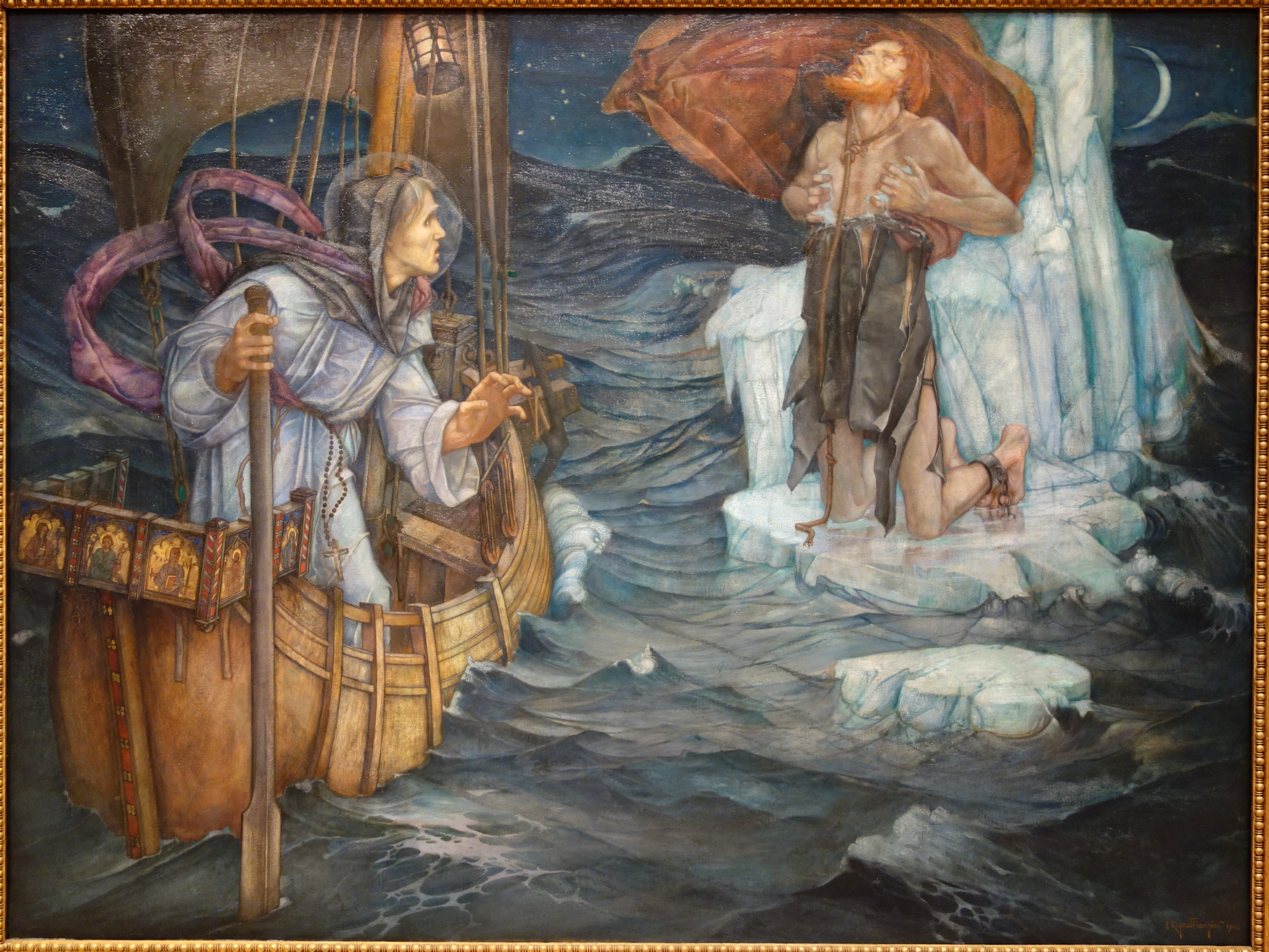
Garth states that the voyages of Brendan influenced Tolkien to create lands across the sea. Painting by Edward Reginald Frampton, 1908

The Worlds of J. R. R. Tolkien begins with a brief introduction in which Garth sets out his approach. He states that he brings "a particular interest in biography, history, landscape and language". On his method, he explains: "I observe Tolkien's footsteps closely, consider the context, and try to enter sympathetically into his creative thoughts and feelings". This is followed by 11 unnumbered chapters that group Tolkien's places by theme, and a detailed set of helps including an appendix, notes, and scholarly bibliography.

The book's chapters begin with England, the origin of many elements of Middle-earth including The Shire; this was the starting-point for both The Hobbit and The Lord of the Rings. Garth then looks in successive chapters at what he considers Tolkien to have viewed as the "Four Winds" (the title of a chapter) from the corners of the Earth, namely Norse myth for the North, Celtic faerie including the Tuatha Dé Danann for the West, ancient Greece for the South with such things as the legend of Atlantis, and Mesopotamia and medieval legends of Alexander the Great for the East. He then examines the origins of Tolkien's mythology for England and his early attempts to connect specific places like Warwick with places such as Kortirion in Middle-earth, and more broadly to map England to his lost western realm of Beleriand.

The chapter "The Shore and the Sea" looks at Tolkien's use of the sea, from his own painting at the Lizard peninsula to the voyages of the Irish saint Brendan. Garth then illustrates Tolkien's mountains, showing what they owe to his sole visit to Lauterbrunnen in Switzerland in 1911 in the "Roots of the Mountains" chapter, including Tolkien's painting of Rivendell. The chapter "Rivers, Lakes, and Waterlands" argues that they have both personalities and symbolic significance; Garth also argues they are connected to places Tolkien knew, like the willow-meads of the River Cherwell, and to the books he read. (Note: Garth 2020, pp. 100–111) A chapter entitled "Tree-Woven Lands" illustrates how important trees were to Tolkien, along with the mythical wild men who inhabited them. Trees and forests are found in abundance in Middle-earth, and the forest of Mirkwood has ancient roots in medieval legends of the Huns and the Goths. Garth notes that these state that Myrkviðr, upon which Mirkwood is based, is by the River Dnieper of Eastern Europe – a fact that Tolkien mentioned in a poem. (Note: Garth 2020, pp. 112–131)

Tolkien was a philologist with a side-interest in archaeology. These concerns are reflected in his many uses of the medieval in Middle-earth, along with earlier elements of the landscape such as long barrows, stone circles, and lake towns, as described in the chapter "Ancient Imprints". (Note: Garth 2020, pp. 132–145) Garth devotes a chapter, "Watch and Ward", to the fortified towers of Middle-earth, including Minas Tirith and Orthanc. He points out that the title of Tolkien's The Two Towers was intentionally ambiguous as to which of the five possible towers were intended. Garth discounts superficial comparisons with modern towers in Birmingham, pointing out multiple origins in landscape and literature, from Faringdon Folly to Dante's Divine Comedy. (Note: Garth 2020, pp. 146–157)

The chapter "Places of War" summarises Garth's research for his earlier book Tolkien and the Great War, showing the profound effect Tolkien's wartime experiences had on his writings. (Note: Garth 2020, pp. 158–173) Finally, Garth looks at the influence of craft and industry on Tolkien's writings, from William Morris's Arts and Crafts movement to the creeping enlargement of industrial Birmingham which swallowed up Tolkien's boyhood home at Sarehole. (Note: Garth 2020, pp. 174–185)

The appendix sets out Garth's views on two matters. First, he explores the possible origins of the One Ring in the Temple of Nodens at Lydney Park, and the possibly associated Ring of Silvianus (the Vyne Ring), which he discounts. Second, he examines Tolkien's much-debated written remark that "Personally I do not think either war (and of course not the atomic bomb) had any influence upon either the plot [of The Lord of the Rings] or the manner of its unfolding. Perhaps in landscape. The Dead Marshes and the approaches to the Morannon owe something to Northern France after the Battle of the Somme. They owe more to William Morris and his Huns and Romans, as in The House of the Wolfings or The Roots of the Mountains." Garth explains Tolkien's remark as two separate statements, with invisible parentheses bracketing the second and third sentences. This would mean that while Tolkien found Morris's writings useful, the war perhaps influenced the shattered landscapes of the Dead Marshes and the approaches to the Morannon (the Black Gate). Other scholars have puzzled over the remark; Garth mentions that Tom Shippey takes it to mean that soldiers in the Great War found Tolkien "more realistic ... than the genteel novels favoured by literary critics". (Note: Garth 2020, pp. 187–188)

The book is illustrated with numerous photographs of places and artefacts that could have inspired Tolkien, maps (both hand-drawn and historic), artworks by Tolkien of Middle-earth and real-world subjects, and artworks that Tolkien might have seen or which illustrate similar themes.

== Reception ==
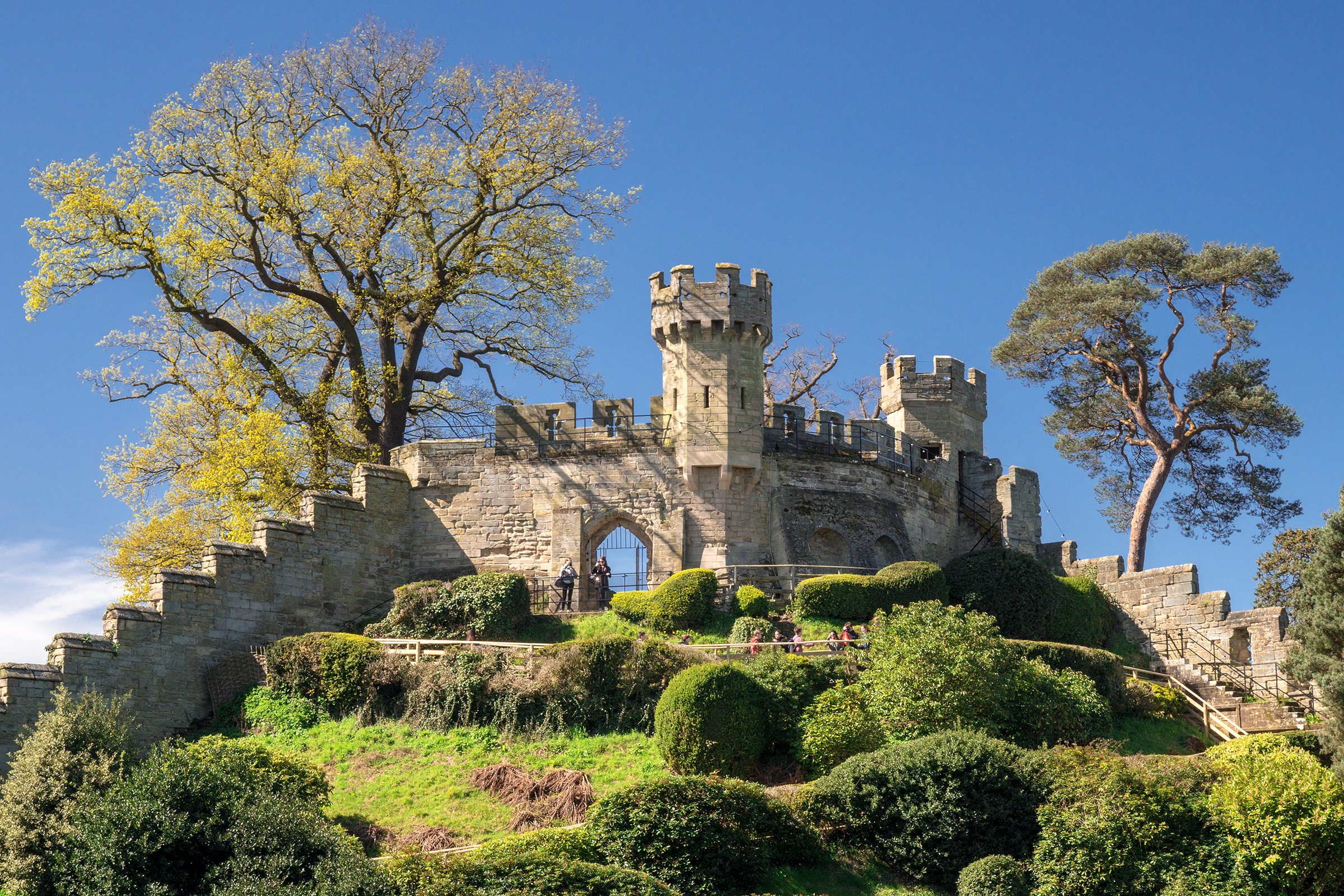
Garth compares Cerin Amroth, a grassy mound in Lothlórien surrounded by two circles of trees, to the Motte of Warwick Castle, known as Ethelfleda's Mound (pictured), where a young Tolkien went with his future wife Edith Bratt. (Note: Garth 2020, pp. 118–121)

The Tolkien scholar Mike Foster writes in a long review in Mythlore, describing the contents of each chapter, that "Tolkien scholarship is much the richer" for the book. Its "prodigal detail" includes drawings never previously published, maps, and paintings that exploit the book's large (8"×10") format as well as Garth's well-researched text and informative sidebars.

The scholar Matthew Fisher, writing in Tolkien Studies, comments that Tolkien scholarship has considered his concern for nature and the environment, and to some extent the geography of Middle-earth, with some "geographic source criticism" that made "an attempt to compile a list of equalities where A in the real world equals B in Middle-earth". In his view, Garth does not do this, but rather looks at the places that inspired Tolkien and shows how he made use of them in varied ways to construct Middle-earth. Fisher quotes Garth's introduction on what he considers a richer approach: "The book ... examines the influences that shaped his imagined cultures and cosmology. It counts place as a combination of location, geology, ecology, culture, nomenclature, and other factors."

Laura Schmidt writes in VII: Journal of the Marion E. Wade Center that Garth is following up on multiple studies of Tolkien's locations, not to mention the tourist industry around some of them in Oxford and elsewhere, but that he separates fact from fiction, listing both his reasoning and his sources. Schmidt states that the book gave her the "revelation" that Tolkien's use of places is like the way he weaves his languages from many materials until, with philological skill, they fit snugly together. Similarly, he mixed and matched places and geographic elements until he had what he wanted.

John L. Murphy, reviewing the book for New York Journal of Books, writes that Garth adds "a careful eye and steady step" to the "ever-proliferating pile of Tolkien-related media". He notes Garth's description of Tolkien's literary approach as using "a paint-box, in which the author dipped, daubed, and mixed layers of color, depth, hue, form, and drama into his vast legacy of narratives." He quotes, too, Garth's "astute caution" to readers that Tolkien described "races and places as seen by medieval poets and chroniclers, not necessarily as they actually were". He notes Garth's correction of Tolkien's biographer, Humphrey Carpenter, who equated Birmingham to the dark land of Mordor; Murphy writes that Garth instead examines "that city's toy industry, and its buildings preserving the Gothic Revival and William Morris' Arts and Crafts Movement of Victorian times", and thus influencing Middle-earth's artistry and craftsmanship. In Murphy's view, both those new to Middle-earth and "veteran pilgrim[s]" will learn much from the book.

Clea Simon, in her review for the arts fuse, called the book beautifully produced and "replete with illustrations" with "evocative landscapes", maps, architectural details, and Tolkien's own paintings, making it in her opinion "a lovely keepsake for fans". She found the works of "lesser artists" to be "less lovely", undercutting Tolkien's own imagination. She called it "a short book ... more an essay than a full manuscript", and repetitive. She noted that Garth was "a painstaking scholar", but that in the book he "ignores the poetry and creativity underpinning Tolkien's classic, dissecting it in an over-thought (and, at times, overwrought) search for connections to the author's real-life experiences". She notes that Garth quotes Gandalf's remark that "he that breaks a thing to find out what it is has left the path of wisdom", and states that Garth is guilty of just that. In her view, the text might have worked well as "a series of speculative essays", but its packaging as a definitive work did a disservice both to Garth and to "the underlying scholarship".

Darragh McManus, reviewing the book for the Irish Independent, considers it best for a general audience that is already familiar with Tolkien's books, since Garth expects detailed knowledge of Tolkien's placenames from his readers. He grants, however, that even specialists would appreciate its visual appeal.

Tom Chivers, reviewing the work for The Times, writes that The Lord of the Rings is not so much an escapist adventure as a tale of heartbreak and the loss of innocence as the world is threatened by overwhelming dark. In his view, Garth takes the book that way, bringing out Tolkien's "elegiac tone", ostensibly describing landscapes that inspired Middle-earth, but "unavoidably, a history of the man and his ideas". Chivers comments that the book is physically beautiful, richly bound and wonderfully illustrated, giving it the look of a coffee-table book. He adds that much of it is "surely speculative" as it expresses many of Garth's opinions and theories.

== Bibliography ==
- Garth, John (2020). The Worlds of J.R.R. Tolkien: The Places that Inspired Middle-earth. London: Frances Lincoln Publishers. ISBN 978-0-71124-127-5.
