= Martin Simonson =

Swedish scholar, novelist, and translator

Martin Simonson is a Swedish scholar, novelist, and translator, specialized in fantasy literature and science fiction. He teaches at the University of the Basque Country in Spain, and is mainly known for being the Spanish translator of some of the works of J.R.R. Tolkien.

Simonson, who was born in Gothenburg, Sweden, in 1973, holds a Ph.D. in English literature (March 2006). Before moving to Spain, he studied psychology, anthropology and creative writing at the University of Göteborg and Fridhems Folkhögskola. He is the author of various novels, among others The Wind of the Wild Lands, the first part of the saga The Faceless Keeper, which takes place in a parallel world and explores themes of identity, personal relationships, the power of nature and spirituality. He has written and edited a number of books on fantasy, science fiction, Western American literature and Gothic horror, and he has translated novels, plays, and graphic novels from English, Swedish and Norwegian into Spanish. Simonson has also published various books and articles on the works of J.R.R. Tolkien and on the representation of nature in fantasy literature, most recently From East to West: The Portrayal of Nature in British Fantasy and its Projection in Ursula K. Le Guin's Western American "Earthsea", published in 2021.

== Academic books ==
- From East to West: The Portrayal of Nature in British Fantasy and its Projection in Ursula K. Le Guin's Western American "Earthsea". With Jon Alkorta. Peter Lang, 2021. ISBN 978-3034342506
- J.R.R. Tolkien y la Tierra Media: Once ensayos sobre el mayor mito literario del siglo XX. (Edition, selection, translation and introduction). With José R. Montejano. Jonathan Alwars, 2021. ISBN 978-8412089578
- El Oeste recuperado: La literatura del pasado y la construcción de personajes en «El Señor de los Anillos». Peter Lang, 2019. ISBN 978-3034337311
- El Western fantástico de Stephen King (with Raúl Montero), Peter Lang, 2017 ISBN 978-3034332323
- Representations of Nature in Middle-earth (Editor), Walking Tree Publishers, 2015 ISBN 978-3905703344
- El héroe del oeste en las Crónicas de Narnia (with Raúl Montero), Peter Lang, 2014 ISBN 978-3034316019
- A Contested West: New Readings of Place in Western American Literature (Editor, with David Rio and Amaia Ibarraran), Portal Education, 2013 ISBN 978-84-939705-8-1
- The Neglected West: Contemporary Approaches to Western American Literature (Editor, with Amaia Ibarraran and David Rio), Portal Education, 2012 ISBN 978-84-938360-1-6
- Beyond the Myth: New Perspectives on Western Texts (Editor, with David Rio and Amaia Ibarraran), Portal Education, 2011, ISBN 978-84-938360-7-8
- The Lord of the Rings and the Western Narrative Tradition, Walking Tree Publishers, 2008, ISBN 978-3-905703-09-2
- J.R.R. Tolkien. Mitopoeia y mitología (Edition, selection and introduction). Essays on J.R.R. Tolkien by Eduardo Segura Fernández. PortalEditions, 2008, ISBN 978-84-936937-7-0

== Anthologies and critical editions ==
- Two British Satires: Gulliver's Travels and The Rivals (Critical edition), Roots of Europe, 2021 ISBN 978-84-09-32705-8
- Gothic Horror: The Castle of Otranto and The Monk (Introduction), Portal Publishing, 2016 ISBN 978-8494197154
- Cuentos del Romanticismo alemán (Editor), Portal Publishing, 2015 ISBN 978-8494197123
- English Poetry 1783-1916: Essential Short Lyrics of the Romantic, Victorian and Edwardian Eras (Editor, introduction, with Raul Montero), Portal Publishing, 2014 ISBN 978-8494197109
- Los Cuentos de Grimm (Editor, critical introduction and notes with Miguel Ayerbe), PortalEditions, 2010 ISBN 978-84-937075-3-8

== Novels ==
- Meddle-earth 5.0, Legendaria Books, 2025 ISBN 978-8410037328
- The Scarecrow's Keys, Legendaria Books, 2025 ISBN 978-8410037281
- Rayos de un sol quebrado, Sapere Aude, 2021 ISBN 978-8418168758
- Rörelser i skogen (with Per Johansson and Thomas Örn Karlsson, Skymning Förlag, 2018) ISBN 978-91-639-8443-3
- Golgrim's Keys (with Raúl Montero, translation into English by Joe Jenner, PortalEditions, 2008) ISBN 978-84-936937-3-2
- Shadows in the Woods (translation into English by Robert Birch, PortalEditions, 2010) ISBN 978-84-937075-2-1
- Anatomy of Air (with Raúl Montero, translation into English by Robert Birch, PortalEditions, 2011) ISBN 978-84-939243-0-0

== Translations ==
- La naturaleza de la Tierra Media, original title The Nature of Middle-earth by J.R.R. Tolkien, Minotauro, 2022 ISBN 978-8445011997
- Hambre, original title Epidemin by Åsa Ericsdotter, Ediciones B, 2021 ISBN 978-8445006733
- Los mundos de J. R. R. Tolkien: Los lugares que inspiraron al escritor, original title The Worlds of J.R.R. Tolkien by John Garth, Minotauro, 2021 ISBN 978-8445006733
- Tolkien. Creador de la Tierra Media, original title Tolkien. Maker of Middle-earth by Catherine McIlwaine, Minotauro, 2020 ISBN 978-8445008607
- Cartas de Papá Noel, original title The Father Christmas Letters by J.R.R. Tolkien, Minotauro, 2019 ISBN 978-8445006733
- La Caída de Gondolin, original title The Fall of Gondolin by J.R.R. Tolkien, Minotauro, 2019 ISBN 978-8445006092
- El niño en la nieve, original title Gutten som elsket rådyr by Samuel Bjørk, Suma, 2019 ISBN 978-8483657980
- Beren y Lúthien, original title Beren and Lúthien by J.R.R. Tolkien, Minotauro, 2018 ISBN 978-8445005064
- Las confesiones de Himmler, original title SS-ledaren Himmlers innersta hemligheter by Arno Kersten, Pasado y Presente, 2017 ISBN 978-8494733390
- El búho, original title Uglen by Samuel Bjørk, Suma de Letras, 2016 ISBN 978-8483657966
- La historia de Kullervo, original title The Story of Kullervo by J.R.R. Tolkien, Minotauro, 2016 ISBN 978-8445003015
- El Señor de los Anillos: Guía de lectura (with Simon Saito, Nur Ferrante and José Elías Álamo Gómez), original title "The Lord of the Rings: Reader's Guide" by Wayne Hammond and Christina Scull, Minotauro, 2015 ISBN 978-8445002780
- Beowulf: Traducción y comentario, incluye Sellic Spell (with Nur Ferrante y Óscar Muñoz), original title Beowulf: A Translation and Commentary, with Sellic Spell by J.R.R. Tolkien, Minotauro, 2015 ISBN 978-8445002605
- Tolkien y la Gran Guerra (with Eduardo Segura), original title "Tolkien and the Great War: The Threshold of Middle-earth" by John Garth, Minotauro, 2014, ISBN 978-8445002070
- Viajo sola, original title Det henger en engel allene i skogen by Samuel Bjørk, Suma de Letras, 2014, ISBN 978-8483656891
- Bésame primero, original title "Kiss Me First", by Lottie Mogach, Suma de Letras, 2014, ISBN 978-6071131447
- Ocultos, original title "Stallo" by Stefan Spjut, Planeta Internacional, 2013, ISBN 978-8408120148
- La batalla que conmocionó Europa: Poltava y el nacimiento del Imperio ruso, original title Poltava, by Peter Englund (Roca Editorial, 2012) ISBN 978-84-9918-488-3
- Invasión!, original title Invasion! by Jonas Hassen Khemiri, Ediciones Irreverentes, 2012 ISBN 978-84-15353-61-4
- Montecore - Un tigre único, original title Montecore - En unik tiger by Jonas Hassen Khemiri, Miscelánea, Roca Editorial, 2011 ISBN 978-84-938644-2-2
- Una vida de lujo, original title Livet deluxe by Jens Lapidus, Suma de Letras, Grupo Santillana, 2011 ISBN 978-84-8365-253-4
- Boardwalk Empire, original title Boardwalk Empire by Nelson Johnson, Suma de Letras, Grupo Santillana, 2011 ISBN 978-84-8365-234-3
- The Pacific, original title The Pacific by Hugh Ambrose, (Suma de Letras, Grupo Santillana, 2011 ISBN 978-84-8365-210-7
- Nunca la jodas, original title Aldrig Fucka Upp by Jens Lapidus, Suma de Letras, Grupo Santillana, 2010 ISBN 978-84-8365-173-5
- Guerra de bandas 145, original title Gängkrig 145 by Jens Lapidus, Suma de Letras, Grupo Santillana, 2010 ISBN 978-84-8365-192-6
