= Walking Tree Publishers =

- Company type: Private
- Industry: Publishing
- Founded: 1996
- Headquarters: Zollikofen (canton of Bern), Switzerland
- Website: www.walking-tree.org

Walking Tree Publishers was founded in 1996 by members of the (now defunct) Swiss Tolkien Society with the aim of publishing the proceedings of the Cormarë conference held that year to mark the 10th anniversary of the Swiss Tolkien Society. The company is run by volunteers and on a nonprofit basis, with surplus money reinvested into new products. It is dedicated exclusively to the publication of English-language works concerned with J. R. R. Tolkien and Tolkien studies.

== Publications ==
=== Cormarë Series ===
- Sherwood, Will, and Julian Eilmann (eds.). The Romantic Spirit in the Works of J.R.R. Tolkien. Walking Tree Publishers 2024, Cormarë No 51, ISBN 978-3-905703-51-1
- Honegger, Thomas. Tweaking Things a Little. Essays on the Epic Fantasy of J.R.R. Tolkien and G.R.R. Martin. Walking Tree Publishers 2023, Cormarë No 50, ISBN 978-3-905703-50-4
- Gallant, Richard Z. Germanic Heroes, Courage, and Fate: Northern Narratives of J.R.R. Tolkien’s Legendarium. Walking Tree Publishers 2024, Cormarë No 49, ISBN 978-3-905703-49-8
- Neubauer, Lukasz (ed.). The Song of the Spheres: Lewis, Tolkien, and the Overlapping Realms of their Imagination. Walking Tree Publishers 2024, Cormarë No 48, ISBN 978-3-905703-48-1
- Rodrigues, Nuno Simões, Martin Simonson, and Angélica Varandas (eds.). Nólë Hyarmenillo: An Anthology of Iberian Scholarship on Tolkien. Walking Tree Publishers 2022, Cormarë No 47, ISBN 978-3-905703-47-4
- Bunting, Nancy, and Seamus Hamill-Keays. The Gallant Edith Bratt. Walking Tree Publishers 2021, Cormarë No 46, ISBN 978-3-905703-46-7
- Williams, Hamish (ed.). Tolkien and the Classical World. Walking Tree Publishers 2021, Cormarë No 45, ISBN 978-3-905703-45-0
- Neubauer, Lukasz (ed.). Middle-earth or There and Back Again. Walking Tree Publishers 2020, Cormarë No 44, ISBN 978-3-905703-44-3
- Boto, José María Miranda. Law, Government, and Society in J.R.R. Tolkien's Works. Walking Tree Publishers 2022, Cormarë No 43, ISBN 978-3-905703-43-6
- Arduini, Roberto, Giampaolo Canzonieri, and Claudio A. Testi (eds.). Tolkien and the Classics. Walking Tree Publishers 2019, Cormarë No 42, ISBN 978-3-905703-42-9
- Croft, Janet Brennan, and Annika Röttinger (eds.). "Something Has Gone Crack": New Perspectives on J.R.R.Tolkien in the Great War. Walking Tree Publishers 2019, Cormarë No 41, ISBN 978-3-905703-41-2
- Fimi, Dimitra, and Thomas Honegger (eds.). Sub-creating Arda: World-building in J.R.R. Tolkien's Works, its Precursors, and Legacies. Walking Tree Publishers 2019, Cormarë No 40, ISBN 978-3-905703-40-5
- Eilmann, Julian, and Friedhelm Schneidewind (eds.). Music in Tolkien's Work and Beyond. Walking Tree Publishers 2019, Cormarë No 39, ISBN 978-3-905703-39-9
- Testi, Claudio A. (ed.). Pagan Saints in Middle-earth. Walking Tree Publishers 2018, Cormarë No 38, ISBN 978-3-905703-38-2
- Kirner-Ludwig, Monika, Stephan Köser, and Sebastian Streitberger (eds.). Binding them all: Interdisciplinary Perspectives on JRR Tolkien and His Works. Walking Tree Publishers 2017, Cormarë No 37, ISBN 978-3-905703-37-5
- Eilmann, Julian. J.R.R. Tolkien, Romanticist and Poet. Walking Tree Publishers 2017, Cormarë No 36, ISBN 978-3-905703-36-8
- Honegger, Thomas, and Maureen F. Mann (eds.). Laughter in Middle-earth: Humour in and around the Works of J.R.R. Tolkien. Walking Tree Publishers 2016, Cormarë No 35, ISBN 978-3-905703-35-1
- Simonson, Martin (ed.). Representations of Nature in Middle-earth. Walking Tree Publishers 2015, Cormarë No 34, ISBN 978-3-905703-34-4
- Curry, Patrick. Deep Roots in a Time of Frost: Essays on Tolkien. Walking Tree Publishers 2014, Cormarë No 33, ISBN 978-3-905703-33-7
- Arduini, Roberto, and Claudio A. Testi (eds.). Tolkien and Philosophy. Walking Tree Publishers 2014, Cormarë No 32, ISBN 978-3-905703-32-0
- Honegger, Thomas, and Dirk Vanderbeke (eds.). From Peterborough to Faëry: The Poetics and Mechanics of Secondary Worlds. Walking Tree Publishers 2014, Cormarë No 31, ISBN 978-3-905703-31-3
- Ryan, J. S. In the Nameless Wood: Explorations in the Philological Hinterland of Tolkien's Literary Creations. Walking Tree Publishers 2013, Cormarë No 30, ISBN 978-3-905703-30-6
- Kowalik, Barbara (ed.). O What a Tangled Web: Tolkien and Medieval Literature: A View from Poland. Walking Tree Publishers 2013, Cormarë No 29, ISBN 978-3-905703-29-0
- Eilmann, Julian, and Allan Turner (eds.). Tolkien’s Poetry. Walking Tree Publishers 2013, Cormarë No 28, ISBN 978-3-905703-28-3
- Klinger, Judith (ed.). Sub-creating Middle-earth – Constructions of Authorship and the Works of J.R.R. Tolkien. Walking Tree Publishers 2012, Cormarë No 27, ISBN 978-3-905703-27-6
- Arduini, Roberto, and Claudio A. Testi (eds.). The Broken Scythe: Death and Immortality in the Works of J.R.R. Tolkien. Walking Tree Publishers 2012, Cormarë No 26, ISBN 978-3-905703-26-9
- Vink, Renée. Wagner and Tolkien: Mythmakers. Walking Tree Publishers 2012, Cormarë No 25, ISBN 978-3-905703-25-2
- MacLachlan, Christopher. Tolkien and Wagner: The Ring and Der Ring. Walking Tree Publishers 2012, Cormarë No 24, ISBN 978-3-905703-21-4
- Nagel, Rainer. Hobbit Place-names: A Linguistic Excursion through the Shire. Walking Tree Publishers 2012, Cormarë No 23, ISBN 978-3-905703-22-1
- Hilley, Margaret. The Loss and the Silence: Aspects of Modernism in the Works of C.S. Lewis, J.R.R. Tolkien & Charles Williams. Walking Tree Publishers 2011, Cormarë No 22, ISBN 978-3-905703-19-1
- Campbell, Liam. The Ecological Augury in the Works of JRR Tolkien. Walking Tree Publishers 2011, Cormarë No 21, ISBN 978-3-905703-18-4
- Steimel, Heidi, and Friedhelm Schneidewind (eds.). Music in Middle-earth. Walking Tree Publishers 2010, Cormarë No 20, ISBN 978-3-905703-14-6
- Ryan, J. S. Tolkien's View: Windows into his World. Walking Tree Publishers 2009, Cormarë No 19, ISBN 978-3-905703-13-9
- Caldecott, Stratford, and Thomas Honegger (eds.). Tolkien's The Lord of the Rings – Sources of Inspiration. Walking Tree Publishers 2008, Cormarë No 18, ISBN 978-3-905703-12-2
- Hiley, Margaret, and Frank Weinreich (eds.). Tolkien’s Shorter Works: Essays of the Jena Conference 2007. Walking Tree Publishers 2008, Cormarë No 17, ISBN 978-3-905703-11-5
- Simonson, Martin. The Lord of the Rings and the Western Narrative Tradition. Walking Tree Publishers 2008, Cormarë No 16, ISBN 978-3-905703-09-2
- Turner, Allan (ed.) The Silmarillion Thirty Years On. Walking Tree Publishers 2007, Cormarë No 15, ISBN 978-3-905703-10-8
- Segura, Eduardo, and Thomas Honegger (eds.). Myth and Magic: Art According to the Inklings. Walking Tree Publishers 2007, Cormarë No 14, ISBN 978-3-905703-08-5
- Lam, Adam, and Nataliya Oryshchuk (eds.). How We Became Middle-earth: A Collection of Essays on The Lord of the Rings. Walking Tree Publishers 2007, Cormarë No 13, ISBN 978-3-905703-07-8
- Smith, Ross. Inside Language: Linguistic and Aesthetic Theory in Tolkien. Walking Tree Publishers 2007, Second edition 2011, Cormarë No 12, ISBN 978-3-905703-20-7
- Shippey, Tom (ed.). Roots and Branches. Walking Tree Publishers 2007, Cormarë No 11, ISBN 978-3-905703-05-4
- Honegger, Thomas, and Frank Weinreich (eds.). Tolkien and Modernity 2. Walking Tree Publishers 2006, Cormarë No 10, ISBN 978-3-905703-03-0
- Honegger, Thomas, and Frank Weinreich (eds.). Tolkien and Modernity 1. Walking Tree Publishers 2006, Cormarë No 9, ISBN 978-3-905703-02-3
- Honegger, Thomas (ed.). Reconsidering Tolkien. Walking Tree Publishers 2005, Cormarë No 8, ISBN 978-3-905703-00-9
- Garbowski, Christopher. Recovery and Transcendence for the Contemporary Mythmaker: The Spiritual Dimension in the Works of J.R.R. Tolkien. Walking Tree Publishers 2004, Cormarë No 7, ISBN 978-3-9521424-8-6
- Honegger, Thomas (ed.). Translating Tolkien: Text and Film. Walking Tree Publishers 2004, Second edition 2011, Cormarë No 6, ISBN 978-3-905703-16-0
- Hooker, Mark T. Tolkien Through Russian Eyes. Walking Tree Publishers 2003, Cormarë No 5, ISBN 978-3-9521424-7-9
- Honegger, Thomas (ed.). Tolkien in Translation. Ed. Thomas Honegger. Walking Tree Publishers 2003, Second edition 2011, Cormarë No 4, ISBN 978-3-905703-15-3
- Sturch, Richard. Four Christian Fantasists: A Study of the Fantastic Writings of George MacDonald, Charles Williams, C.S. Lewis and J.R.R. Tolkien. Walking Tree Publishers 2001, Cormarë Series No. 3.
- Shippey, Tom (ed.). Root and Branch - Approaches towards Understanding Tolkien. Walking Tree Publishers 1999, Cormarë Series No. 2, ISBN 3-9521424-1-7
- Buchs, Peter, and Thomas Honegger (eds.). News from the Shire and Beyond – Studies on Tolkien. Walking Tree Publishers 1997, Cormarë Series No. 1, ISBN 3-9521424-0-9

=== Beowulf and the Dragon ===
- Beowulf and the Dragon. Old English Text and Translation of the 'Dragon Episode' illustrated by Anke Eißmann, translated by John Porter, foreword by Tom Shippey. Walking Tree Publishers 2009, ISBN 978-3-905703-17-7

=== Tales of Yore Series ===
- Louis, Edward S. The Monster Specialist. Tales of Yore Series No. 3. Walking Tree Publishers, 2014, ISBN 978-3-905703-23-8
- Woollard, Kay. Wilmot's Very Strange Stone. Tales of Yore Series No. 2. Walking Tree Publishers 2002, ISBN 978-3-9521424-4-8
- Woollard, Kay. The Terror of Tatty Walk. Tales of Yore Series No. 1. Walking Tree Publishers 2000, ISBN 978-3-9521424-2-4
