= Thomas Honegger =

Tolkien scholar

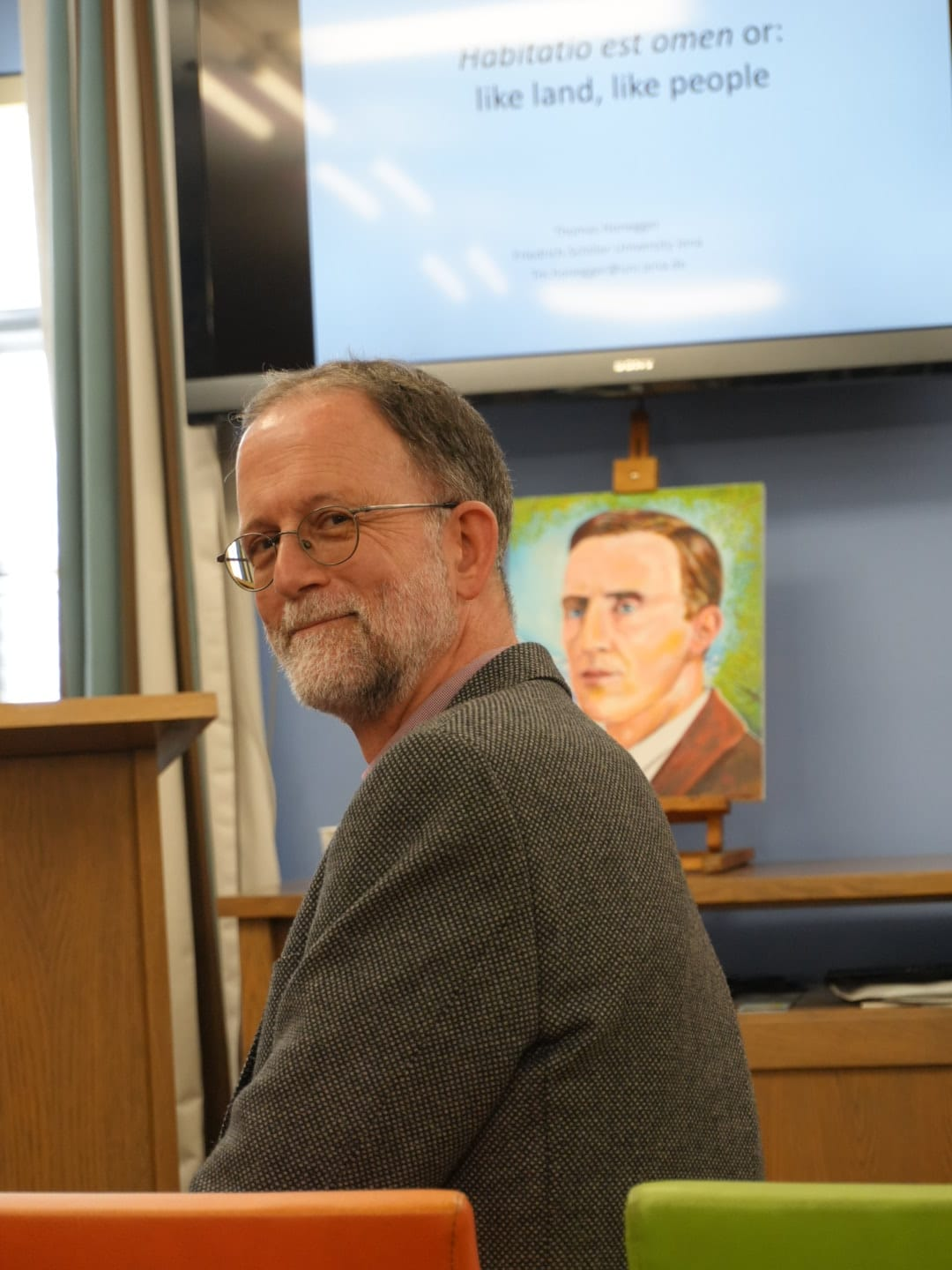
Thomas Honegger in 2026

Thomas Honegger (born 1965 in Zurich) is a Swiss scholar of medieval literature and medievalism, known especially for his studies of J. R. R. Tolkien's Middle-earth.

== Biography ==
Thomas Honegger obtained an MA in English Studies, Medieval Germanic Languages, and Medieval German Literature from the University of Zurich. He then worked in that university's Department of English as an assistant. He took his PhD in 1996 on the subject of "Animals in Medieval English Literature". He worked as a researcher at the University of Sheffield and at the Sorbonne Nouvelle, before becoming a lecturer at the University of Zurich. In 2001 he received the call to the University of Jena and became Professor of English Medieval Studies at the Friedrich Schiller University, Jena in 2002. He has published widely on the life and work of J.R.R. Tolkien and contributed, among other things, a chapter on Tolkien's academic writings to Wiley-Blackwell's A Companion to J. R. R. Tolkien, published in 2014.

== Books (authored) ==
- 1996: From Phoenix to Chauntecleer: Medieval English Animal Poetry . Francke Verlag.
- 2019: Introducing the Medieval Dragon. Cardiff: University of Wales Press.
- 2023: Tweaking Things a Little: Essays on the Epic Fantasy of JRR Tolkien and GRR Martin. Walking Tree Publishers.

== Books (edited or co-edited) ==
- 2004: Riddles, knights and cross-dressing saints : essays on medieval English language and literature. Bern, Berlin, Oxford: Peter Lang.
- 2004: Translating Tolkien: Text and Film. Walking Tree Publishers. Reprinted 2011.
- 2004: News from the Shire and Beyond: Studies on Tolkien, with Peter Buchs. Zurich: Walking Tree Publishers.
- 2005: Reconsidering Tolkien, Zurich: Walking Tree Publishers.
- 2006: Tolkien and Modernity, with Frank Weinreich (eds.) 2 vols.
- 2007: Myth and magic : art according to the Inklings. Zollikofen: Walking Tree Publishers.
- 2011: Tolkien in Translation, with Eduardo Segura. Zurich: Walking Tree Publishers.
- 2014: Crime and the Fantastic 1 & 2, with Fanfan Chen. Trier: Wissenschaftlicher Verlag Trier.
- 2016: Fantastic Animals, animals in the fantastic, with Oliver Bidlo, Frank Weinreich, Erwin Otto. Trier: Wissenschaftlicher Verlag Trier.
- 2016: Laughter in Middle-earth: Humour in and around the Works of J.R.R. Tolkien, with Maureen F. Mann. Jena: Walking Tree Publishers.
- 2017: Subcreation: world-building in the fantastic, with Erwin Otto. Trier: Wissenschaftlicher Verlag Trier.
- 2019 Sub-creating Arda, with Dimitra Fimi (eds). Walking Tree Publishers.

== Reception ==
Harley Sims, reviewing Tolkien in Translation, notes that few topics are more interesting or more divisive. He comments that "one might say that translation is Tolkien, and that no analysis of his work can pretend to be complete without some exegesis of his actual wording." Finding the book a good introduction to its subject's theory and practice, and making both the cultural and literary aspects accessible, Sims commends Honegger and the publishers for assembling "specialists in five languages".
