= Michael Foster (Tolkien scholar) =

Emeritus professor of English and a Tolkien scholar

Michael Foster

Michael Foster (December 28, 1946 - April 12, 2023), known as Mike Foster, was an emeritus professor of English and a Tolkien scholar. In 1978 he pioneered the teaching of Tolkien studies at university level.

== Biography ==
[My students] wanted a class on Tolkien alone. So in 1977, ... I took a petition signed by fifteen students requesting such a course to my department chairman, and he agreed to schedule Lit. 116: Special Studies: J.R.R. Tolkien for the next term. Of course, only one of the fifteen who signed up showed up. But twenty others did, and the Tolkien course has continued at Illinois Central College since then, with the exception of four years at the end of the last century when it was cast into darkness and doom by a Balrog dean...

The four essays required for [the course cover] four approaches to the study of literature: analysis of a small section, examination of a possible literary source, evaluation of a critical study, and commentary on the evolution of a single character.

The principal advantage of a course centered on Tolkien, as opposed to, say, Shakespeare, is that many students have read all the author's major works...

— Mike Foster: Teaching Tolkien

=== Early life and education ===
Michael Alan Foster was born in Peoria, Illinois to Shirley Jane Hopkins and Claude Swadley Foster on 28 December 1946. He was educated at St Bernard's School and Spalding High School, Peoria, Illinois. He obtained his first degree in English and Journalism at Marquette University in 1968; while there his feature writing won the 1967 William Randolph Hearst Foundation Award. That year he became a teacher at Spalding High School. He then took a Master's degree at Marquette.

=== Career ===
In 1971, Foster joined the staff of the English department of Illinois Central College in Peoria, eventually becoming a professor there. In addition, he worked as a journalist for the Peoria Journal Star. He taught at Illinois Central College until he retired in 2005.

=== Personal life ===
On 14 June 1969, Foster married Joanne Weslowski in Milwaukee, Wisconsin. They had two daughters. He died in Peoria on 12 April 2023.

== Fantasy and Tolkien studies ==
While at Illinois Central College, Foster taught fantasy literature from 1974, and a special studies course focusing entirely on J. R. R. Tolkien from 1978. This represented what in the context of sceptical attitudes was "a rare success" in the early history of Tolkien research; Foster later documented his teaching approach on the course in "an appropriately anecdotal piece".

Foster has published many papers and book reviews on English fantasy literature, including on the Inklings Tolkien, C. S. Lewis, and George Sayer, as well as on J. M. Barrie and G. K. Chesterton.

Foster was a known Tolkien scholar; the Washington Post described him as "somewhat of an authority on all things Tolkien". In 1995 he became the North American representative of The Tolkien Society. He was on the Mythopoeic Society's Inklings scholarship committee. The Illinois Community College Journalism Association's top award, The Mike Foster General Excellence Award, is named in his honor.
