= Ring of Silvianus =

Gold ring discovered in Hampshire, England, in 1785

The Vyne Ring is a Roman gold ring of around the 4th century.

The Vyne Ring, the Ring of Senicianus or the Ring of Silvianus is a gold ring, dating probably from the 4th century AD, discovered while ploughing a field near Silchester, in Hampshire, England, before 1786.

After its discovery in the 18th century, the ring became the property of the Chute family, whose country house was The Vyne, also in Hampshire, now a National Trust property. The ring went on display there in April 2013.

Before 1812, a curse tablet mentioning the name Senicianus was found at Lydney Park in Gloucestershire, England. The ring has been suggested to be originally the property of a British Roman called Silvianus, apparently stolen or otherwise misappropriated by a person named Senicianus, upon whom Silvianus called down a curse. Other authors suggested that the connection between the ring and the curse tablet should not be assumed just from the coincidence of the names.

In 1929, during excavations of the site of the Roman temple of Nodens at Lydney Park, the archaeologist Sir Mortimer Wheeler reviewed previous finds at the site and became interested in the curse tablet. As Wheeler consulted with J. R. R. Tolkien on the name of the god invoked in the curse, the ring and curse may have inspired the One Ring in The Hobbit and The Lord of the Rings. The Tolkien Society worked with the National Trust to display the ring but the latter is lately more sceptical about the connection.

== Description ==
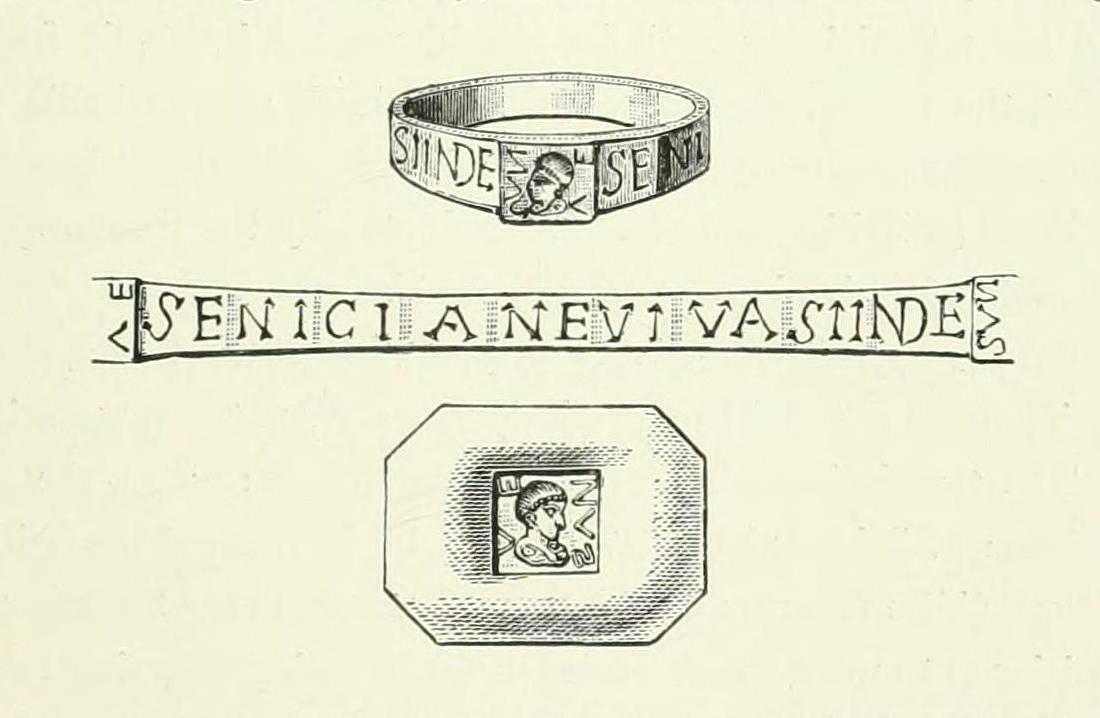
Woodcuts of the Vyne Ring from A History of the Vyne in Hampshire.

The Ring of Silvianus is larger than most rings, being 25 mm (1 in) in diameter and weighing 12 g (0.4 oz), and was perhaps intended to be worn over a glove. The band of the ring has ten facets. It is set with a square bezel engraved with an image of the goddess Venus. To one side are the letters "VE" and to the other side "NVS", in mirror writing. When used as a signet ring to make a seal, the head and script would be raised, and the letters would appear the right way around.

The band is inscribed with the words "SENICIANE VIVAS IIN DE". It has been suggested that the inscription should have finished "VIVAS IN DEO" – a common inscription for Roman Christians, meaning "live in God" This would mean the engraving contains two errors as the "I" had been doubled, leaving no room for the last letter "O".

Chaloner W. Chute reported a translation of the inscription by the Rev. J.G. Joyce of the Silchester Museum. Joyce took the Latin inscription as written, reading it as "Seniciane vivas IInde (i.e. secunde)". Chute gave the translation into English as "O Senicianus, mayest thou live prosperously!", seeing the abbreviation and wordplay in II signifying 2 and secunde meaning both fortunate and second (2nd).

== History ==
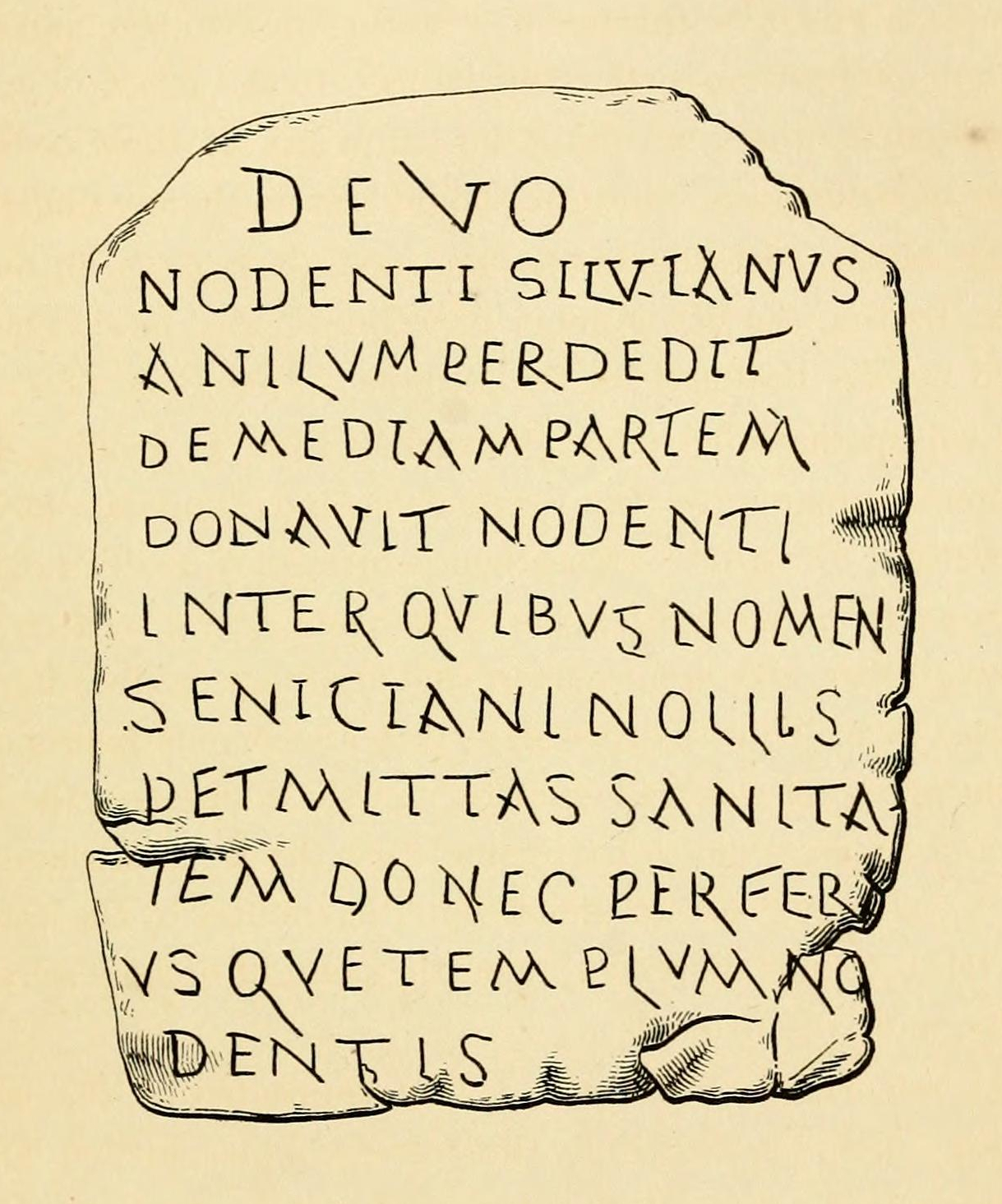
Curse Tablet found at Lydney Park

Places associated with the ring

The Ring of Silvianus was discovered in 1785 in the field of a farm near Silchester, a town of Roman origins, and the site of many archaeological discoveries. It is unknown how the ring came to be located at The Vyne, but it is presumed that the farmer who found the ring sold it to the family, who were known to have an interest in history and antiquities.

Before 1812, a plaque of a type known as a "curse tablet" or defixio was discovered at the site of a Roman temple dedicated to the local god Nodens at Lydney Park, Gloucestershire, 70 miles (110 km) from The Vyne. Made of lead, the plaque is 3 1/8 in (79 mm) high and 2 1/2 in (64 mm) wide. The plaque was inscribed with a curse:

DEVO NODENTI SILVIANVS ANILVM PERDEDIT DEMEDIAM PARTEM DONAVIT NODENTI INTER QVIBVS NOMEN SENICIANI NOLLIS PETMITTAS SANITATEM DONEC PERFERAT VSQVE TEMPLVM NODENTIS

Translation:

To the god Nodens. Silvianus has lost a ring; he hereby gives half of it (i.e. half of its value) to Nodens. Among those who are called Senicianius, do not allow health until he brings it to the temple of Nodens

An addition at the top of the tablet appears to be a very lightly scratched word REDIVIV..., perhaps REDIVIVA - Latin for "renewed". This suggests that the curse had been refreshed, perhaps after someone had interfered with it.

In 1882, the Rev. John James published an article crediting the Rev. James Gerald Joyce with noticing the significance of the ring while visiting The Vyne and seeing the connection between the ring and the curse tablet. The article included woodcut illustrations of both the ring and the tablet. In 1888, the owner of The Vyne, Chaloner W. Chute, published a history of the house in which he wrote about the gold ring and the lead plaque, including the same woodcut illustrations of both. Chute discussed their apparent connection and speculated about the dealings of Senicianus and Silvianus concerning the ring.

== Association with Tolkien ==
In 1929, the archaeologist Sir Mortimer Wheeler was excavating at the Lydney site and made a connection between the ring bearing the name of Senicianus, and the curse tablet bearing the same name. Wheeler called upon J.R.R. Tolkien, as Professor of Anglo-Saxon at Oxford University, to investigate the etymology of the name "Nodens" referred to in the curse.

It is hypothesised that Wheeler, in his discussion with Tolkien on the name Nodens on the curse tablet, would also have discussed the ring at The Vyne, with which he was familiar, though there is no proof of this. It is thought that other aspects of the archaeology of the Lydney area, including an Iron Age Roman fort, may have influenced Tolkien's writings.

The One Ring plays a central part in The Hobbit (published 1937) and The Lord of the Rings (1954). In Tolkien's legendarium, the One Ring was forged by the Dark Lord Sauron in order to enslave the inhabitants of Middle-earth.

The Tolkien Society helped set up a "Ring Room" at the Vyne, which included the Ring of Silvianus in a rotating display case, a first edition of The Hobbit and a copy of the curse. There was also a Middle-earth adventure playground in the grounds. Lynn Forest-Hill of the Tolkien Society expressed pleasure at the discovery of a material source for the One Ring described in Tolkien's novels, stating that all sources previously cited have been literary or legendary, such as the Ring of the Nibelungs.
